= Contour (towers) =

Residential development under construction in Manchester, England

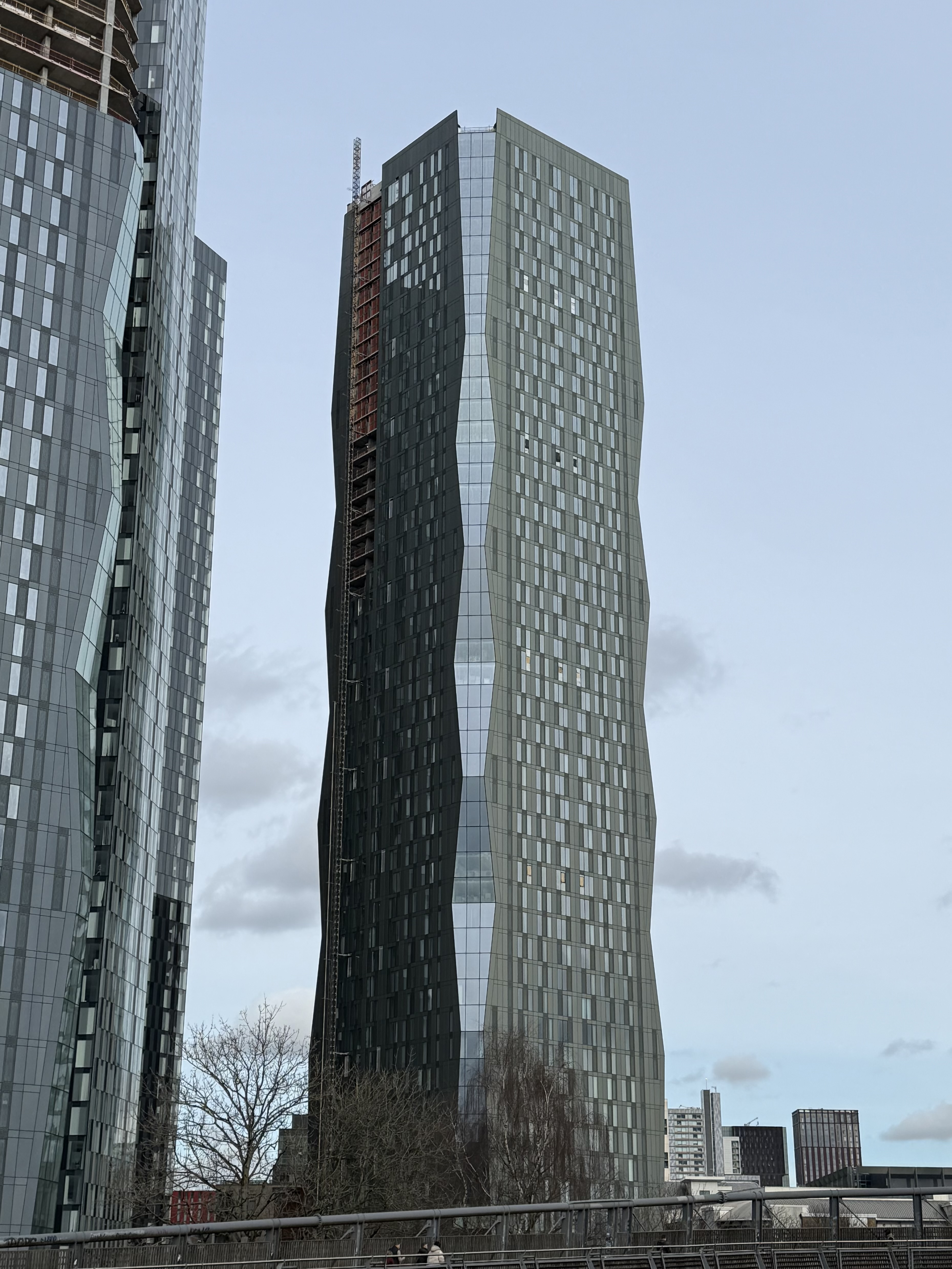
- Contour East Tower (Tower 1) in February 2026

- Location within Greater Manchester
- Former names: Great Jackson Street Plot F

General information
- Status: Tower 1: topped out Tower 2: topped out
- Type: Residential skyscrapers
- Location: Great Jackson Street, Manchester, England
- Coordinates: 53.472°N 2.25°W
- Construction started: 2024
- Estimated completion: Tower 1: 2026; Tower 2: 2026
- Owner: Renaker

Height
- Height: Tower 1: 154 m (505 ft); Tower 2: 154 m (505 ft)

Technical details
- Floor count: Tower 1: 51; Tower 2: 51

Design and construction
- Architect: SimpsonHaugh

Website
- contournewjackson.com

Contour is a residential development under construction in the Castlefield area of Manchester, England. Once completed, it will comprise two 154-metre (505 ft), 51-storey skyscrapers designed by SimpsonHaugh architects as part of the Great Jackson Street masterplan, adjacent to the Deansgate Square skyscraper cluster.

The towers incorporate a faceted design with chamfered edges, giving them a multi‑planar profile. Developed by Renaker, the project remains under construction, with the East Tower (Tower 1) structurally topped out in February 2026 and the West Tower topping out in June 2026. External cladding installation is ongoing. When completed, they will be the joint seventh-tallest buildings in Greater Manchester.

== History ==
=== Planning ===
The planning application was submitted by the developer Renaker to Manchester City Council in November 2021 for two 51-storey residential buildings across two phases. The towers will contain a combined total of 988 apartments and each building will have co-working space, a gym and lounges. Planning approval for the towers was obtained in March 2022.

=== Construction ===
Construction work began in March 2024. The east and west towers topped out in February and June 2026, respectively, with completion expected later the same year.

The site of the two towers will also include 0.5 acres (0.20 ha) of public realm.

== Design and architecture ==
The towers were designed by SimpsonHaugh as part of the wider Great Jackson Street masterplan. Contour consists of two identical 51‑storey towers positioned on a shared podium. Each tower has a faceted massing with chamfered edges. The façades combine glazing with blue and green anodised aluminium cladding. In height, materials, and overall composition, the towers are consistent with adjacent developments such as Deansgate Square, Three60, and The Blade.

== Gallery ==
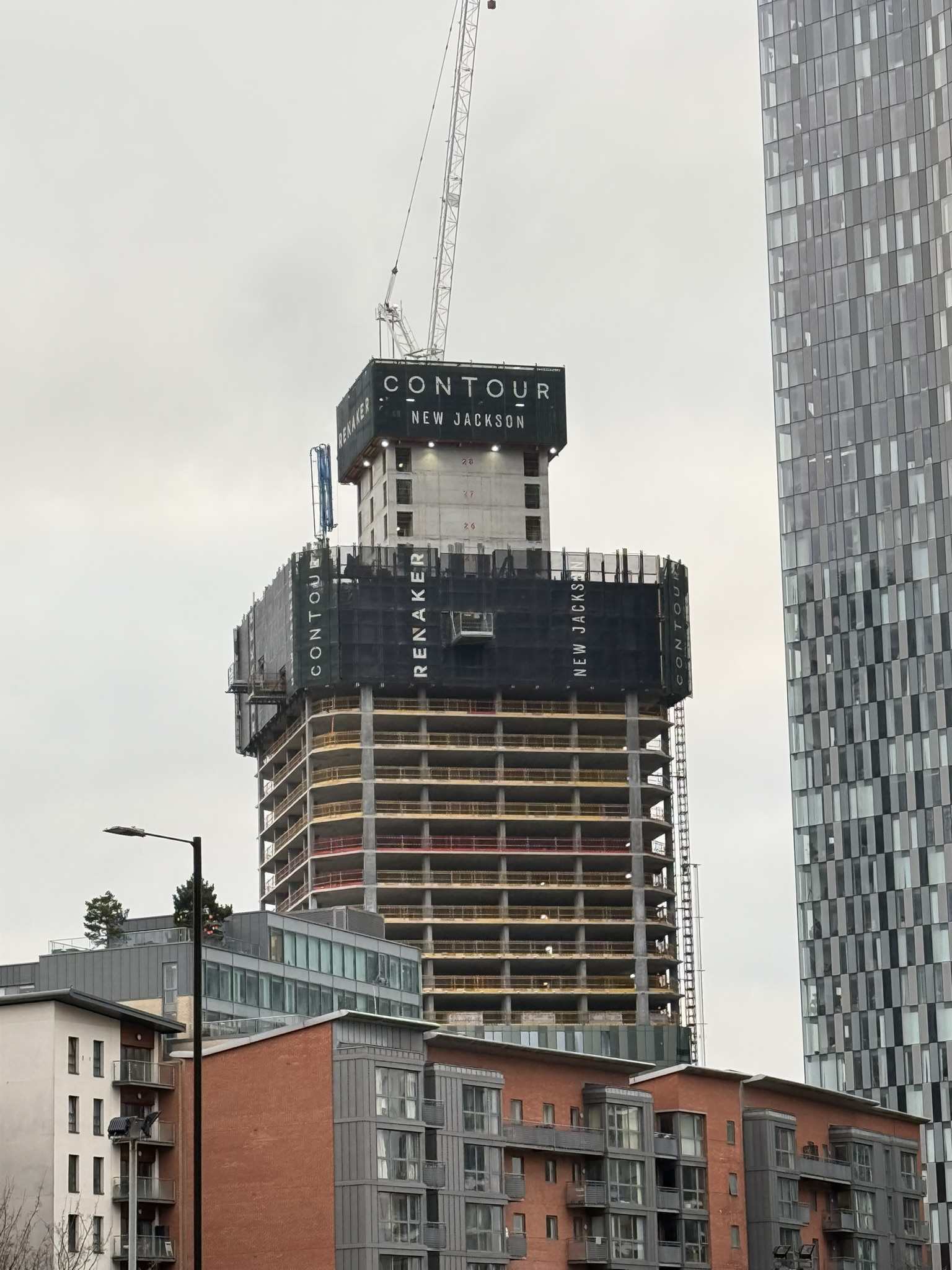
Tower 1 under construction in February 2025

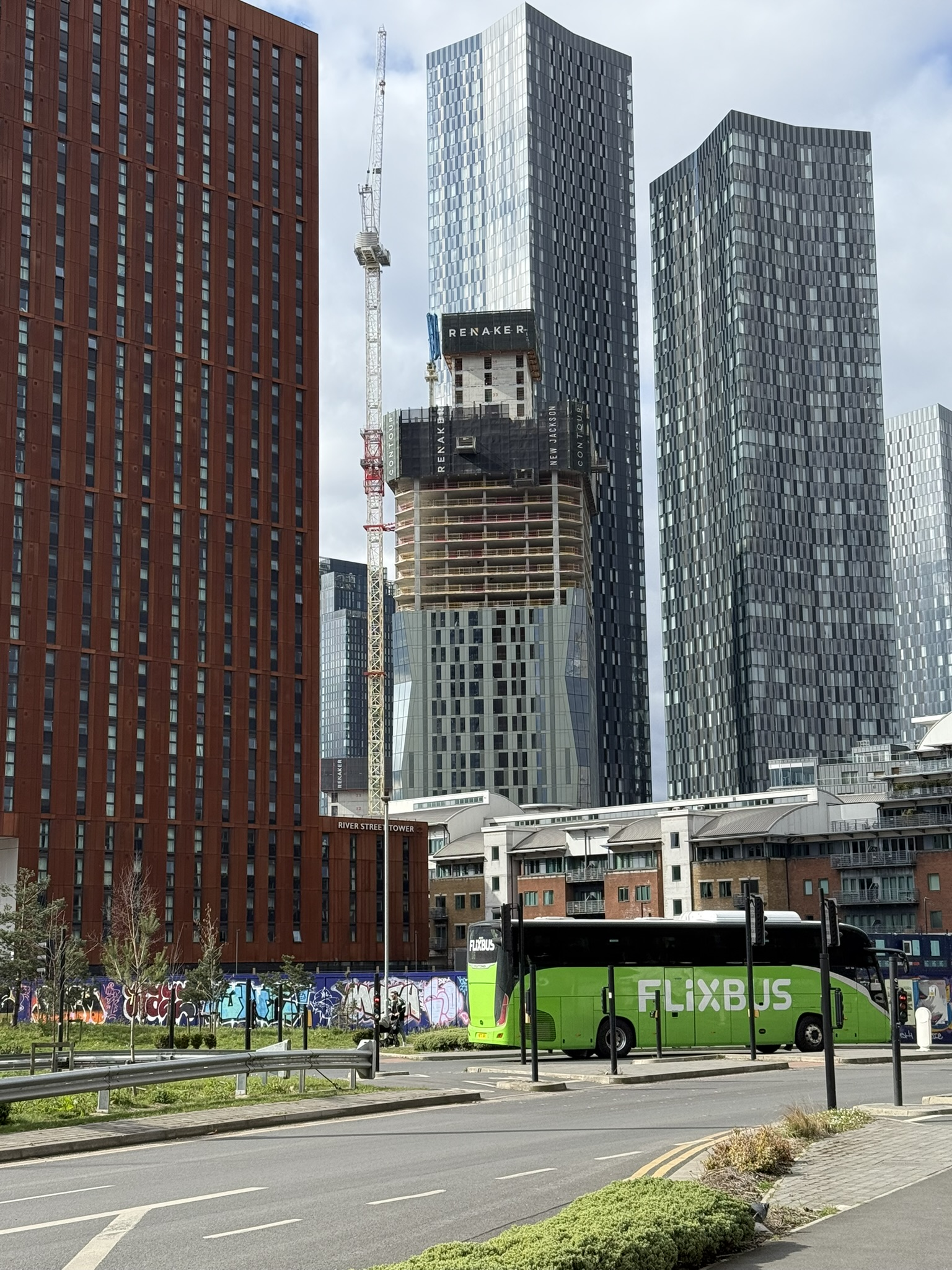
Tower 1 under construction in March 2025

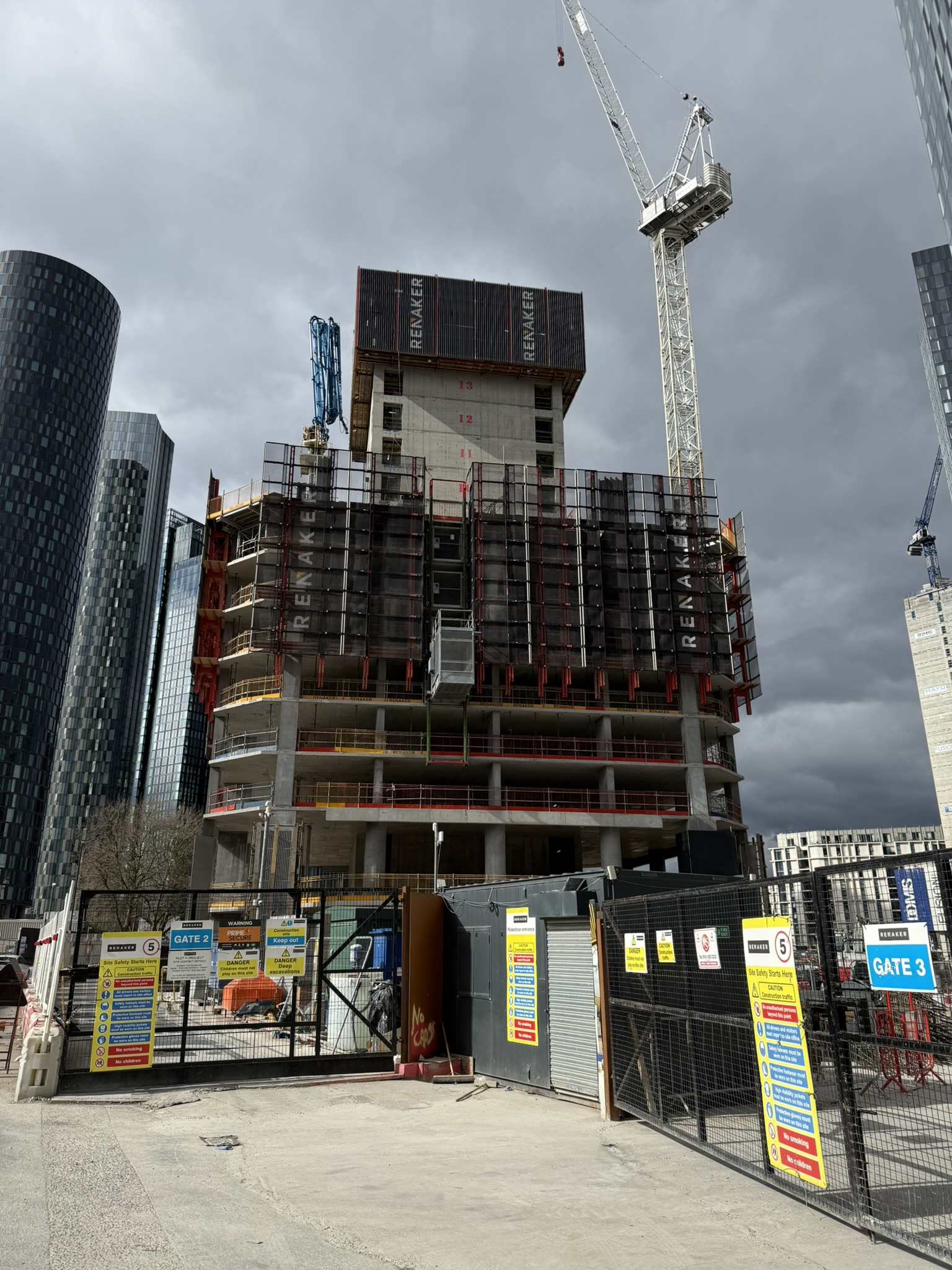
Tower 2 under construction in March 2025

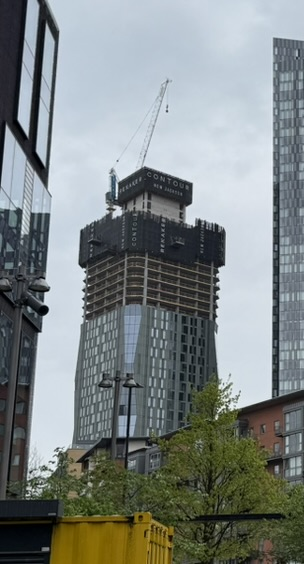
Tower 1 under construction in April 2025

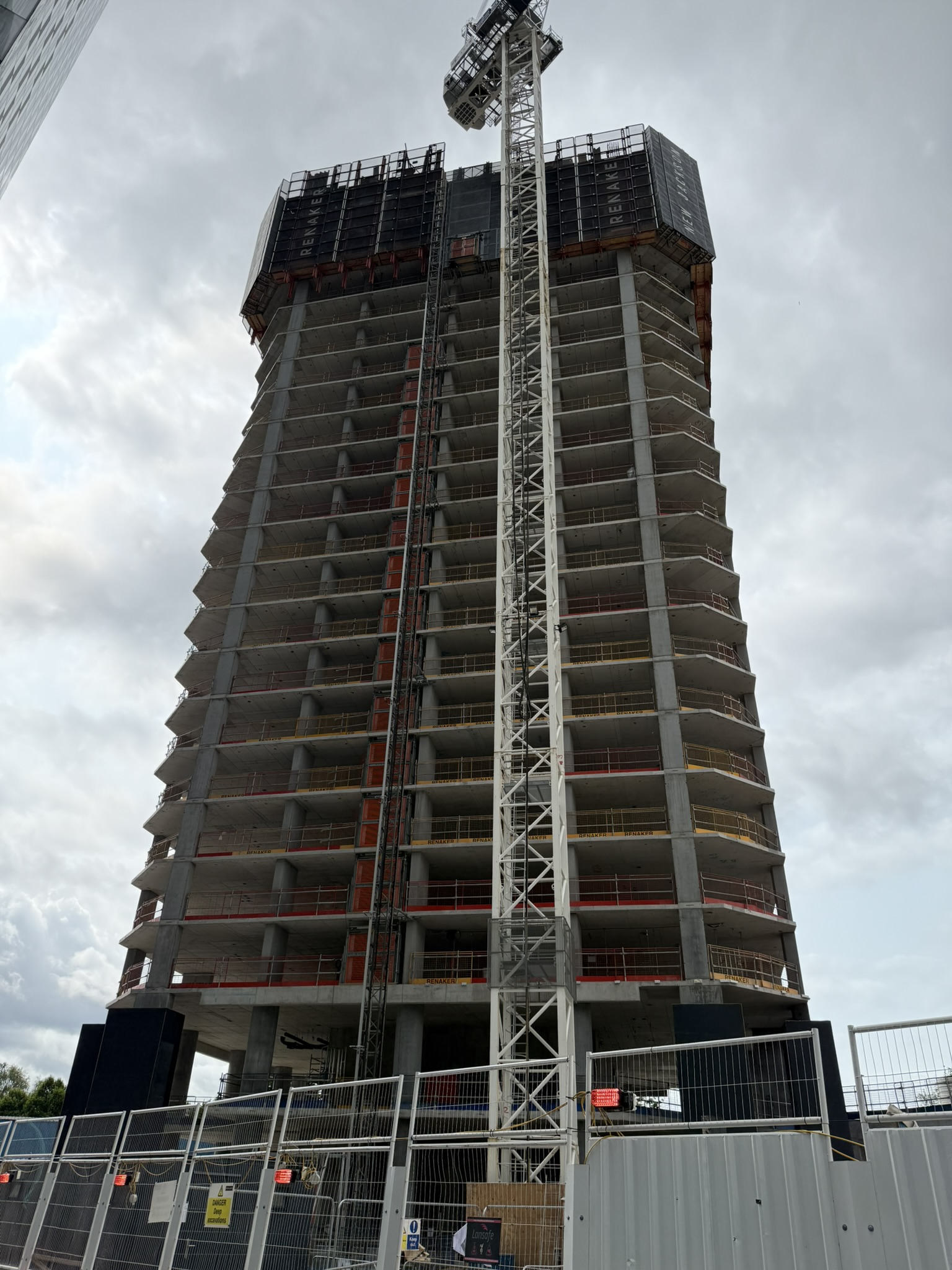
Tower 2 under construction in May 2025

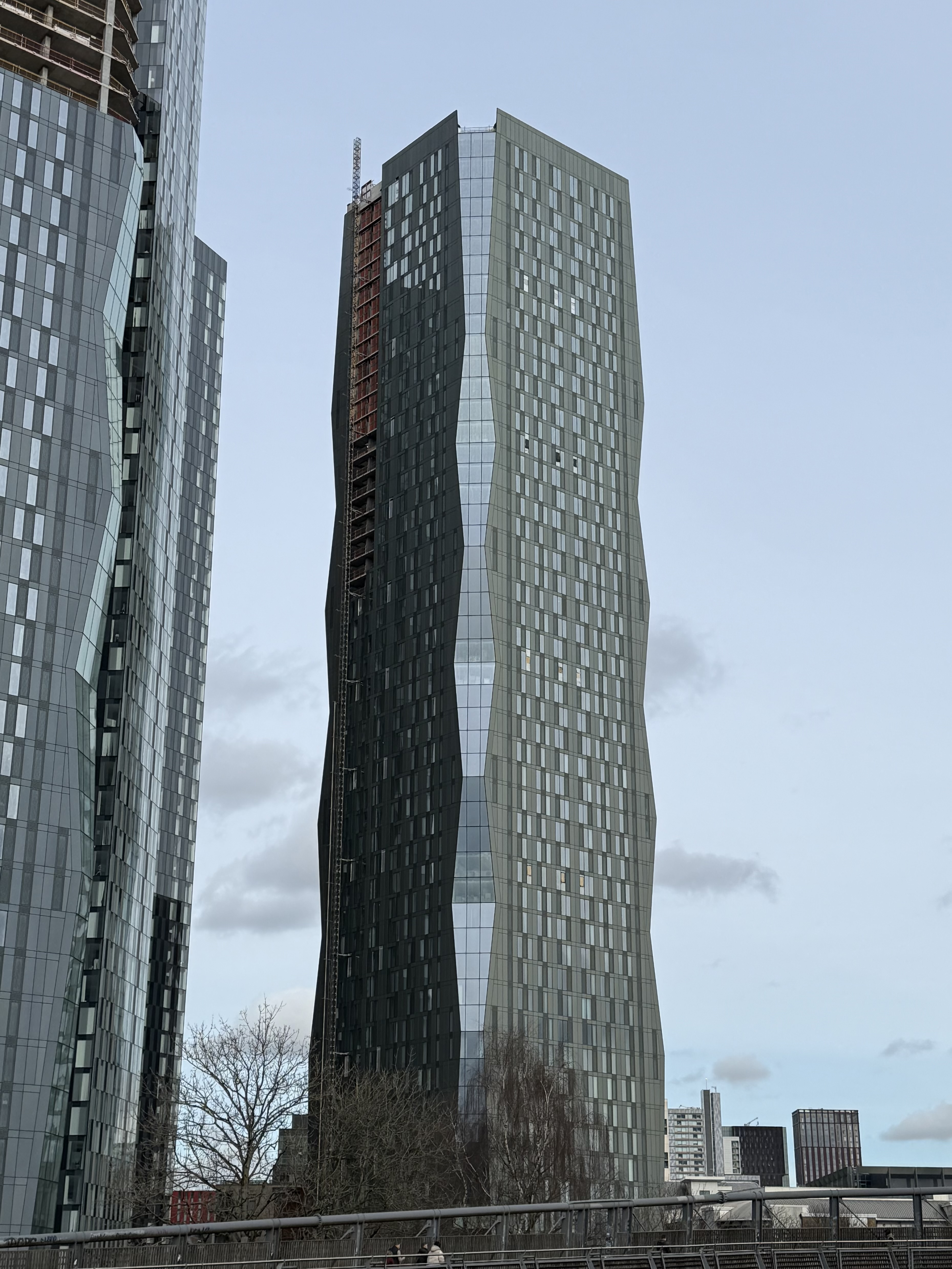
Tower 1 topped out in February 2026

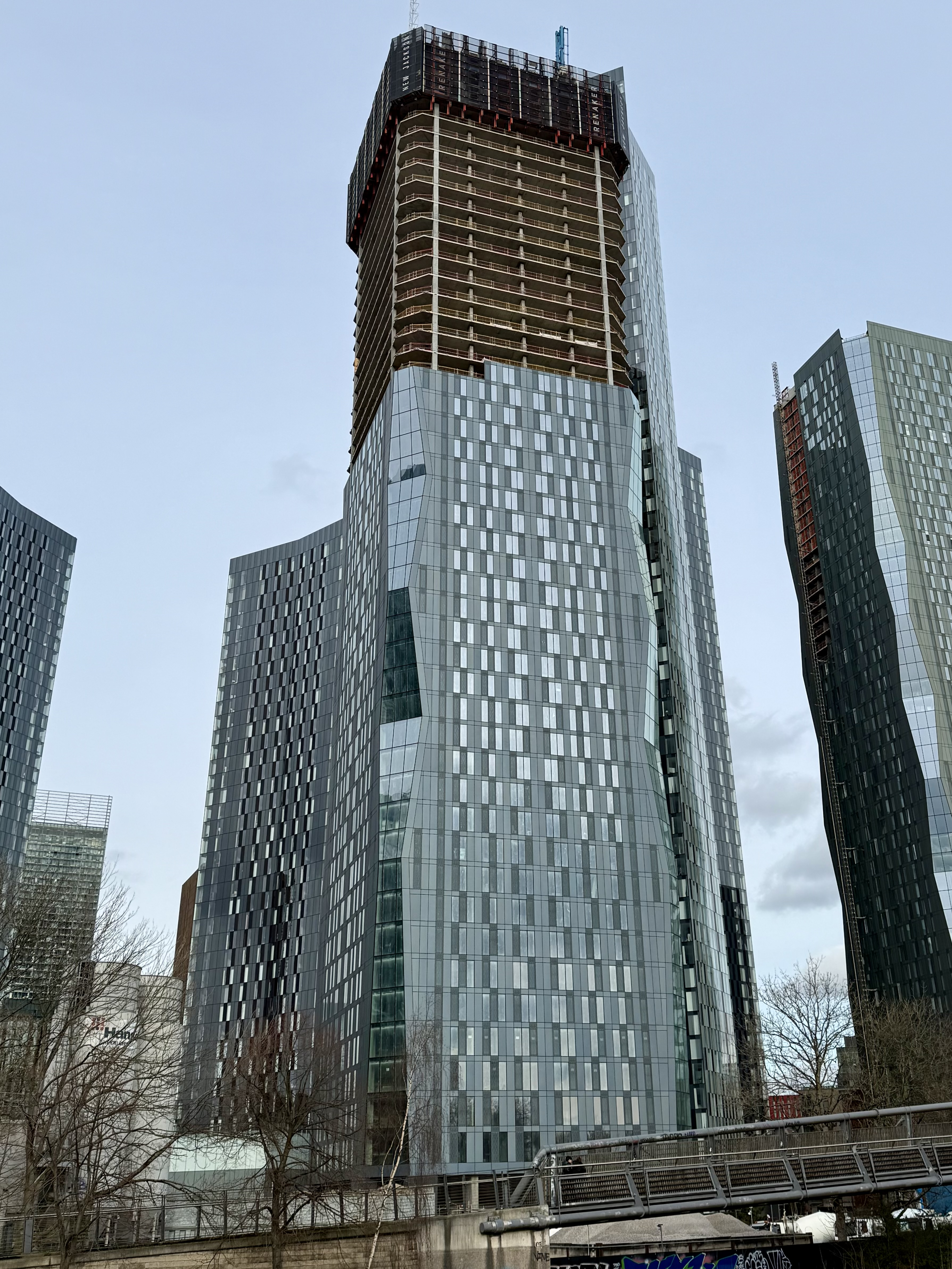
Tower 2 under construction in February 2026

== See also ==
- List of tallest buildings and structures in Greater Manchester
- List of tallest buildings in the United Kingdom
