= 100 Greengate =

Residential high-rise in Salford, England

Coordinates: 53.4880°N 2.2494°W

Anaconda Cut
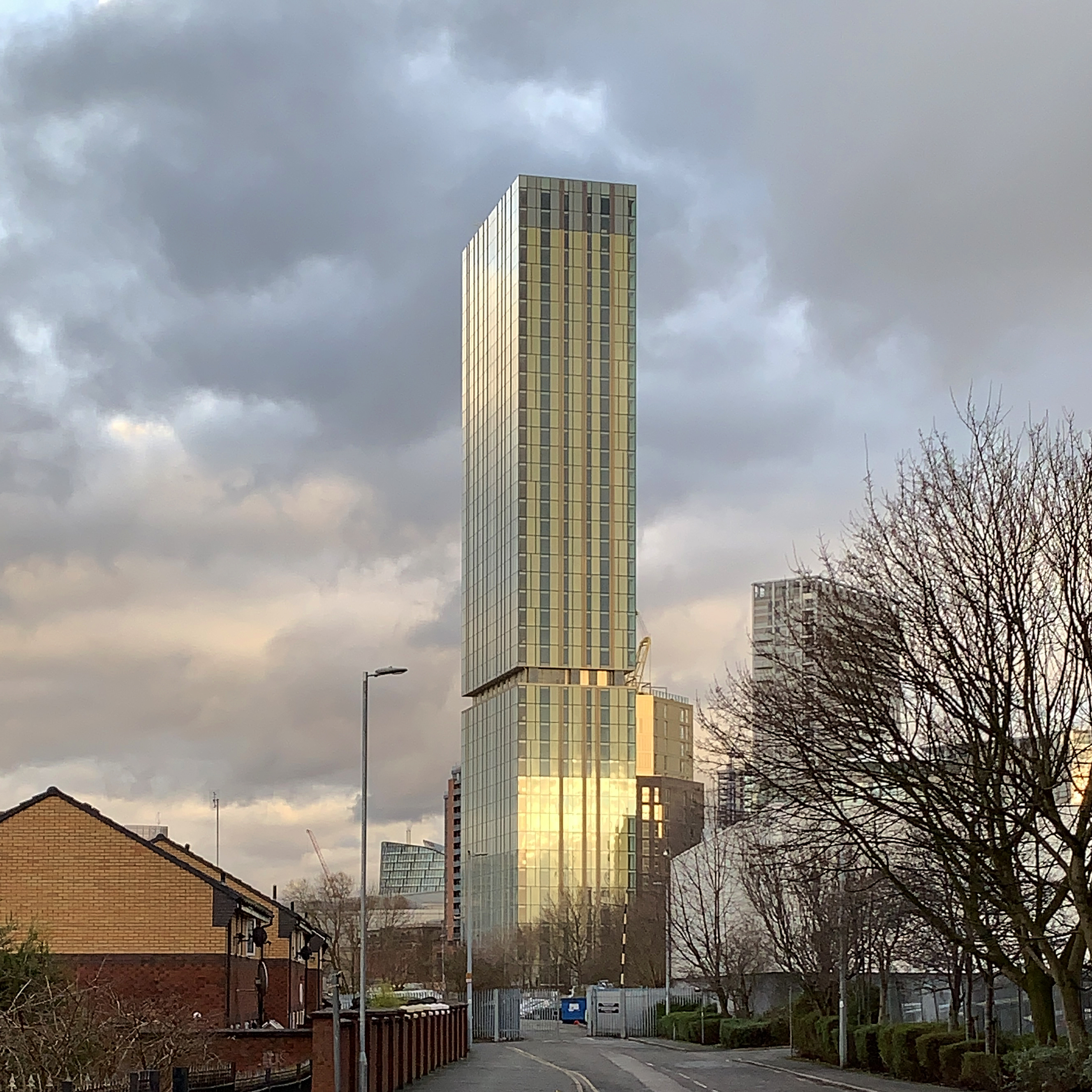
- Anaconda Cut in 2019

- Location within Greater Manchester

General information
- Type: Residential high-rise
- Location: Greengate, Salford, England
- Construction started: 2016
- Completed: 2018; 8 years ago

Height
- Roof: 131 m (430 ft)

Technical details
- Floor count: 44

Design and construction
- Architect: OMI Architects
- Developer: Renaker

Website
- www.anaconda-cut.com

100 Greengate (known as Anaconda Cut and during development known as Exchange Court) is a 350 apartment residential high-rise building in the Greengate area of Salford, England, with a height of 131 metres (430 ft). As of June 2026, it is the second-tallest building in Salford after the 153-metre (502 ft) Cortland at Colliers Yard and the 15th-tallest in Greater Manchester.

It was designed by OMI Architects, developed by Renaker and is part of a major redevelopment of the Greengate area. The 44-storey tower includes a lower elevation clad with aluminium panels reaching 16 storeys. The main tower is covered with reflective metal panels set behind the glass.

The site is bounded by Trinity Way to the north, and Greengate to the south.

== History ==
Construction of the building started in May 2016 and it was topped out in March 2018.

The building is named after a specific section of the River Irwell and a 1960s engineering project that straightened a snake-like bend in the river to prevent flooding in Salford. The name also serves as a tribute to the Anaconda Copper Works, which formerly occupied the site.

== Gallery ==
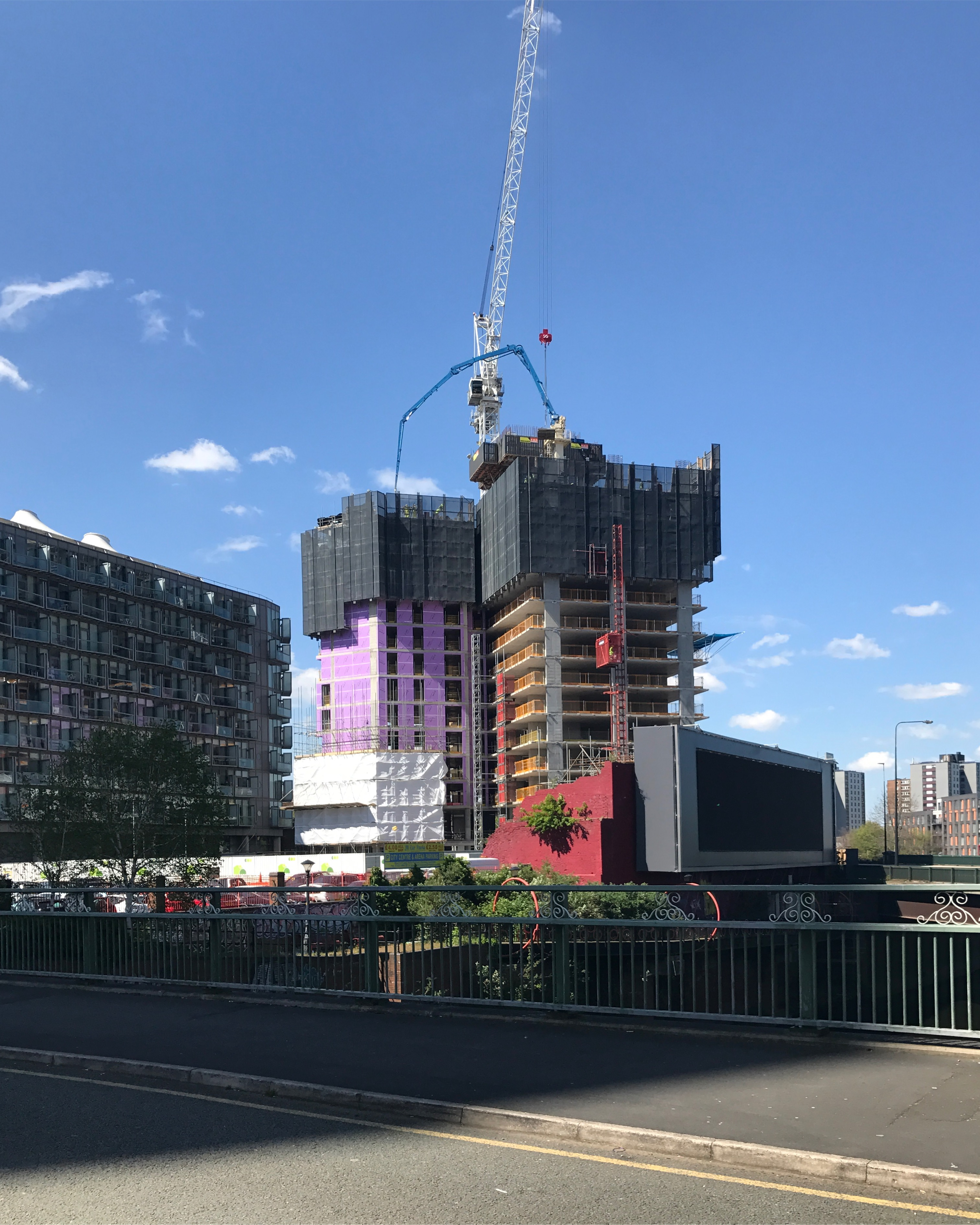
3 May 2017

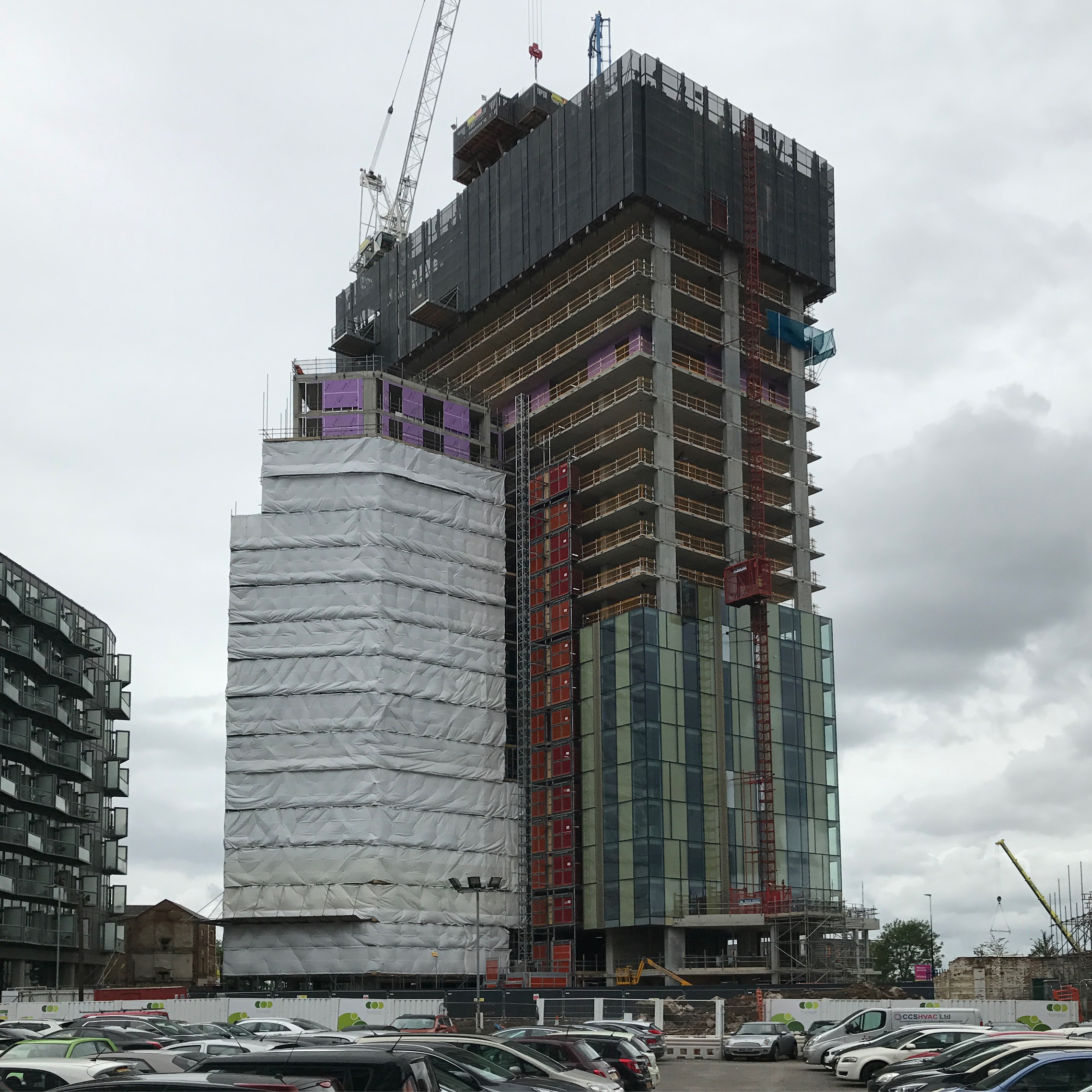
20 July 2017

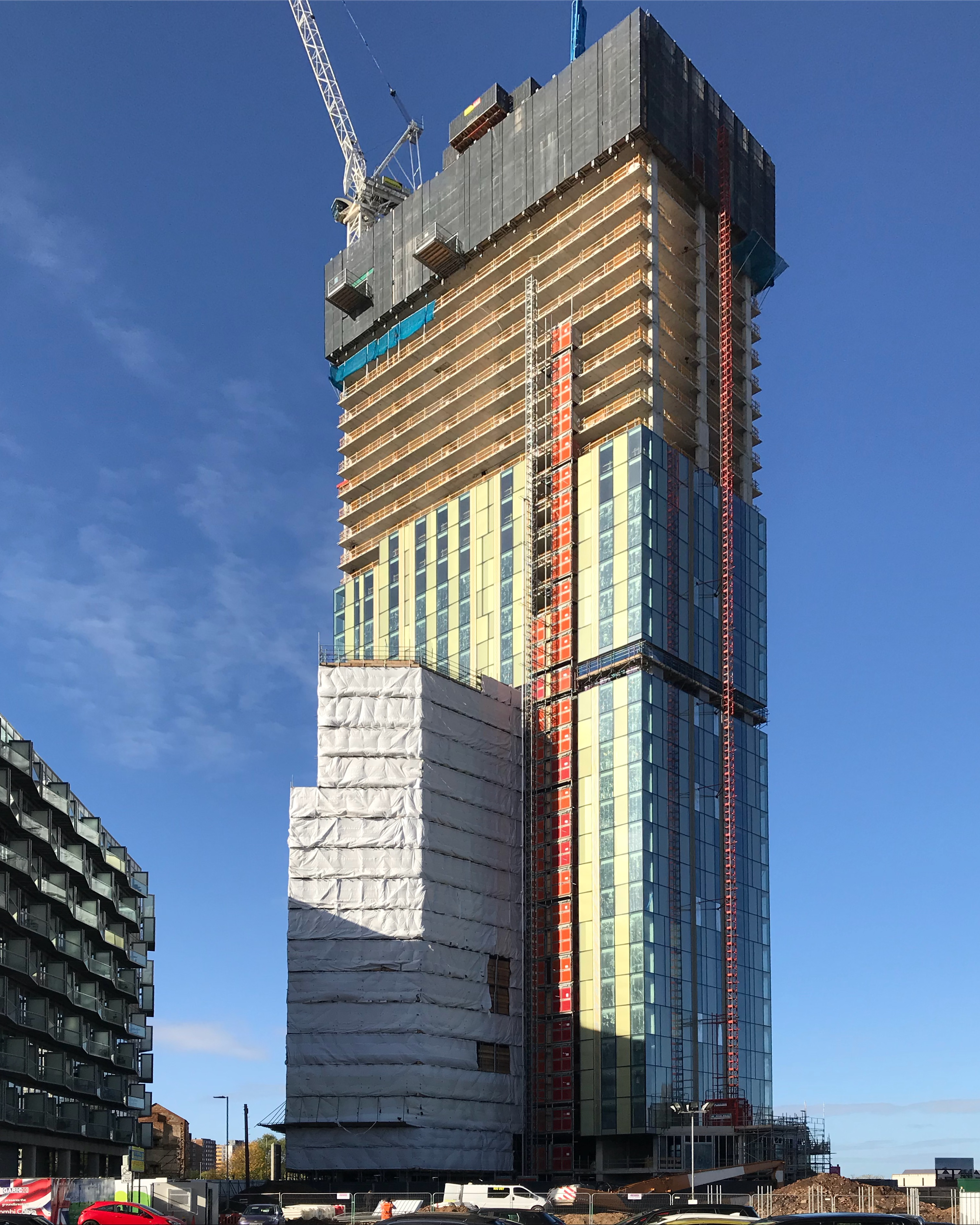
31 July 2017

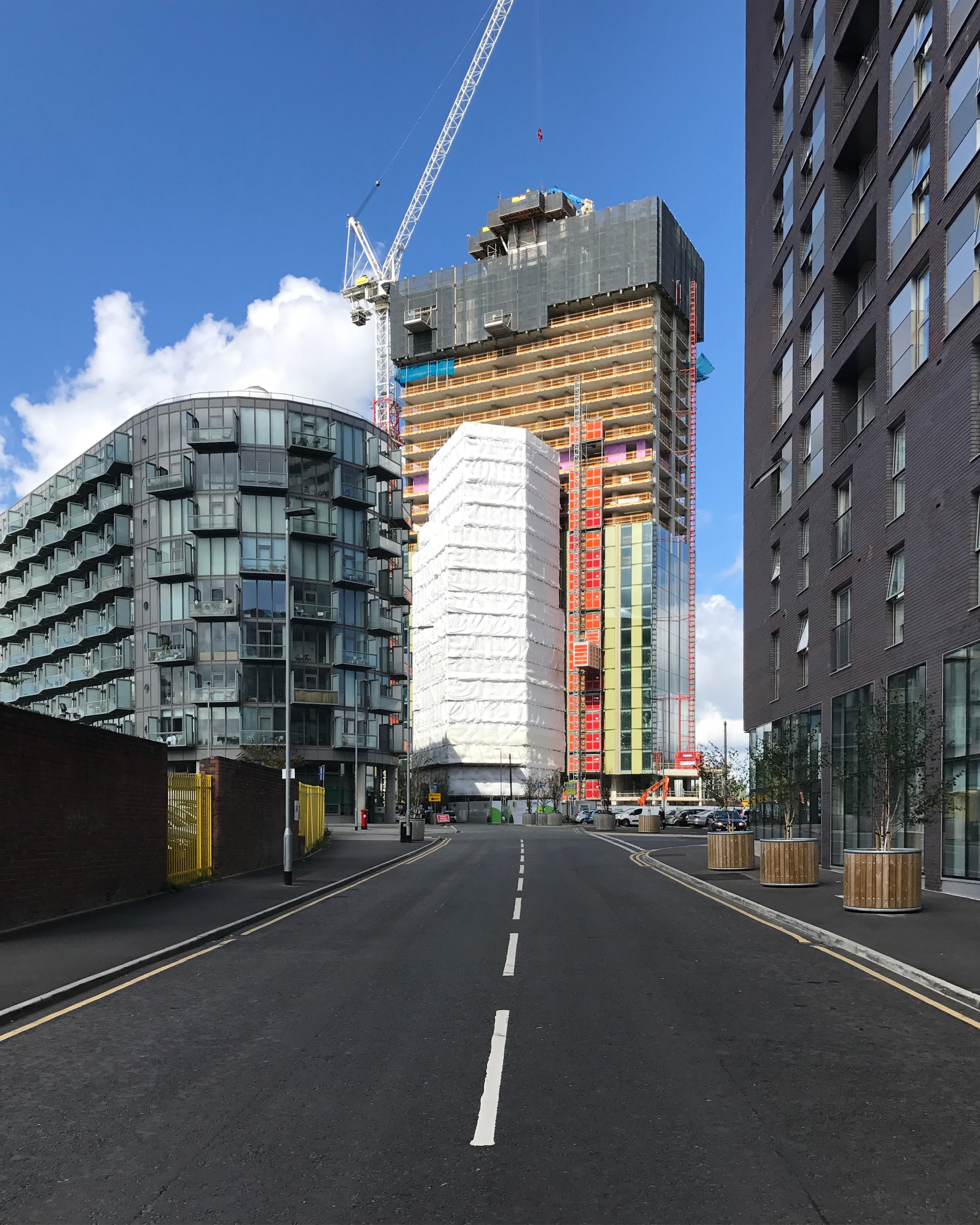
15 August 2017

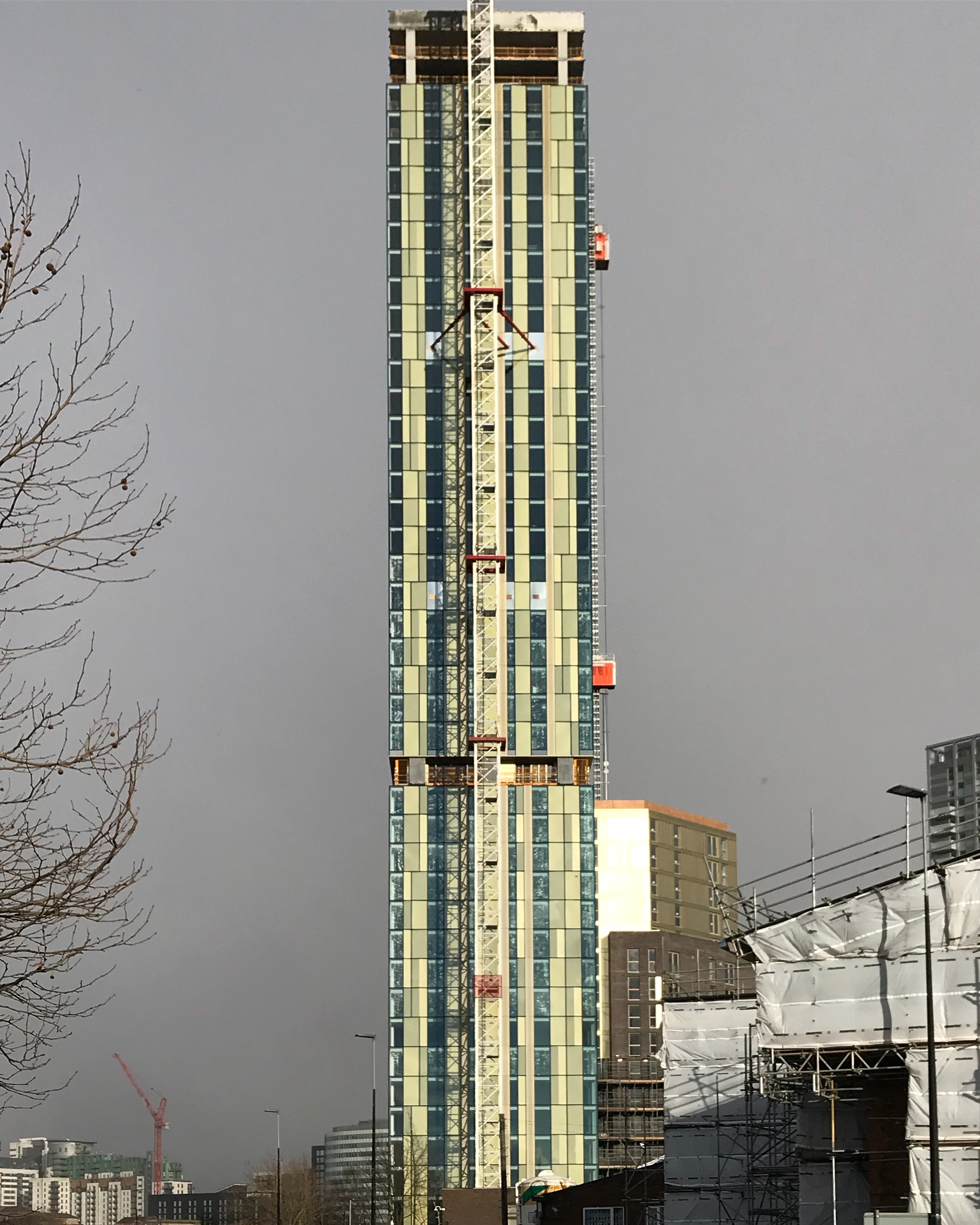
26 February 2018

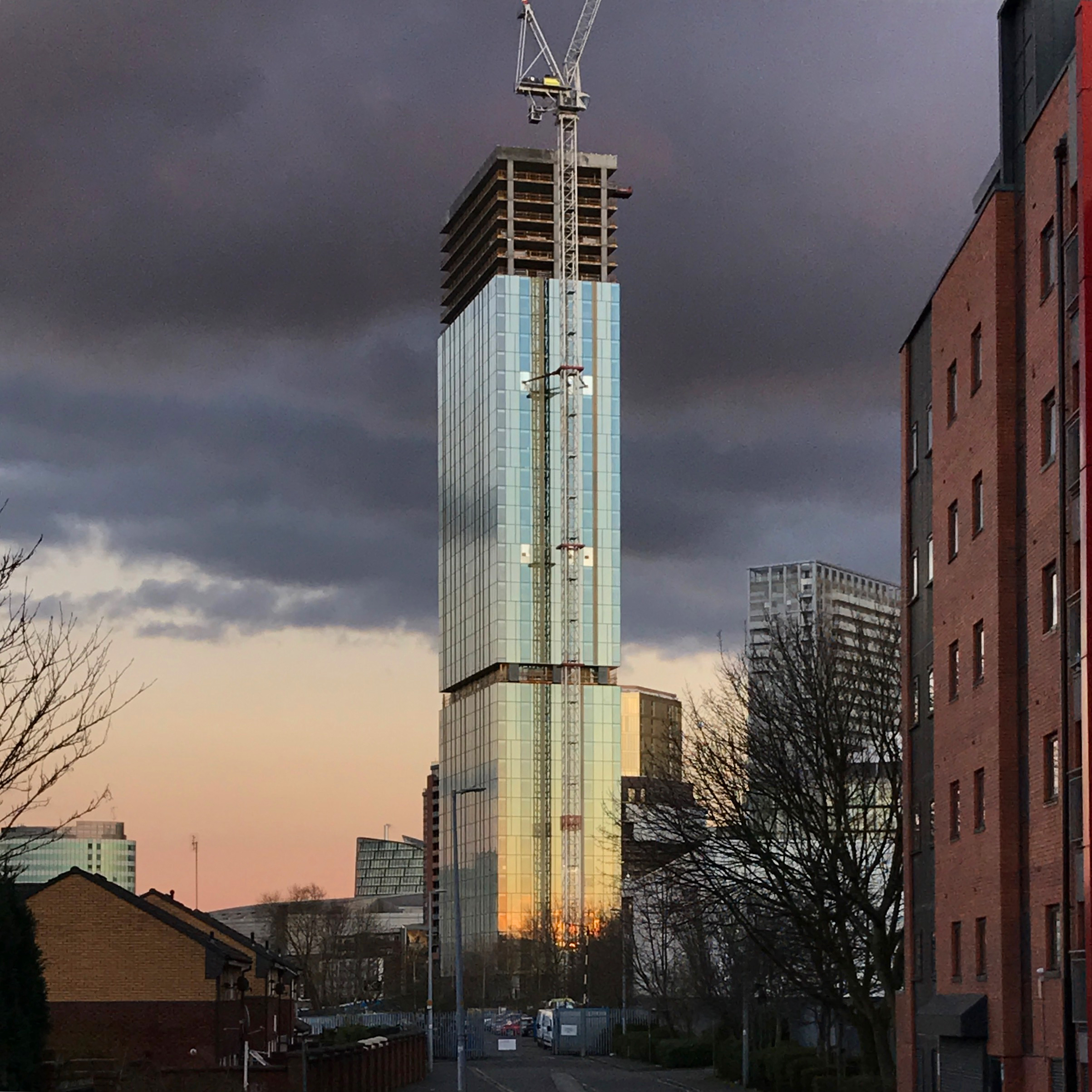
16 March 2018

== See also ==
- List of tallest buildings and structures in Greater Manchester
- List of tallest buildings in the United Kingdom
