= Bankside at Colliers Yard =

Residential high-rise in Salford, England

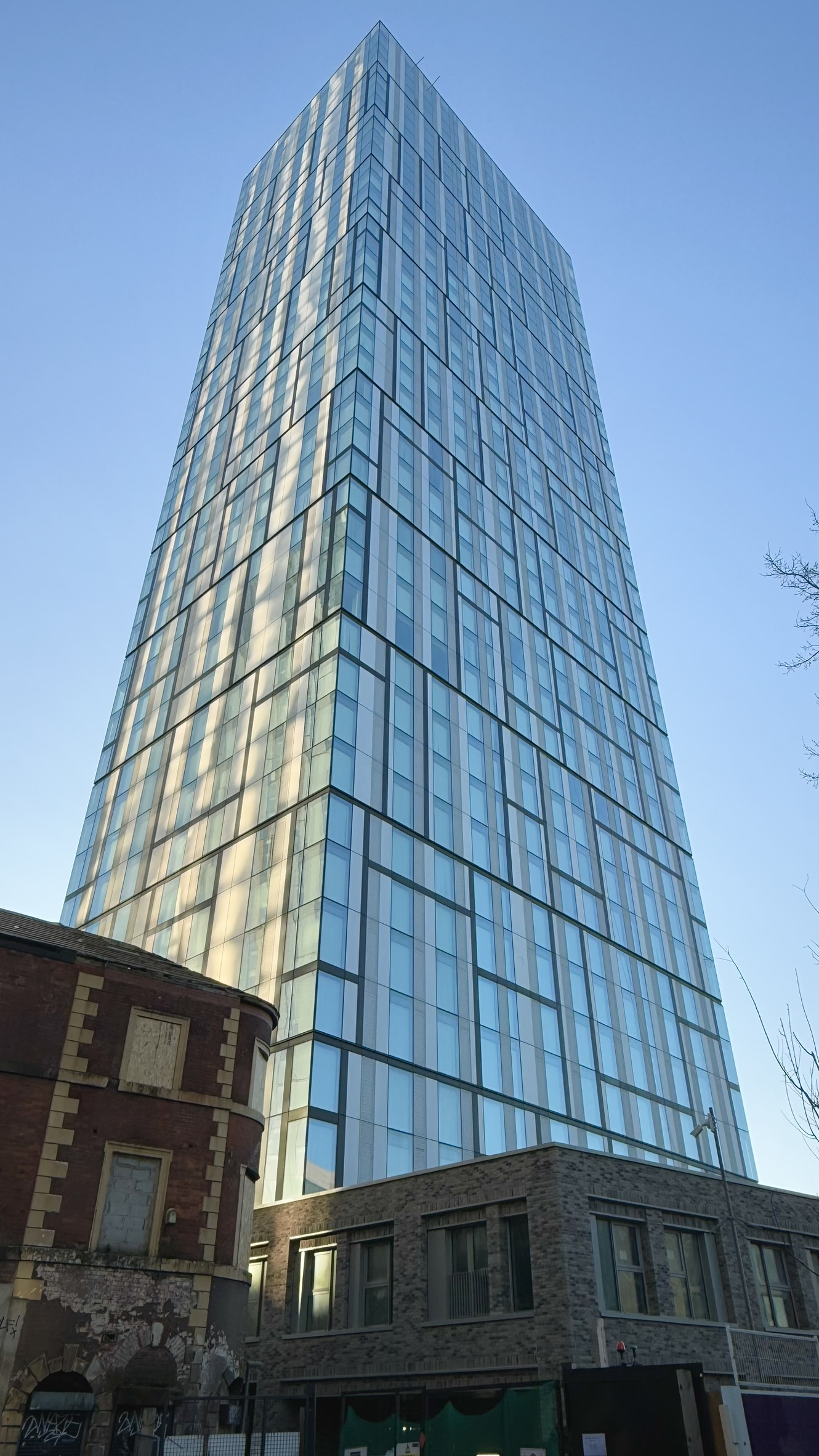
- The building in 2025

- Location within Greater Manchester
- Former names: Plot C

General information
- Type: Residential high-rise
- Location: Bankside Boulevard, Greengate, Salford, England
- Coordinates: 53.4876°N 2.2505°W
- Construction started: 2022; 4 years ago
- Completed: 2025; 1 year ago
- Owner: Renaker

Height
- Height: 129 m (423 ft)

Technical details
- Floor count: 43

Design and construction
- Architect: Denton Corker Marshall

Other information
- Number of units: 444

Website
- Official website

Bankside at Colliers Yard is a residential high-rise building on Bankside Boulevard in the Greengate area of Salford, England. At 129 metres (423 ft) and 43 storeys, it is the third-tallest building in Salford and the 16th-tallest in Greater Manchester as of June 2026. It was designed by Denton Corker Marshall, and constructed between 2022 and 2025.

The building is part of developer Renaker's Greengate masterplan called Colliers Yard, which consists of three adjacent towers, the others being Cortland which was completed in 2023, and Parkside which was granted planning permission in March 2023.

== History ==
=== Planning ===
A hybrid planning application, which included the tower ultimately named Bankside at Colliers Yard, was submitted to Salford City Council in 2019, with reserved matters consent obtained in March 2022.

=== Construction ===
Construction of Bankside at Colliers Yard commenced in March 2022 and completed in 2025. The tower contains 444 apartments.

== See also ==
- List of tallest buildings and structures in Greater Manchester
- List of tallest buildings in the United Kingdom
