= Renaker =

Property development company in Manchester, England

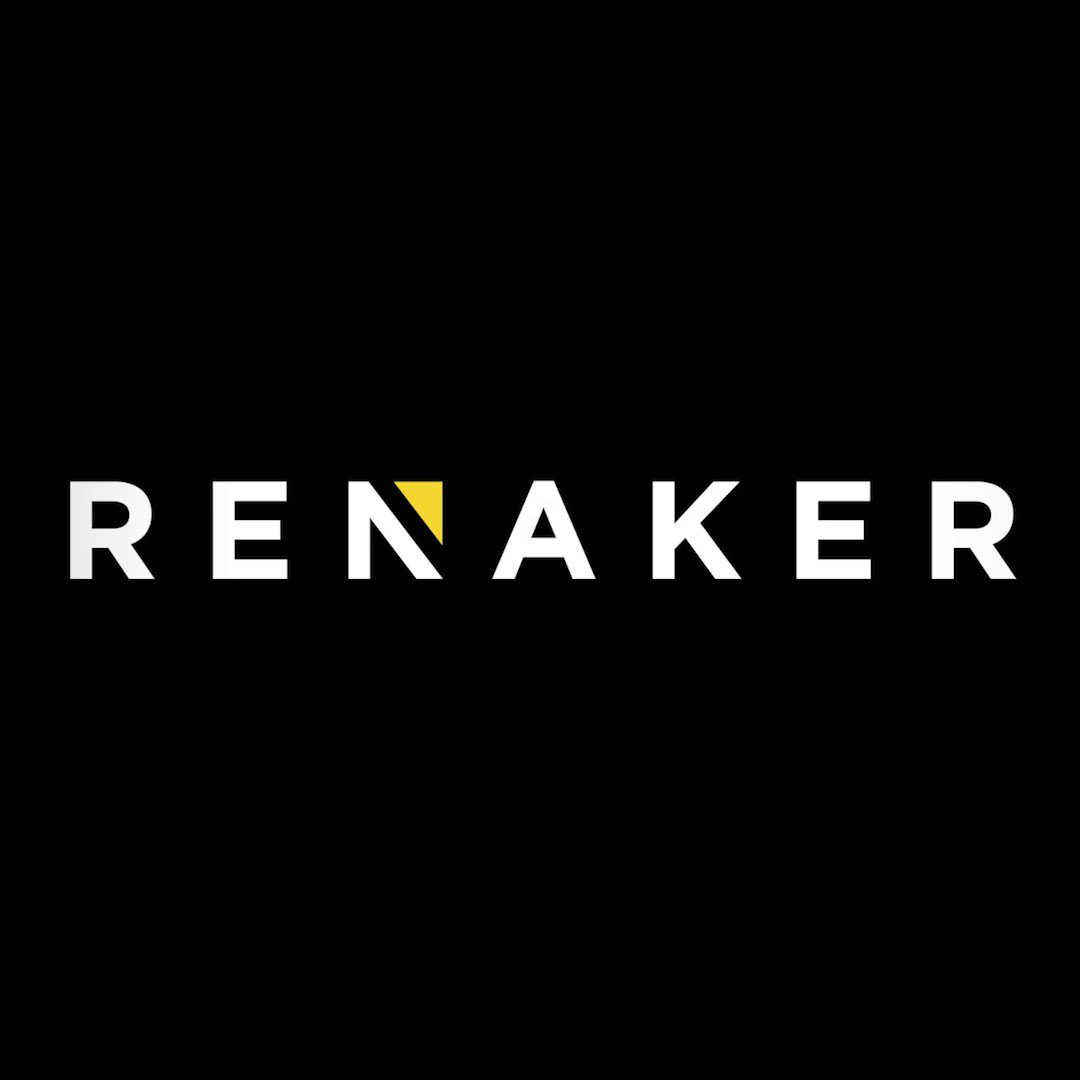
- Company type: Private
- Industry: Property development and construction
- Founded: 2006
- Founder: Daren Whitaker
- Headquarters: Bengal Street, Ancoats; Manchester
- Area served: United Kingdom
- Revenue: ▲£229 million (2023)
- Website: renaker.com

Renaker is a property developer based in the Ancoats area of Manchester, England. Founded by Daren Whitaker in 2006, the company has built 8,500 homes across Manchester and neighbouring Salford as of September 2025. Its central development is New Jackson, located in the south of Manchester—a designated skyscraper district of which Deansgate Square is a constituent part.

== Major projects ==
Renaker is working on three main clusters - New Jackson in Castlefield, Greengate in Salford, and Trinity Islands to the west of Manchester city centre.

Name	Image	Height	Architect	Year completed	Area	Residential units	Notes
Deansgate Square		201 m (659 ft) (tallest)	SimpsonHaugh	2019	Castlefield	1,508	The South tower is the current tallest building in Greater Manchester
Three60		154 m (506 ft)	SimpsonHaugh	2023	Castlefield	441	
The Blade		153 m (503 ft)	SimpsonHaugh	2023	Castlefield	414	
Elizabeth Tower		153 m (501 ft)	SimpsonHaugh	2022	Castlefield	484	
Colliers Yard		153 m (500 ft) (tallest)	Denton Corker Marshall	2023	Greengate	559	Tallest building in Salford
Anaconda Cut		131 m (430 ft)	OMI Architects	2018	Greengate	351	
Bankside at Colliers Yard		129m (423ft)	Denton Corker Marshall	2025	Greengate	444	
One Port Street		100m (330 ft)	SimpsonHaugh	2026	Northern Quarter	477	Renaker only served as contractor; scheme developed by Select Property Group

== In development ==
=== New Jackson ===
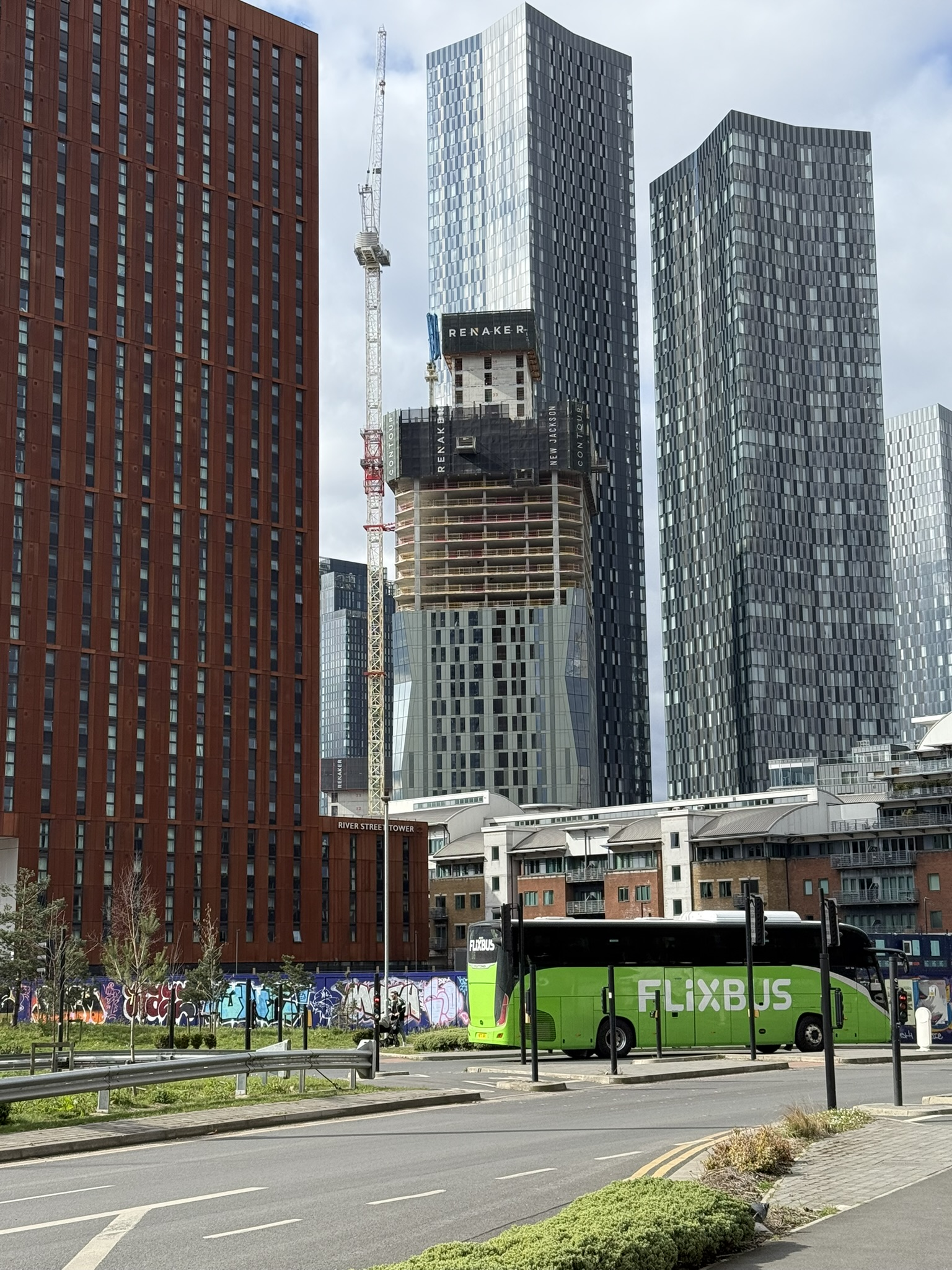
The eastern Contour tower in March 2025

Two towers with matching designs are currently under construction at New Jackson - Contour - one tower will be clad in green, the other in blue. Designed by SimpsonHaugh, the towers will have sculpted edges and both rise to a height of 154 metres (505 ft). The eastern tower topped out in September 2025.

A set of four towers; with two also at 154 metres and two at 141 metres (463 ft) - known as The Green - have been approved. In addition, a landmark tower known as The Lighthouse has been approved for the southern most site in the New Jackson site, which would rise to a height of 213 metres (699 ft) and 70 storeys, becoming the tallest building in Greater Manchester if built. Combined, the Green and the Lighthouse would deliver 2,388 homes delivered on a 1.2-acre (0.49 ha) site.

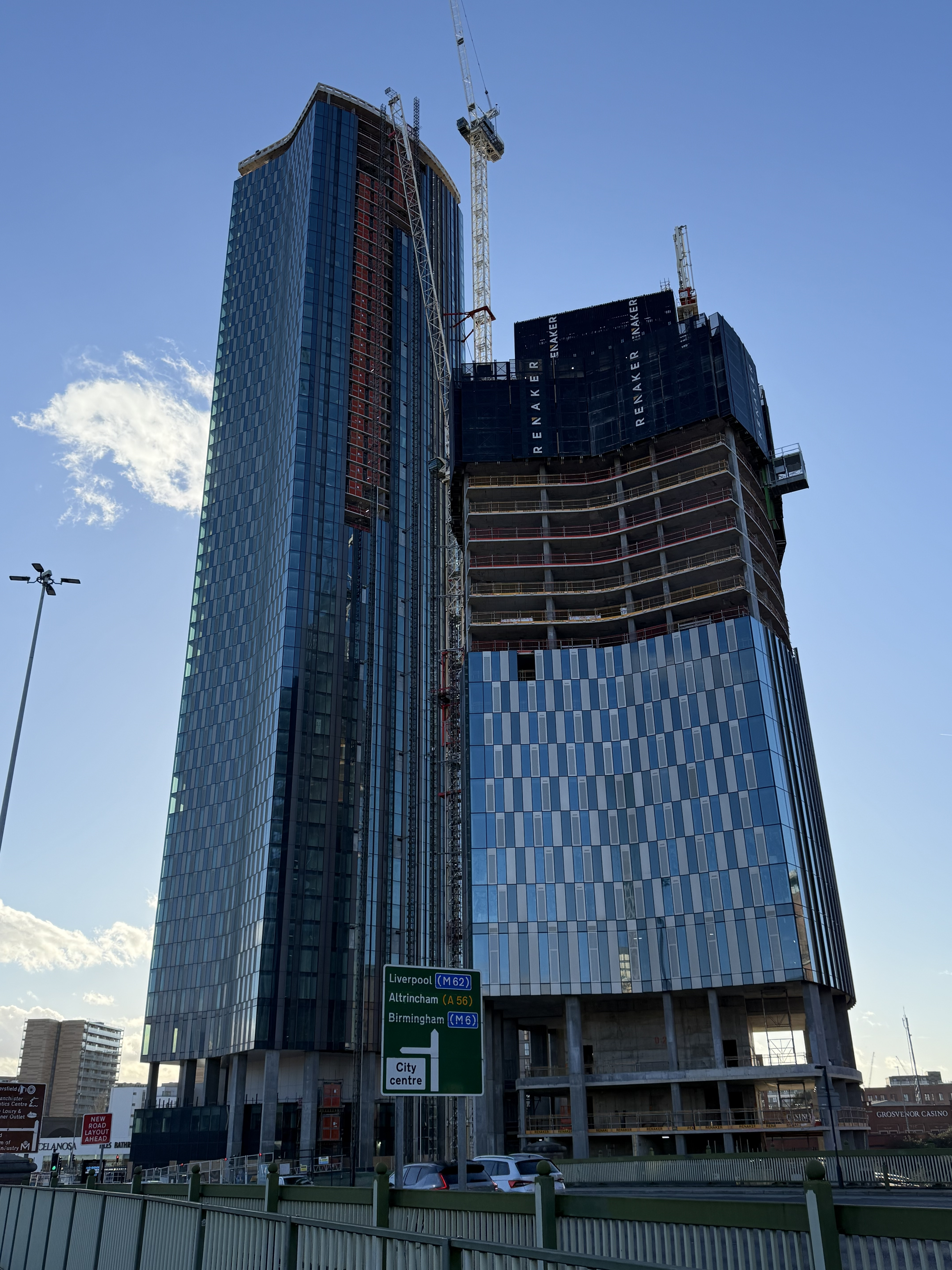
Progress on the tallest Trinity Islands towers in 2025

=== Trinity Islands ===
Renaker took over two parcels of land which had been earmarked for development for many years, tabling a proposal for four towers; the tallest reaching 183 metres (600 ft). The Trinity Islands buildings were designed by long-term Renaker collaborator, SimpsonHaugh. The four towers will deliver 1,920 apartments. Construction commenced in 2023, with the second-tallest building topping out in July 2025.

=== Greengate ===
A 41-storey apartment building named Parkside was approved by Salford City Council in 2023. It will deliver 518 homes and is being touted as the final tower to be built by Renaker in the Greengate cluster. The scheme is designed by Denton Corker Marshall. Groundworks commenced in late 2025.

The company is also restoring a Victorian bathhouse which is situated within the cluster of towers, as a community asset and potential commercial opportunity. It could also be restored to its original use as a swimming pool facility.

== Controversies ==
=== Affordable housing contributions and GMCA loans ===
Renaker has received a total of £615 million from the Greater Manchester Housing Investment Fund, a fund which is controlled by the Greater Manchester Combined Authority (GMCA), for use in developments across Greater Manchester which accounts for over half of the amount lent to developers across the region. A rival landowner, Aubrey Weis, brought a case against the GMCA alleging the interest rates on loans given to Renaker were too low, distorting the local property development market. Weis further alleged that Renaker used 'different figures' in order to avoid having a fifth of a development as designated affordable housing, which is the policy of Manchester City Council. Renaker has not provided any affordable housing as part of the New Jackson towers, for example. A later ruling from the Competitions Authority found no wrongdoing on the part of GMCA and dismissed the lawsuit brought by Weis.
