= One Port Street =

Residential high-rise in Manchester, England

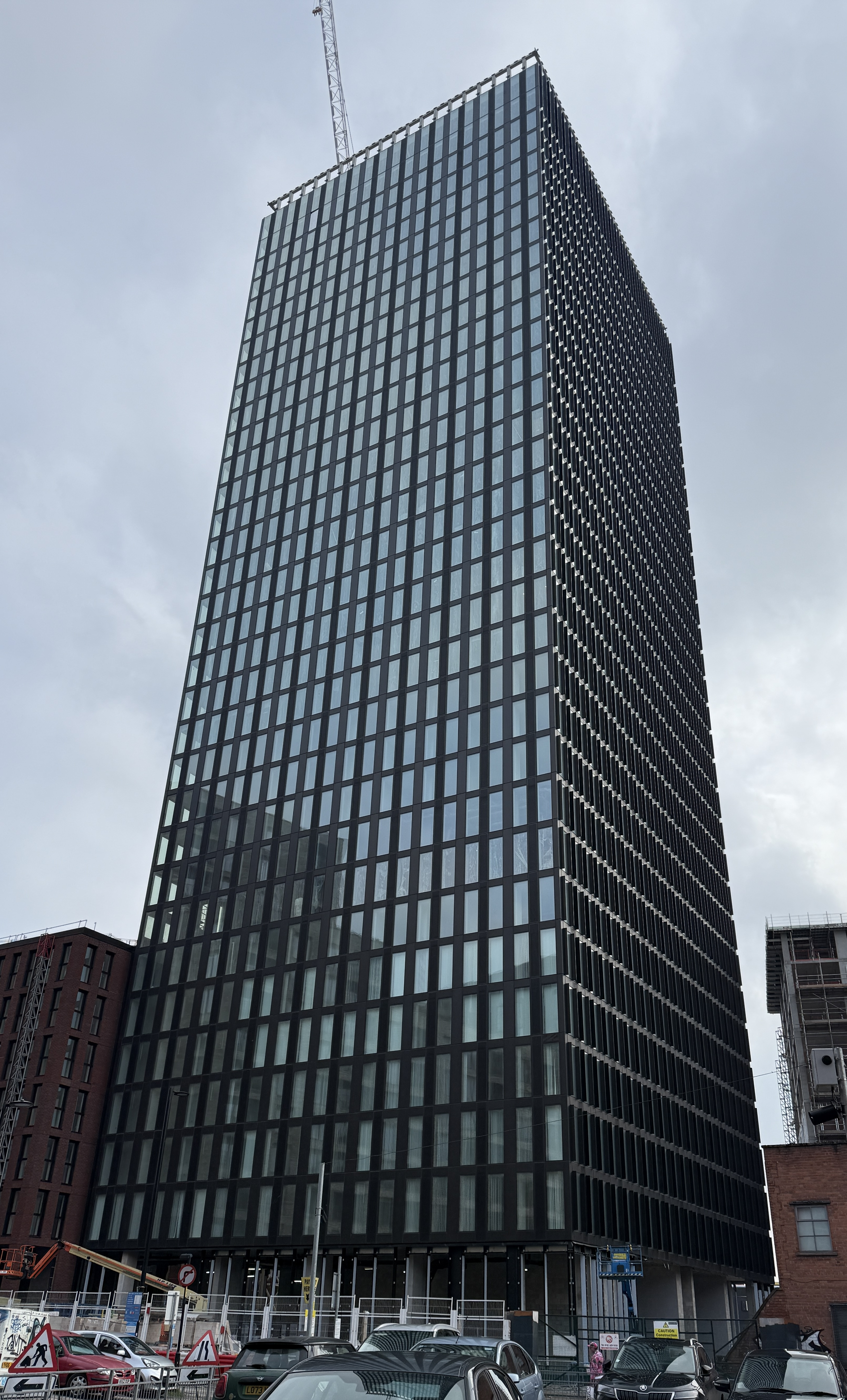
- One Port Street in February 2025

- Location within Greater Manchester

General information
- Type: Residential high-rise
- Location: Port Street, Manchester, England
- Coordinates: 53.4824°N 2.2300°W
- Construction started: 2023
- Completed: 2026; 0 years ago
- Cost: £154 million
- Owner: Select Property Group

Height
- Height: 100 m (330 ft)

Technical details
- Floor count: 7, 9, 11 and 33

Design and construction
- Architect: SimpsonHaugh
- Main contractor: Renaker

Other information
- Number of units: 477

Website
- oneportst-manchester.com

One Port Street is a high-rise residential building in Manchester, England. Located on the edge of the city's Northern Quarter, it comprises a 100-metre (330 ft), 33-storey tower fronting on to Port Street, an 11-storey block facing Great Ancoats Street, as well as 9-storey and 7-storey elements. It was designed by SimpsonHaugh architects. As of June 2026, it is the 29th-tallest building in Greater Manchester.

== History ==
=== Planning ===
The planning application was originally submitted to Manchester City Council in January 2022 for a slightly taller part-34, part-11, part-9 and part-7 storey residential building comprising a total of 485 dwellings.

Following two refusals by the council's planning committee in May and June 2022 due to its proposed height, the tower was reduced from 34 storeys to 33. Planning approval was subsequently obtained in July 2022. A non material amendment was submitted to Manchester City Council in January 2023 for internal design changes and a slightly decreased total of 477 dwellings. It was approved the same month.

=== Construction ===
Construction of the building commenced in January 2023, and it was topped out in November 2024. The development was initially planned to be finished in 2025, though completed in February 2026.

== Facilities ==
One Port Street includes a 2,000-square-foot (190 m^{2}) leisure suite including a swimming pool, gym and fitness studio. A rooftop terrace called Paganini's is located on the 7-storey element.

== See also ==
- List of tallest buildings and structures in Greater Manchester
- List of tallest buildings in the United Kingdom
