= Cortland at Colliers Yard =

Residential skyscraper in Salford, England

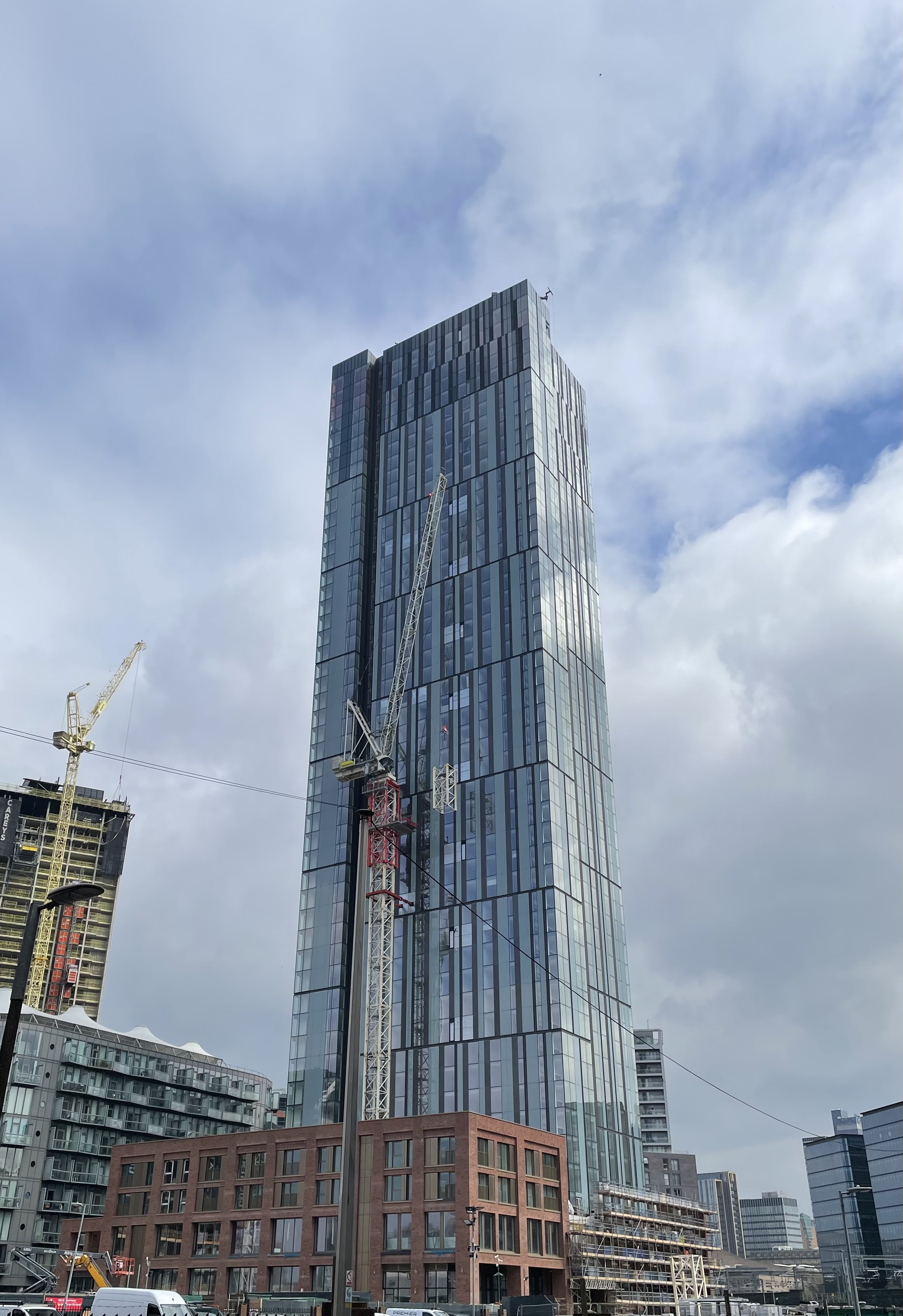
- The skyscraper in 2023

- Location within Greater Manchester
- Former names: Greengate Plot HJ

General information
- Type: Residential skyscraper
- Location: Bankside Boulevard, Greengate, Salford, England
- Coordinates: 53.4870°N 2.2494°W
- Construction started: 2020; 6 years ago
- Completed: 2023; 3 years ago
- Owner: Cortland; Madison International Realty

Height
- Height: 153 m (500 ft)

Technical details
- Floor count: 50

Design and construction
- Architect: OMI Architects
- Other designers: Denton Corker Marshall

Other information
- Number of units: 559

Website
- Official website

Cortland at Colliers Yard is a 153-metre (500 ft), 50-storey residential skyscraper on Bankside Boulevard in the Greengate area of Salford, England. It forms part of Renaker's Greengate masterplan, known as Colliers Yard, which comprises three adjacent towers: Bankside, completed in 2025, and Parkside, which received planning permission in March 2023. It was designed by OMI Architects, with Denton Corker Marshall serving as delivery architects, and constructed between 2020 and 2023. As of August 2026, it is the tallest building in Salford and the 11th-tallest in Greater Manchester.

== History ==
=== Planning ===
The planning application was submitted to Salford City Council in November 2019, with planning approval obtained in March 2020.

=== Construction ===
Construction of Cortland at Colliers Yard commenced in 2020 and the building was completed in 2023. The tower contains 559 built-to-rent apartments.

=== Sale to Cortland ===
In December 2021, the American real estate investment, development, and management company Cortland, together with Madison International Realty, bought the tower and named the project Cortland at Colliers Yard.

== See also ==
- List of tallest buildings and structures in Greater Manchester
- List of tallest buildings in the United Kingdom
