= Trinity Islands, Manchester =

Skyscraper cluster in Manchester, England

Coordinates: 53.4765°N 2.2618°W

Trinity Island
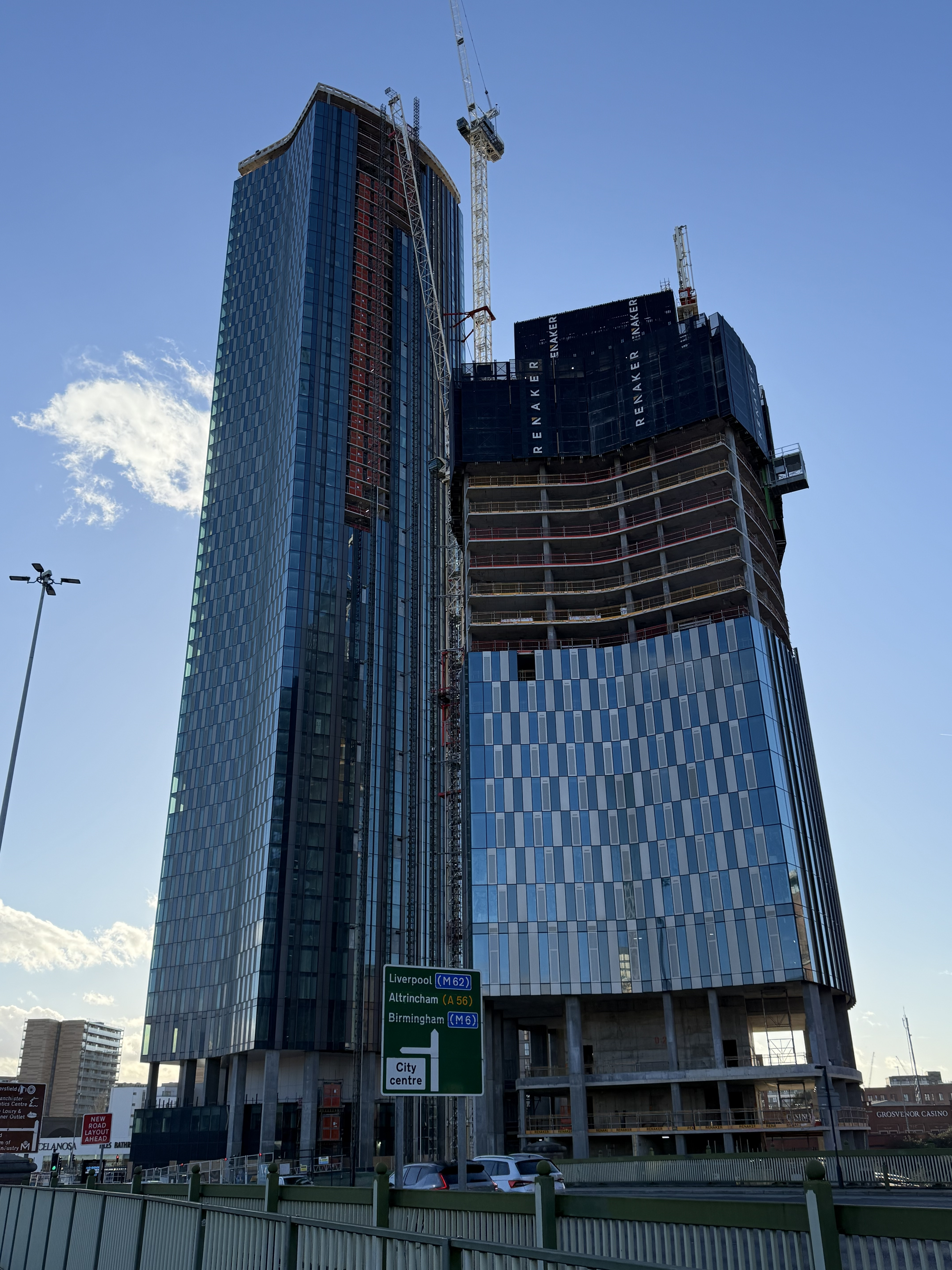
- Vista River Gardens (left) and Trinity Heights (right) under construction, January 2025

- Location within Greater Manchester
- Former names: Trinity Islands

General information
- Status: Trinity Heights: topped out Vista River Gardens: completed
- Type: Residential
- Location: Water Street, Manchester, England
- Construction started: 2022 (Vista River Gardens and Trinity Heights)
- Estimated completion: 2026 (Vista River Gardens); 2026 (Trinity Heights)
- Cost: £741 million
- Owner: Starlight Investments (Trinity Heights)

Height
- Roof: Trinity Heights: 183 m (600 ft); Vista River Gardens: 169 m (555 ft)

Technical details
- Floor count: Trinity Heights: 60; Vista River Gardens: 55

Design and construction
- Architect: SimpsonHaugh
- Developer: Renaker
- Structural engineer: WSP

Other information
- Number of units: 1,016

Trinity Island (formerly part of the wider Trinity Islands scheme) is a residential skyscraper cluster under construction in Manchester, England. The original proposal comprised four towers across two sites collectively known as Trinity Islands; the first site is now the singular Trinity Island, while the second has been rebranded as St John's Waterside. Trinity Island consists of two towers between 55 and 60 storeys: Trinity Heights at 183 metres (600 ft) and Vista River Gardens at 169 m (555 ft). Designed by SimpsonHaugh, the development includes 1,016 apartments with a total build cost of £741 million. The second site, St John's Waterside, also comprises two towers, with construction of the first, West Gate, beginning in May 2026.

In January 2026, the 60‑storey Trinity Heights topped out and became the second-tallest building in Greater Manchester, overtaking both Vista River Gardens and Beetham Tower.

== History ==
=== Original proposal ===
The project began when the original developer Allied London proposed five towers on the site, with the tallest – at 67 storeys – reaching a height of 213 m (699 ft). If built, this tower would have overtaken Deansgate Square South Tower to be the tallest building in Greater Manchester, as well as the tallest building in the United Kingdom outside London. The scheme would have delivered around 1,390 homes, costing approximately £1.3 billion. This development was approved by Manchester City Council in July 2017.

=== Revised proposal ===
The site was subsequently sold to developer Renaker in 2018 for £13.4 million, who redesigned the scheme and lodged an application for four towers containing 1,950 apartments with Manchester City Council in December 2021. Planning approval was obtained in February 2022.

=== Construction ===
Construction of the first tower, Vista River Gardens at Trinity Island (formerly Building D2) (169 m (555 ft)), began in 2022. The building topped out in August 2025, with completion expected in 2026.

Construction of the second tower, Building D1 (183 m (600 ft)), also began in 2022. The tower topped out in January 2026 and was officially named Trinity Heights, becoming the second-tallest building in Greater Manchester.

=== Sale to Starlight ===
In November 2024, the Canadian real estate investment and asset management company Starlight Investments bought Trinity Heights from Renaker.

== Gallery ==
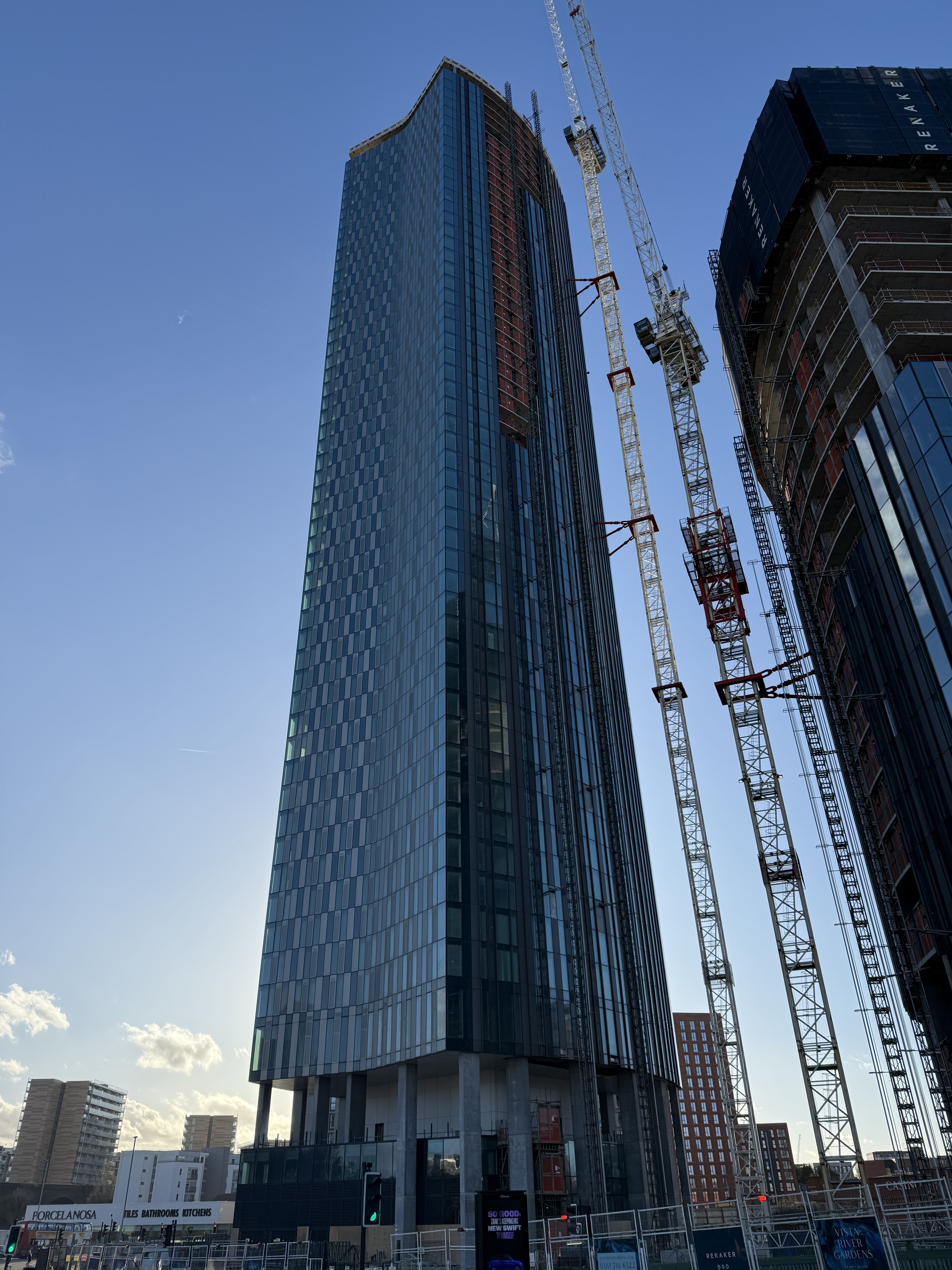
Vista River Gardens under construction in January 2025

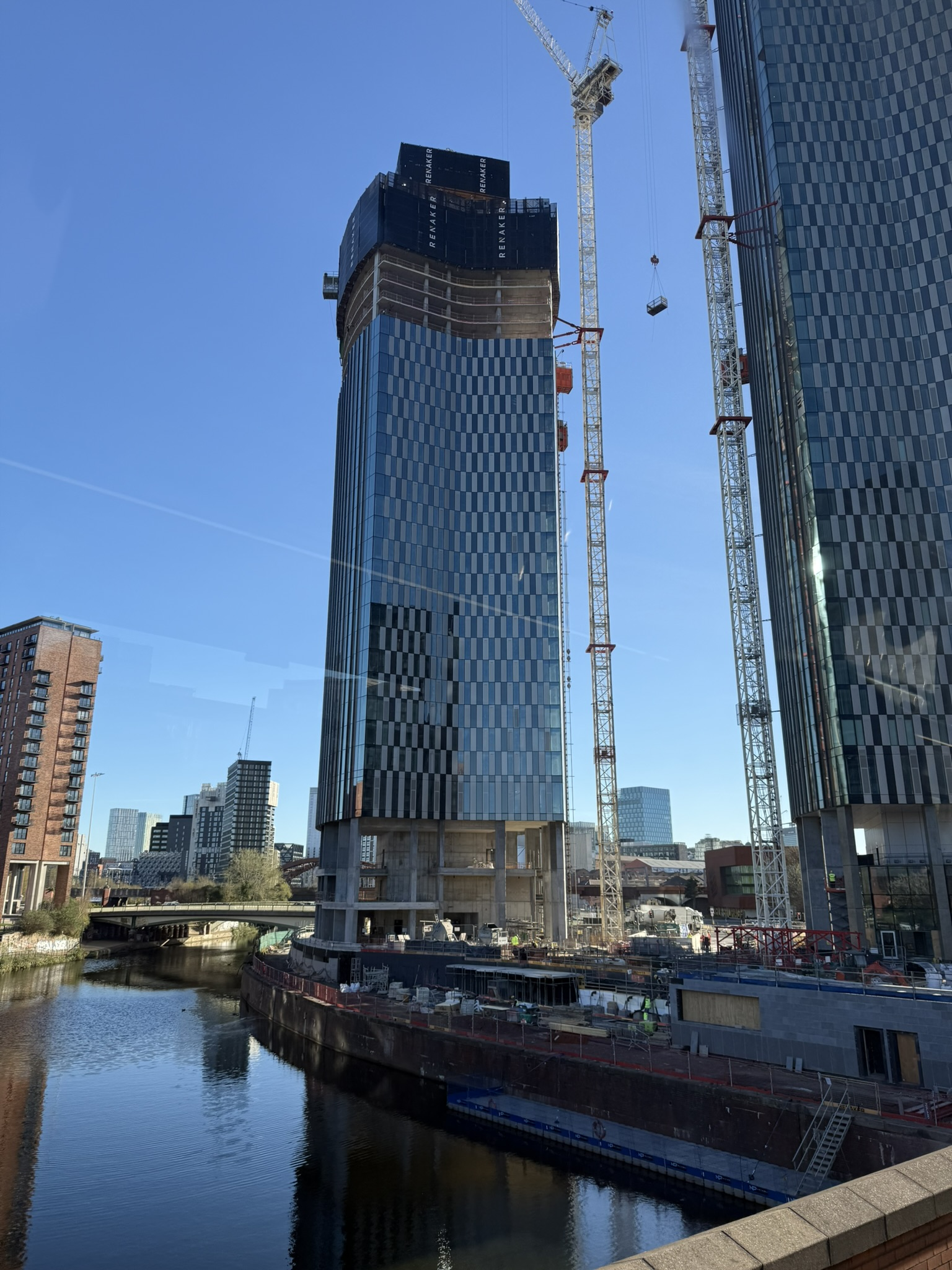
Trinity Heights under construction in April 2025

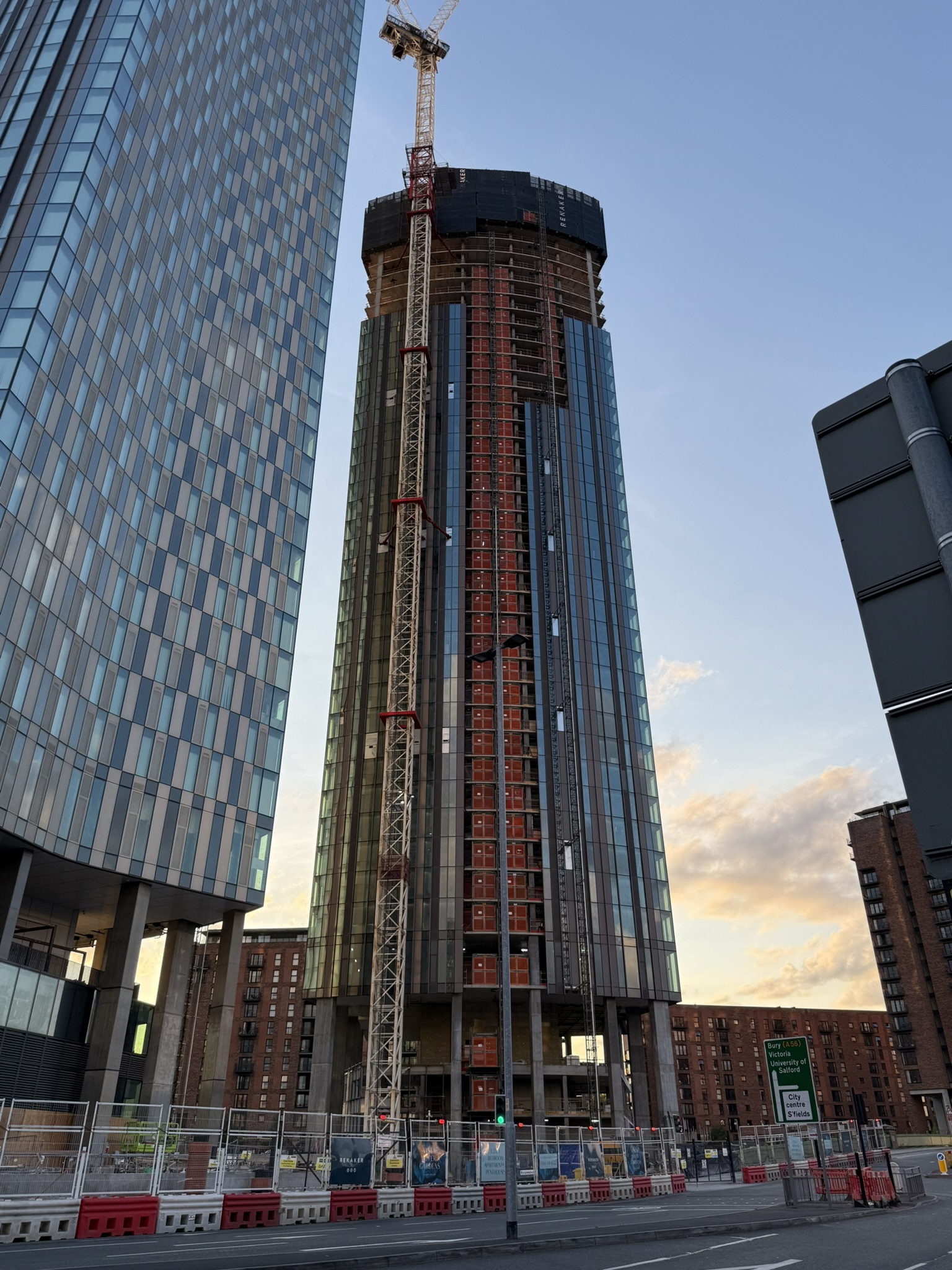
Trinity Heights under construction in May 2025

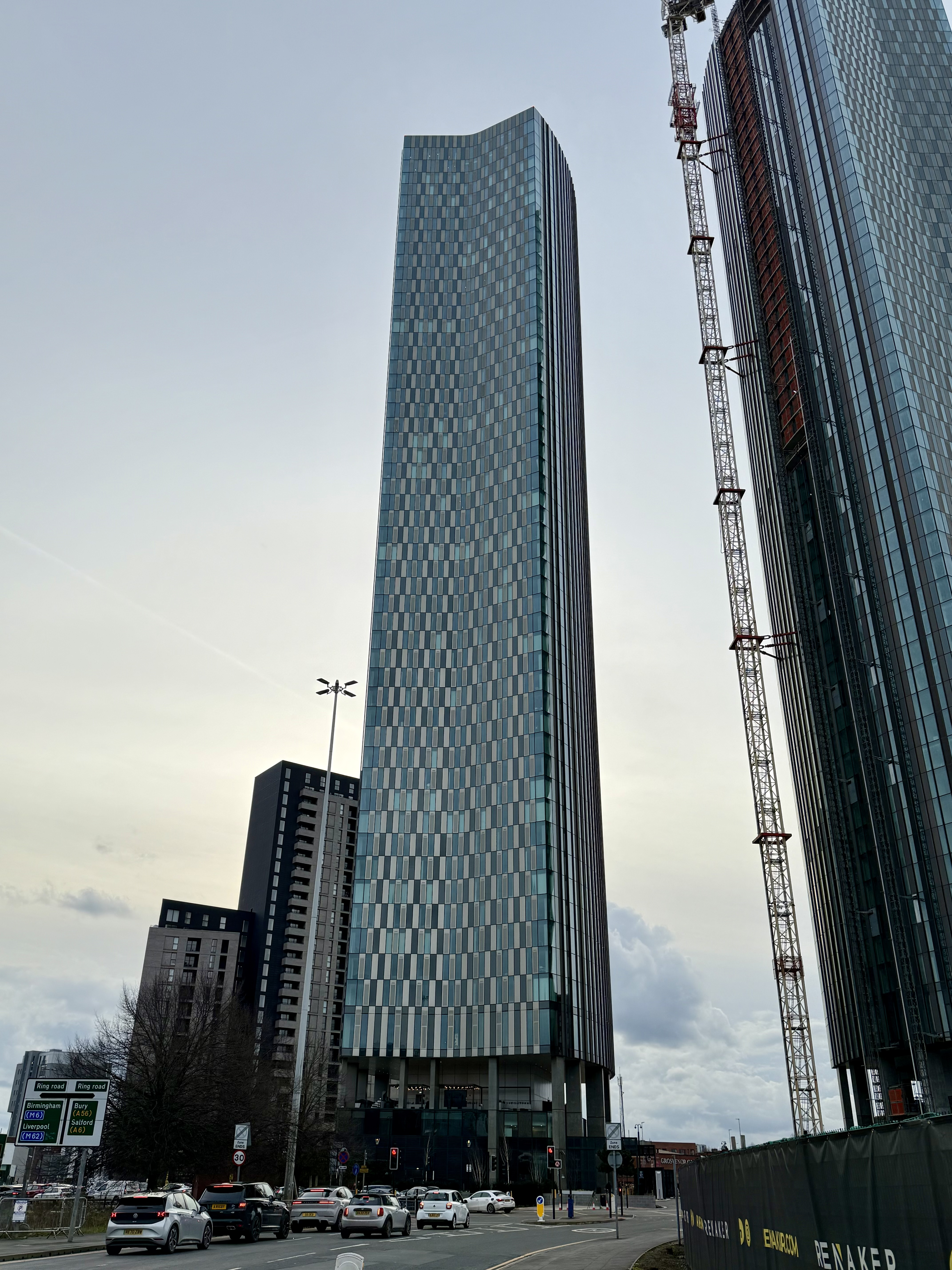
Vista River Gardens in February 2026

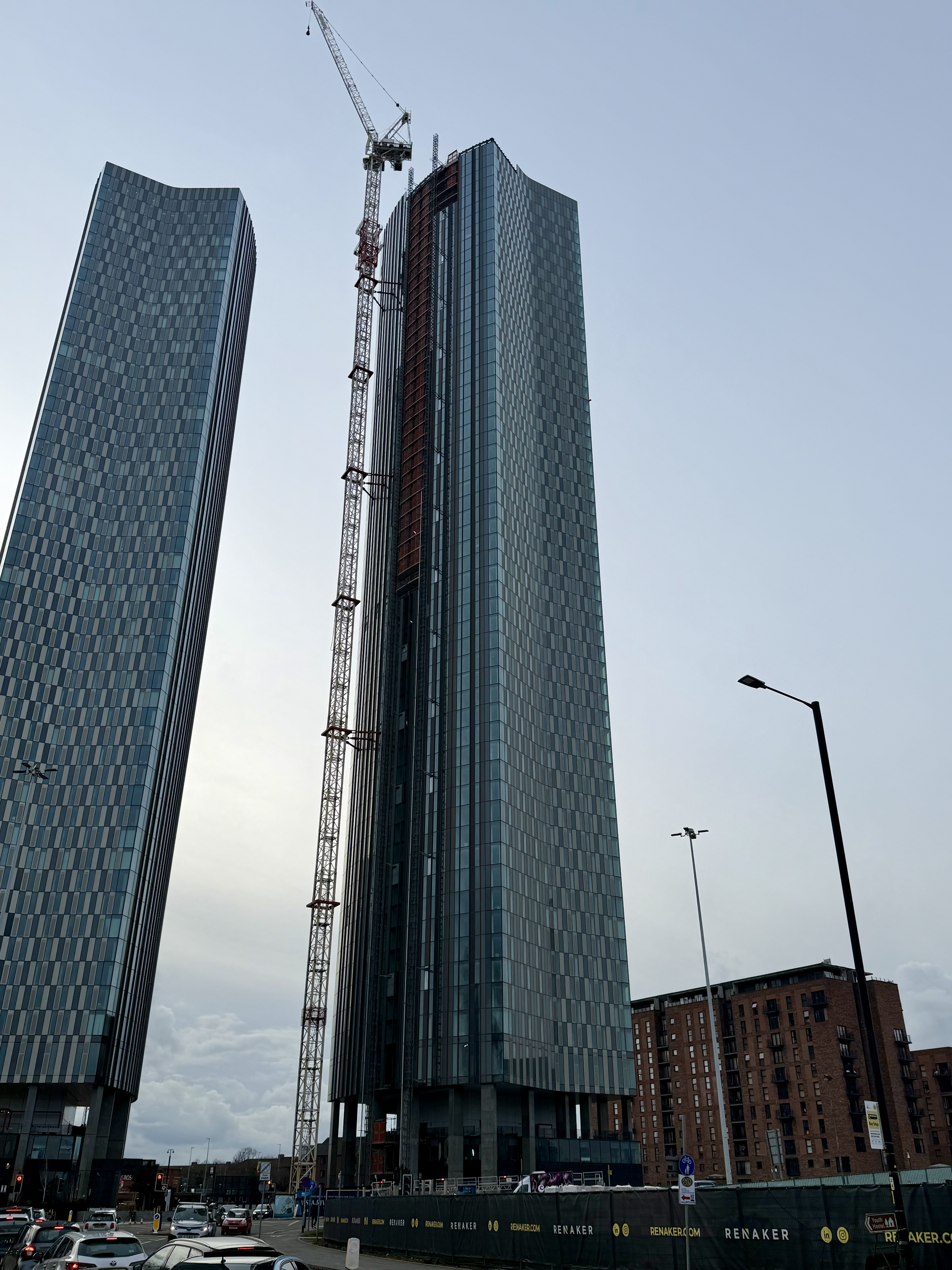
Trinity Heights topped out in February 2026

== See also ==
- List of tallest buildings and structures in Greater Manchester
- List of tallest buildings in the United Kingdom
