= Three60, Manchester =

Residential skyscraper in Manchester, England

Three60
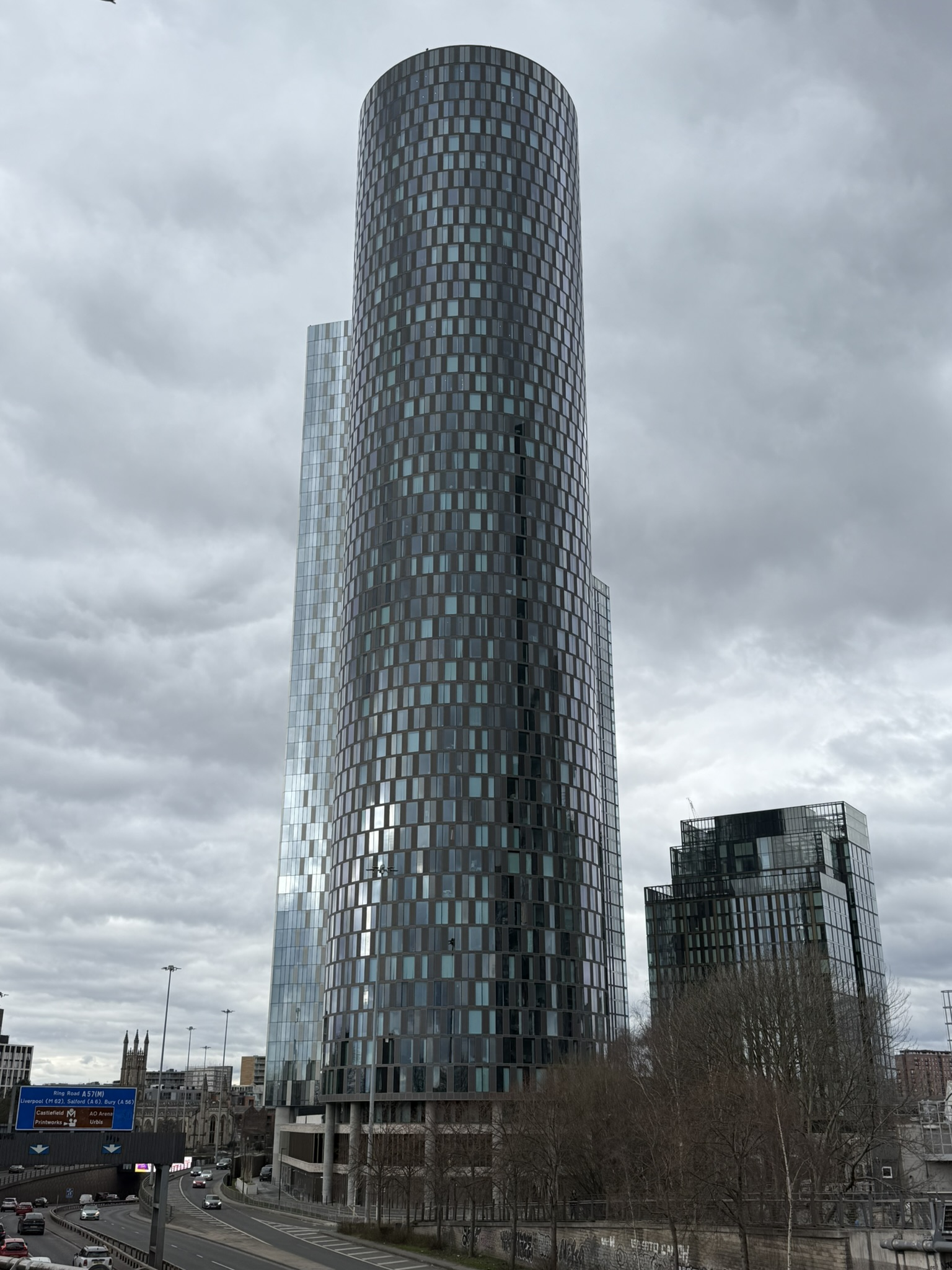
- Three60 with Victoria Residence (right), March 2025

- Location within Greater Manchester
- Former names: The Cylinder; Great Jackson Street Plot C5–6

General information
- Type: Residential skyscraper
- Location: Crown Street, Manchester, England
- Coordinates: 53.47151°N 2.25470°W
- Construction started: 2021
- Completed: 2024; 2 years ago
- Owner: Renaker

Height
- Height: 154 m (506 ft)

Technical details
- Floor count: 51

Design and construction
- Architect: SimpsonHaugh
- Developer: Renaker

Other information
- Number of units: 441

Website
- three60newjackson.com

Three60 is a cylindrical residential skyscraper on Crown Street in Manchester, England. The building is part of the second phase of the Crown Street development area at the southern end of Deansgate in the city centre, behind the Deansgate Square skyscraper cluster. It was designed by SimpsonHaugh architects. At 154 metres (506 ft), as of January 2026 the 51-storey tower is the sixth-tallest building in Greater Manchester, slightly taller than its sister tower The Blade.

== History ==
=== Planning ===
The planning application was submitted to Manchester City Council in April 2020 for two adjacent towers, The Cylinder (subsequently renamed Three60) and The Blade, to form the second phase of developer Renaker's Crown Street development, consisting of a combined total of 855 apartments across 950,000 sq ft (88,000 m^{2}) of residential space. Three60 was to contain 441 apartments. The towers were designed to connect at the lower levels by a podium containing 5,200 sq ft (480 m^{2}) of commercial space.

Planning approval was obtained in July 2020.

=== Construction ===
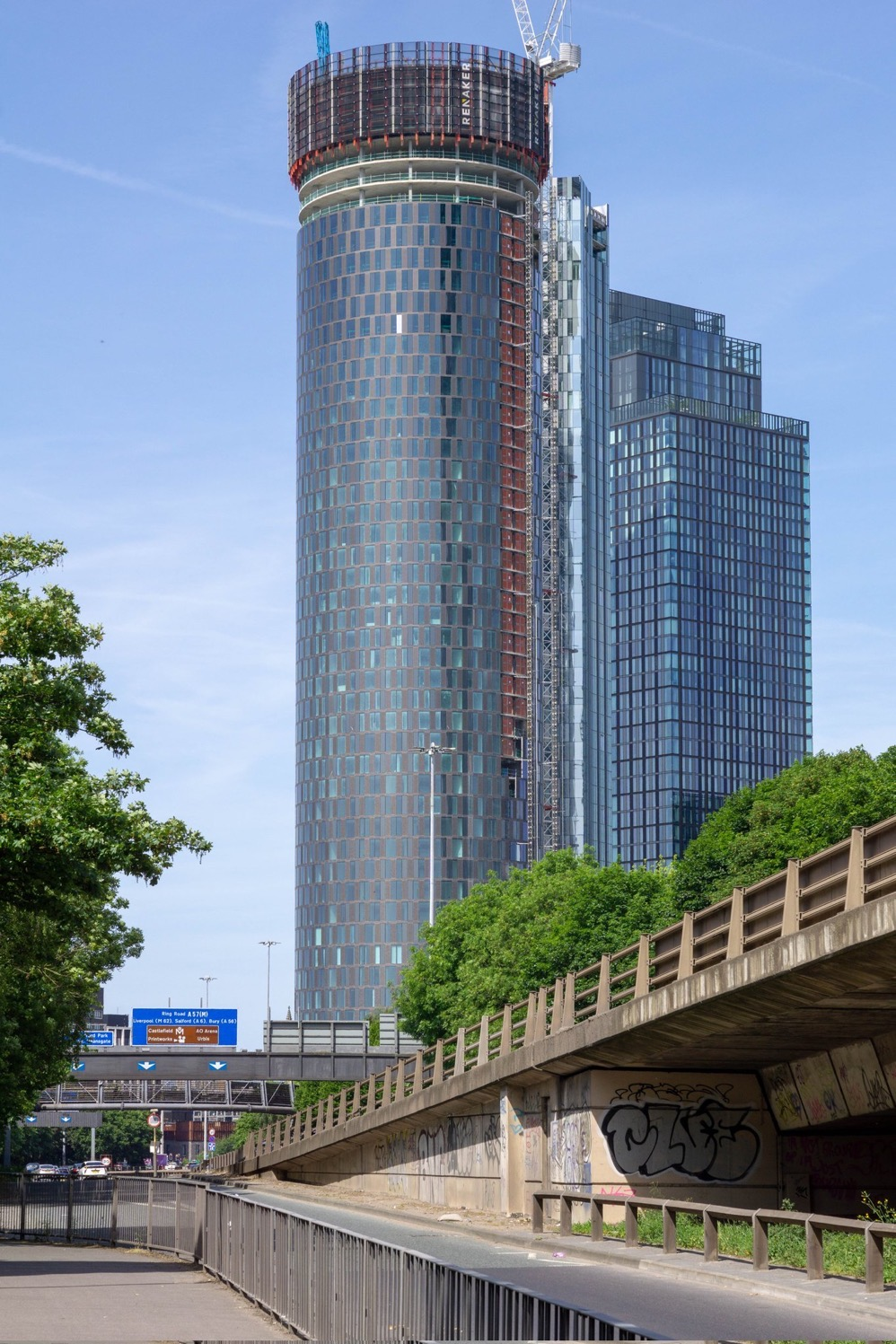
Three60 nearing completion in June 2023

Construction of the building commenced in 2021. In March 2022, the Greater Manchester Combined Authority approved a £62.3 million loan to Renaker for the development project. Three60 was expected to be completed by spring 2024, and confirmation of its completion was announced in May of that year.

The site of the two towers covers 2.7 acres (1.1 ha) and is next to Chester Road roundabout and the Mancunian Way.

== See also ==
- Elizabeth Tower, adjacent tower which comprises the first phase of the Crown Street development area
- List of tallest buildings and structures in Greater Manchester
- List of tallest buildings in the United Kingdom
