= Elizabeth Tower, Manchester =

Residential skyscraper in Manchester, England

Elizabeth Tower
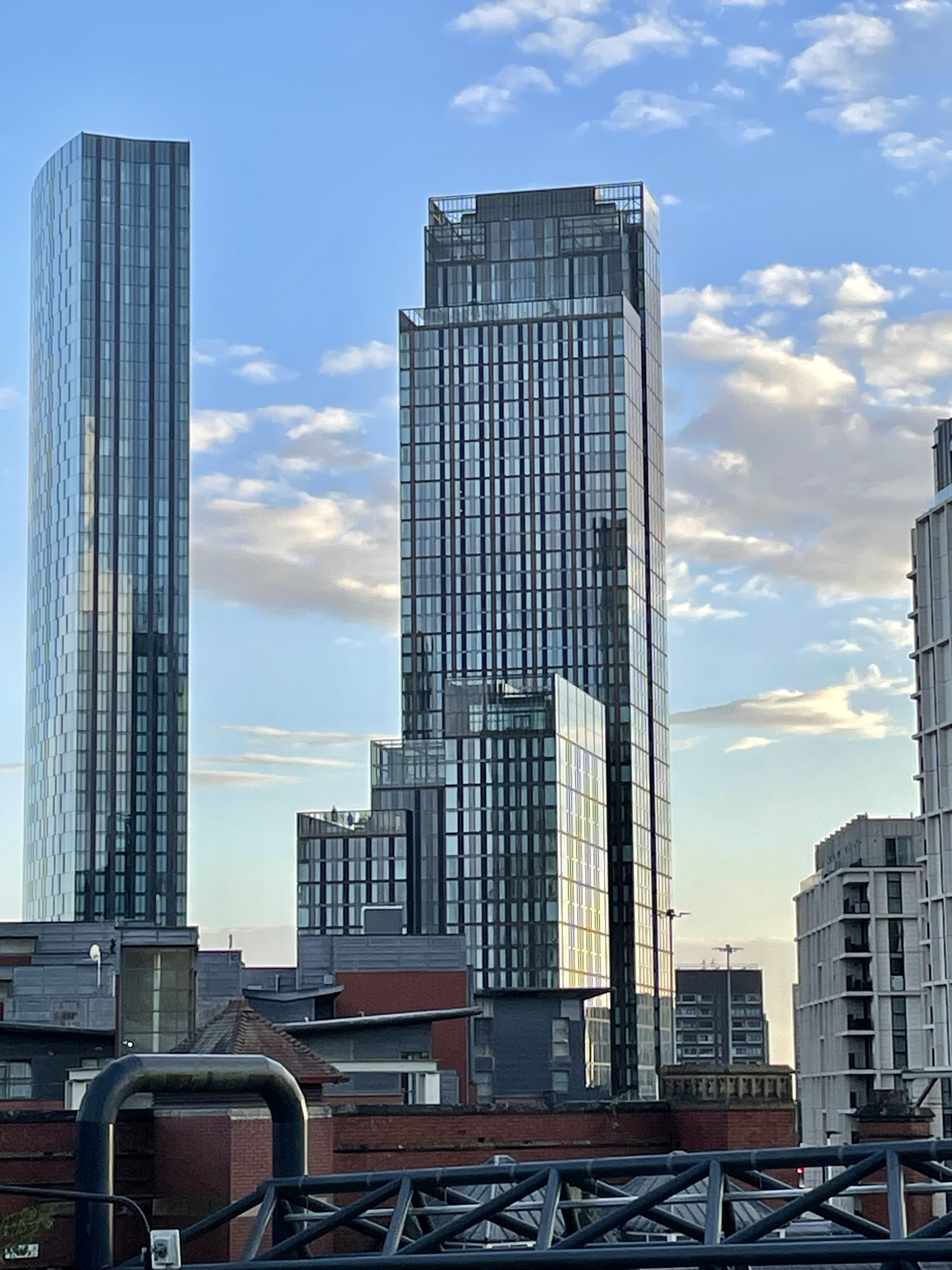
- Elizabeth Tower with Victoria Residence (lower centre) and The Blade (left), August 2023

- Location within Greater Manchester

General information
- Type: Residential skyscraper
- Location: Silvercroft Street, Manchester, England
- Coordinates: 53.47248°N 2.25537°W
- Construction started: 2018
- Completed: 2022; 4 years ago
- Owner: Renaker

Height
- Height: 153 m (501 ft)

Technical details
- Floor count: 52

Design and construction
- Architect: SimpsonHaugh

Website
- Official website

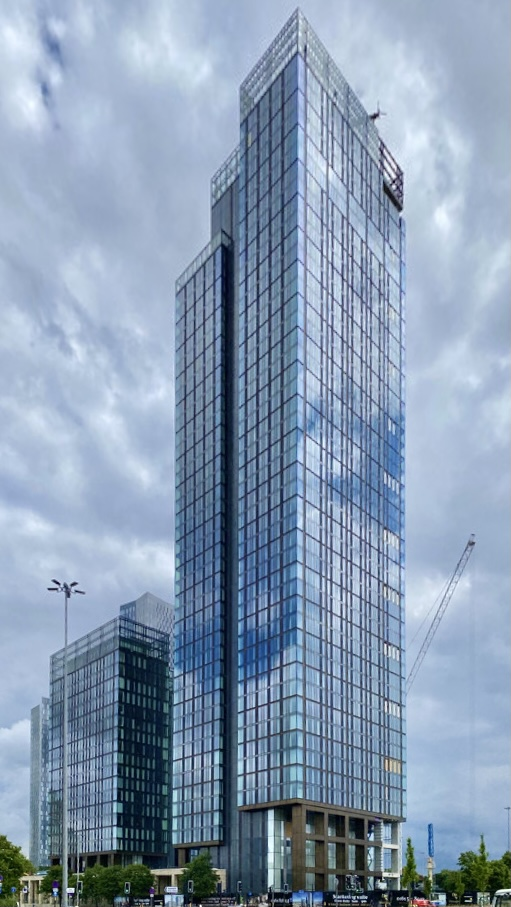
Elizabeth Tower with Victoria Residence (left) in 2021

Elizabeth Tower is a 153-metre (501 ft), 52-storey residential skyscraper on Silvercroft Street in Manchester, England. The building is part of the first phase of the Crown Street development area at the southern end of Deansgate in the city centre, behind the Deansgate Square skyscraper cluster and adjacent to The Blade skyscraper. It was designed by SimpsonHaugh architects and developed by Renaker. As of June 2026 it is the 10th-tallest building in Greater Manchester.

== History ==
=== Planning ===
The planning application was submitted to Manchester City Council in April 2018 for two tall buildings, a 51-storey and a 21-storey tower subsequently named Elizabeth Tower and Victoria Residence respectively. The towers form the first phase of developer Renaker's Crown Street development, consisting of a combined total of 664 apartments. Elizabeth Tower contains 484 apartments. Planning approval was obtained in summer 2018.

=== Construction ===
Construction of Elizabeth Tower commenced in 2018 and completed in 2022. The smaller of the two towers, Victoria Residence, reached practical completion in November 2020.

== Facilities ==
Elizabeth Tower includes a gym, rooftop gardens, and a 20 m (66 ft) swimming pool located on the 44th floor. The swimming pool is one of the highest in Western Europe.

In August 2022, NHS Property Services signed a lease on 8,000 sq ft (740 m^{2}) across the ground and first floors for a medical centre at Elizabeth Tower.

== See also ==
- List of tallest buildings and structures in Greater Manchester
- List of tallest buildings in the United Kingdom
