= The Blade, Manchester =

Residential skyscraper in Manchester, England

The Blade
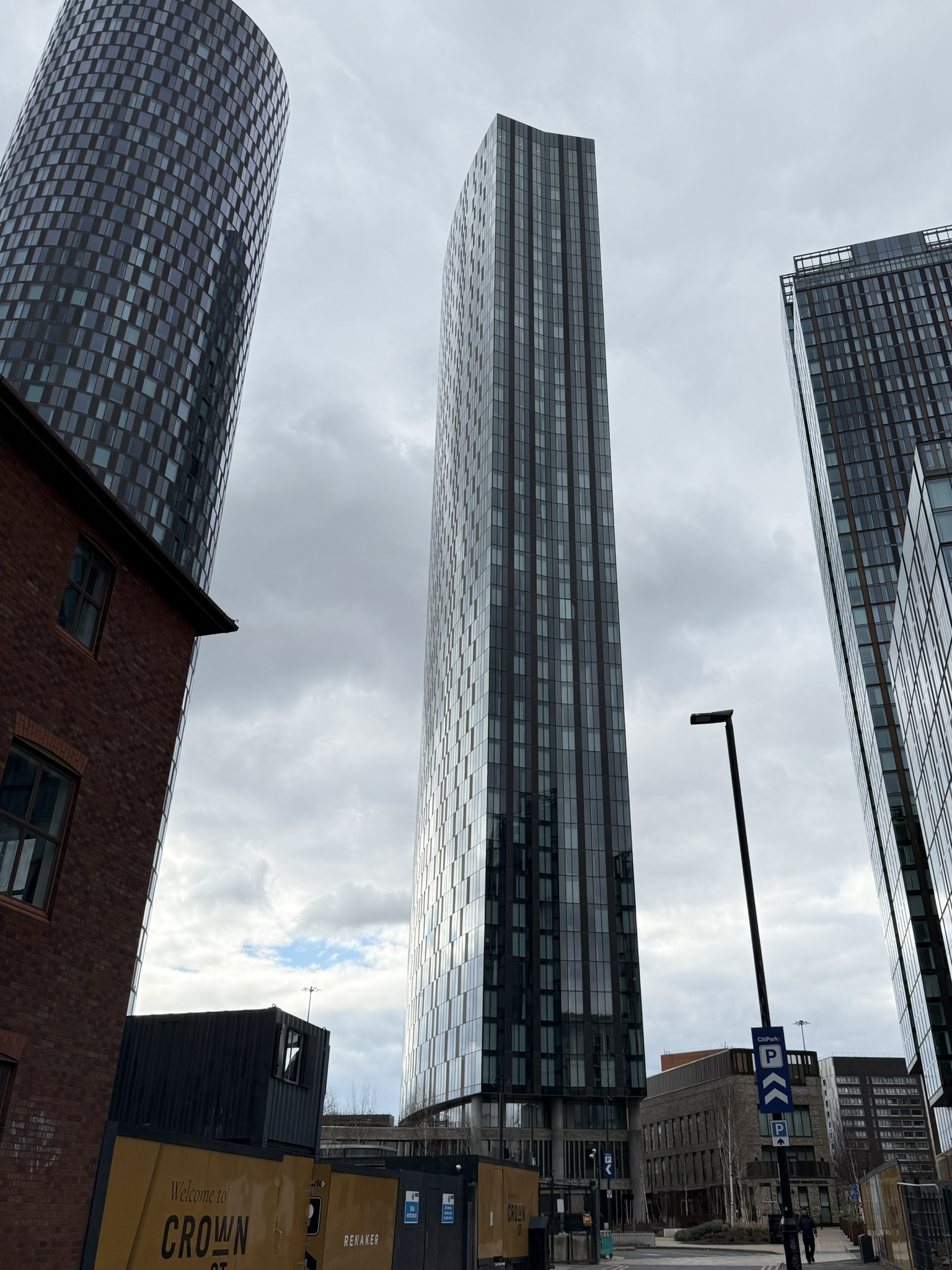
- The skyscraper in 2025

- Location within Greater Manchester

General information
- Type: Residential skyscraper
- Location: Silvercroft Street, Manchester, England
- Coordinates: 53.47213°N 2.25503°W
- Construction started: 2021
- Completed: 2023; 3 years ago
- Owner: Renaker

Height
- Height: 153 m (503 ft)

Technical details
- Floor count: 51

Design and construction
- Architect: SimpsonHaugh

Website
- thebladenewjackson.com

The Blade is a 153-metre (503 ft), 51-storey residential skyscraper on Silvercroft Street in Manchester, England. The building is part of the second phase of the Crown Street development area at the southern end of Deansgate in the city centre, behind the Deansgate Square skyscraper cluster. It was designed by SimpsonHaugh architects, and constructed between 2021 and 2023. As of June 2026, it is the ninth-tallest building in Greater Manchester, and slightly shorter than its sister tower Three60.

== History ==
=== Planning ===
The planning application was submitted to Manchester City Council in April 2020 for two adjacent towers, The Blade and The Cylinder (the latter subsequently renamed Three60), to form the second phase of developer Renaker's Crown Street development, consisting of a combined total of 855 apartments across 950,000 sq ft (88,000 m^{2}) of residential space. The Blade contains 414 apartments. The towers are to be connected at the lower levels by a podium containing 5,200 sq ft (480 m^{2}) of commercial space.

Planning approval was obtained in July 2020.

=== Construction ===
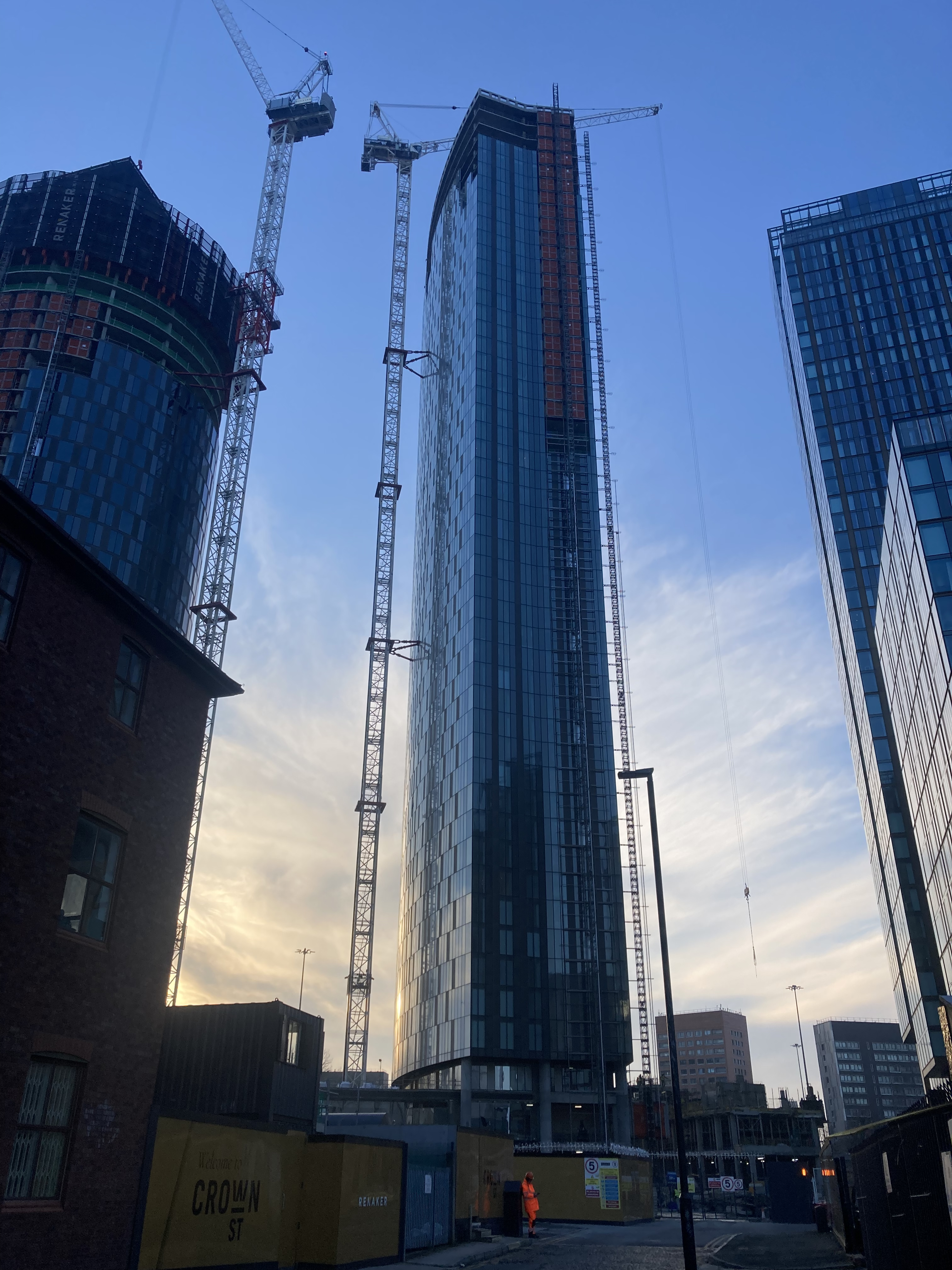
The Blade nearing completion in December 2022

Construction of the building commenced in 2021 and completed in 2023.

The site of the two towers covers 2.7 acres (1.1 ha) and is next to Chester Road roundabout and the Mancunian Way.

== See also ==
- Elizabeth Tower, adjacent tower which comprises the first phase of the Crown Street development area
- List of tallest buildings and structures in Greater Manchester
- List of tallest buildings in the United Kingdom
