= Greengate, Salford =

Area of Greater Manchester, England

Coordinates: 53.4843°N 2.252377°W

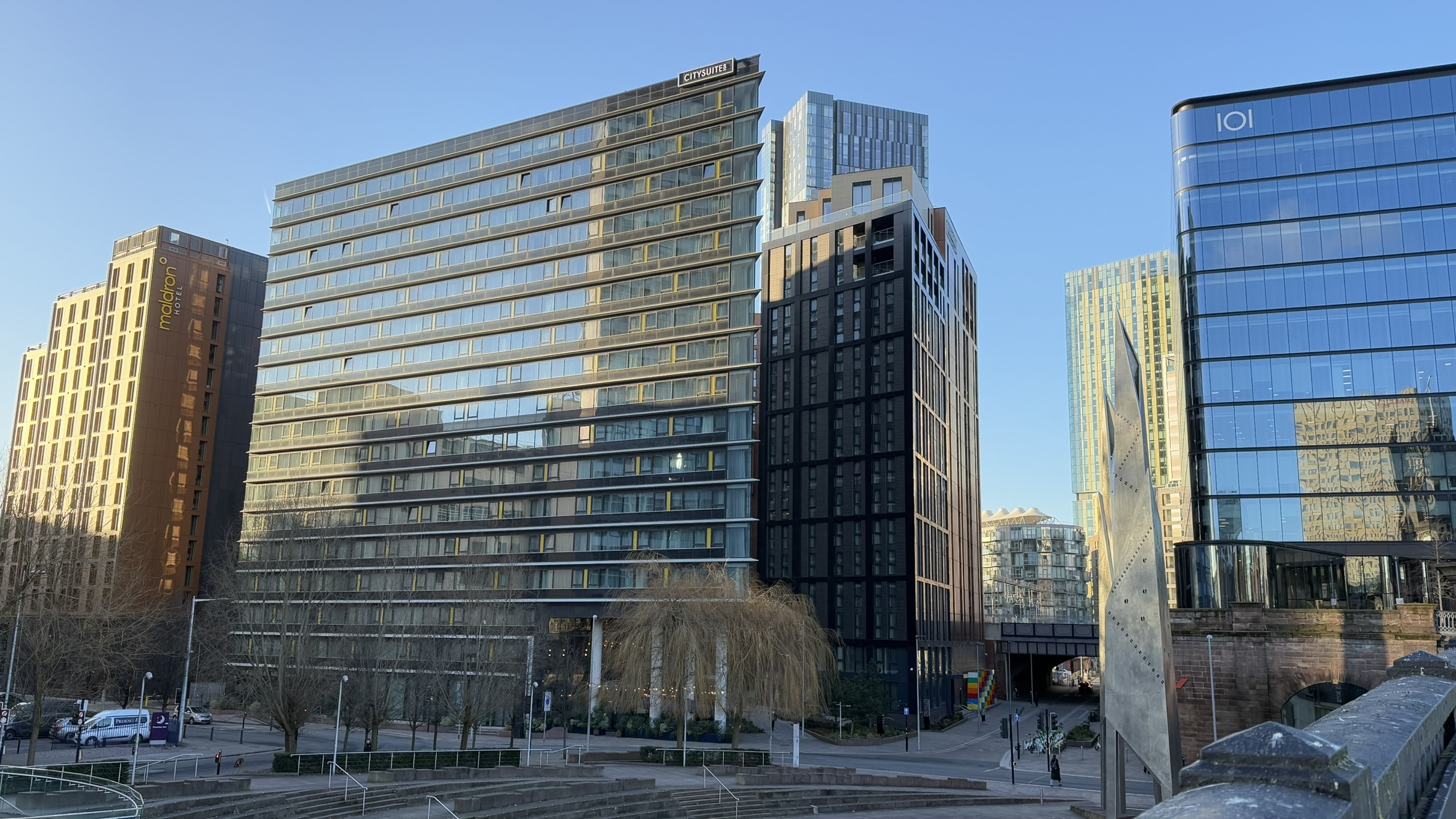
- Some buildings in Greengate as seen from Cathedral Approach on River Irwell in February 2025

- Location within Greater Manchester
- OS grid reference: SJ833986
- Metropolitan borough: Salford
- Metropolitan county: Greater Manchester
- Region: North West
- Country: England
- Sovereign state: United Kingdom
- Post town: SALFORD
- Postcode district: M3
- Dialling code: 0161
- Police: Greater Manchester
- Fire: Greater Manchester
- Ambulance: North West

Greengate is an inner-city suburb of Salford in Greater Manchester, England. It is bounded by the River Irwell, Victoria Bridge Street and Chapel Street, Blackfriars Road and Trinity Way. Greengate is the original historic core of Salford and sits within the easternmost part of the City of Salford. Since the early 2000's Greengate has experienced periods of intensive development activity and growth, benefiting from its location just across the River Irwell from the City of Manchester.

== History ==
Greengate was the oldest part and the heart of the medieval town of Salford. It was where the Hundred of Salford was based, making it the administrative centre for judicial and military purposes for an area roughly equivalent to present day Greater Manchester. It was the location of the town market and annual fairs which were held at the Salford Cross on Greengate itself. The site of the marketplace in Greengate still survives where Greengate meets Gravel Lane. This area also contained a courthouse, stocks and a conduit (pump). Salford Bridge was built over the Irwell in the 14th century, connecting Salford to Manchester. The bridge was the scene of a battle in 1642 in which Royalist supporting forces from Salford were repulsed by Parliamentarian forces who held Manchester. Greengate was noted for textiles and dyeing long before the Industrial Revolution, but from the early 19th century it developed a reputation for poverty and slum housing alongside sections of manufacturing. By the mid-19th century, almost two thirds of the population of Salford were crowded into the small area of Greengate. The area housed Salford's workhouse from 1793 until 1853.

In 1800 the clergyman William Cowherd established a new congregation in Greengate on King Street, building the chapel (Christ Church) at his own expense. The chapel saw the development of a denomination (the Bible Christian Church) which became influential in the modern establishment of the vegetarianism movement - Cowherd promulgated the doctrine that people should "eat no more meat till the world endeth" and abstain from alcoholic drinks. The message was preached in the U.S. when 41 members of the congregation in Greengate crossed the Atlantic in 1817. Cowherd was buried in the churchyard. A report in 1869 stated that burials in the churchyard took place as late as 1855 with the purported number of interred being between 30,000-35,000. In 2019 a comprehensive archaeological investigation of the site of Christ Church was conducted by Salford University's archaeological department. This uncovered 644 ledger stones, the remains of Cowherd's tomb, and evidence of the adjacent burial ground for the poor, details of which were recorded and the stones left undisturbed. The site was then set out as public open space with minimally invasive landscaping and given the name "Greengate Park". Heritage information boards and a monument to William Cowherd were incorporated into the park.

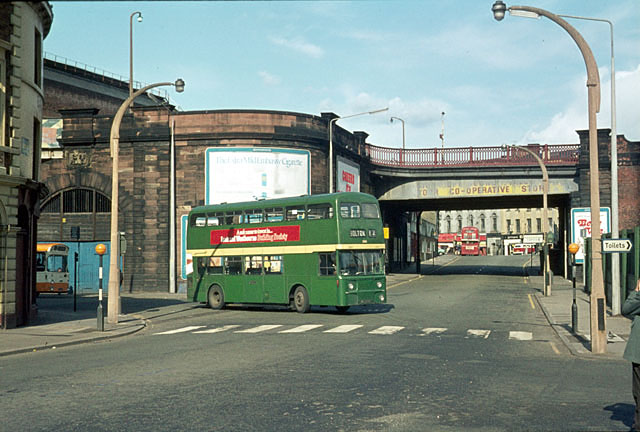
The junction of Chapel Street and Greengate in 1973 (the bus is a former Salford City Transport bus)

Collier Street Public Baths (named after the Methodist Minister, Samuel Francis Collier) were opened by Manchester and Salford Wash Baths & Laundry Company in 1855. It was usual for public baths to offer facilities for both bathing and the washing and drying of clothes and bedding, since many workers' cottages had either grossly inadequate facilities or none at all. This remained common practice until after World War I. The baths closed in 1880 when Salford Corporation opened their own baths on nearby Blackfriars Street. The men's pool was larger and more ornate than the ladies' pool. An unusual feature of the baths were the laminated wooden roof arches. The baths later became a matchbox factory. During World War II an air raid shelter was built in the deep end of the ladies' pool.

The Roman Catholic church of St Peter was built in 1863 to the design of E. W. Pugin. It was in a modest Gothic Revival style and had an eastern apse. It was demolished in 1983.

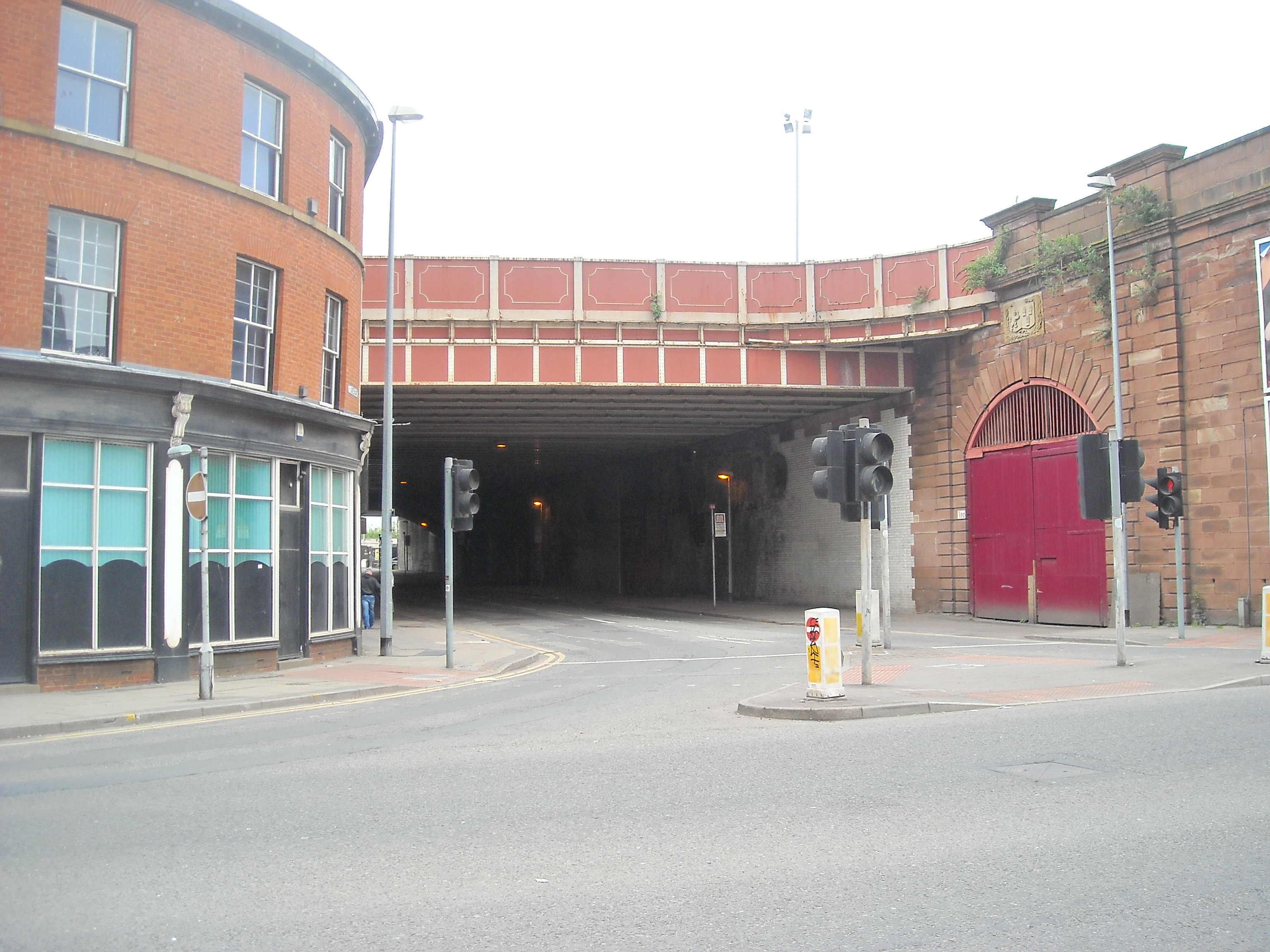
Greengate in 2014

In 1926 the second birth control clinic outside London opened to women seeking free family planning advice. The clinic provided birth control information to working class women who were unable to pay for private advice. The controversial clinic faced opposition from the Catholic Church and the medical profession but continued to offer its services to women until birth control advice was widely and freely available in the 1970s.

In the 21st century, the area has undergone a process of regeneration. The redevelopment of the former Victoria bus station, just across the Irwell from Manchester Cathedral, includes Greengate Square which has an amphitheatre for events, concerts and markets, as well as office, hotel and retail space. A new pocket park, "Greengate Park" situated between King Street and Queen Street opened on 24th November 2023.
