= Square Gardens =

Mixed-use development in Manchester, England

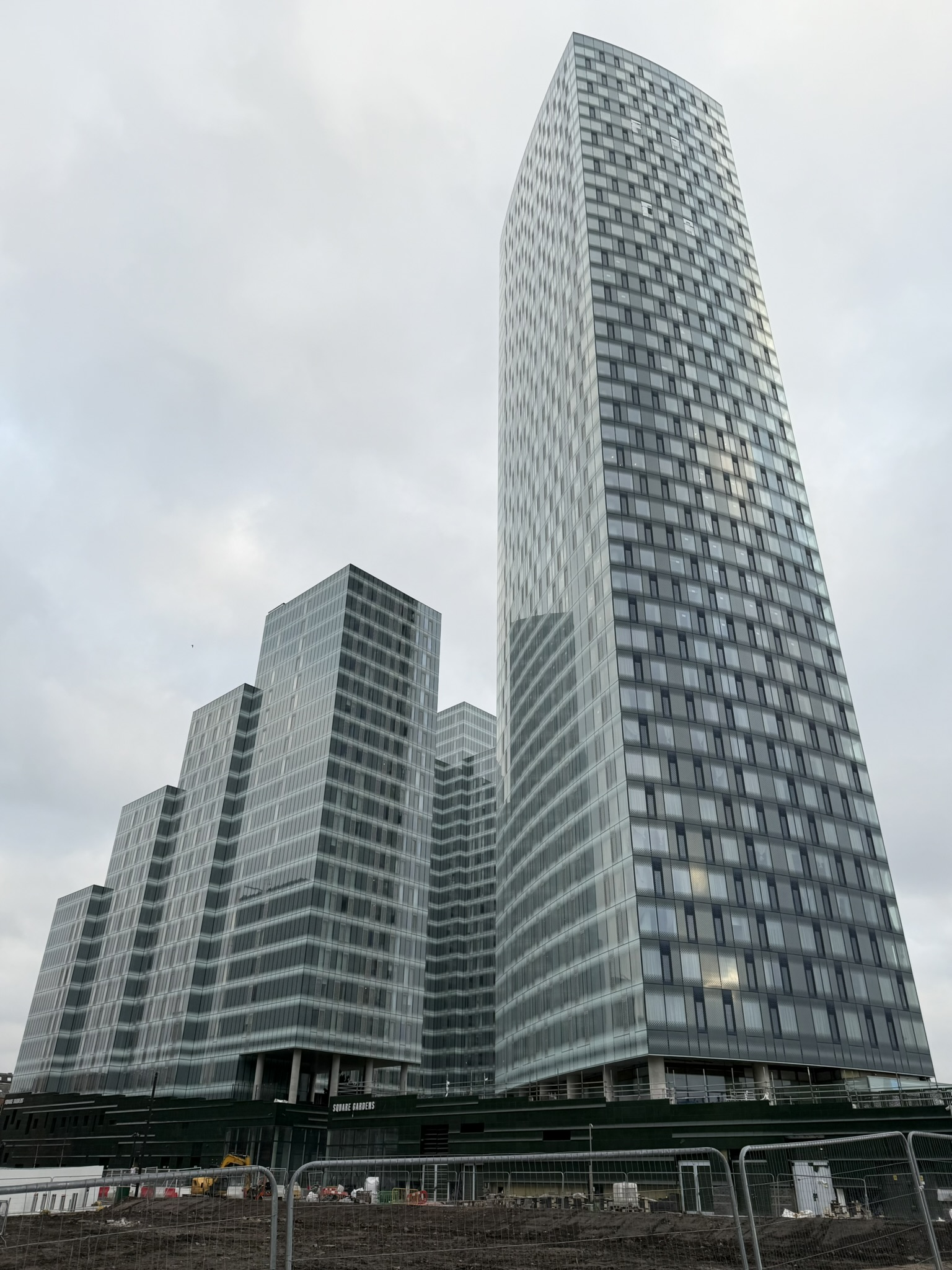
- Square Gardens in February 2025

- Location within Greater Manchester
- Former names: Downing Living; First Street Plot 11; First Street South

General information
- Type: Residential high-rise, commercial, leisure, retail
- Location: Wilmott Street, Manchester, England
- Coordinates: 53.47156°N 2.24464°W
- Construction started: 2022
- Completed: Phase 1: August 2024; Phase 2: March 2025
- Cost: £400 million
- Owner: Downing

Height
- Height: The Fernley: 139 m (456 ft); Acer Tower: 82 m (269 ft); Building A: 71 m (233 ft); Building C: 52 m (172 ft)

Technical details
- Floor count: The Fernley: 45; Acer Tower: 25; Building A: 22; Building C: 17
- Floor area: 90,112 m^{2} (969,960 sq ft)

Design and construction
- Architect: SimpsonHaugh
- Main contractor: Downing

Website
- squaregardens.com

Square Gardens is a co-living development on Willmott Street in Manchester, England. The first phase of the scheme, Acer Tower, comprises 1,187 beds across 716 units which opened in 2024. The Fernley, a 139-metre (456 ft), 45-storey residential building with 525 units, opened in June 2025 and is the 13th-tallest building in Greater Manchester as of June 2026.

The development will also provide 17,000 sq ft (1,600 m^{2}) of commercial, leisure and retail space. If fully constructed, the development will feature around 2,200 residential units in total across four buildings, which were designed by SimpsonHaugh.

== History ==
=== Planning ===
The planning application for four buildings of heights varying from 10 to 45 storeys was submitted to Manchester City Council in January 2020, with planning approval obtained in September 2020.

=== Construction ===
Enabling works on site started in January 2022, with construction commencing in March 2022. Installation of the buildings' façades started in May 2023. Completion of phase one was scheduled for August 2024, with phase two completed in March 2025.

== Facilities ==
The development includes a 3,000 sq ft (280 m^{2}) café and 14,000 sq ft (1,300 m^{2}) gym located within an amenity building which will be open to the public. Its landscaping proposals included the planting of 140 trees.

== See also ==
- List of tallest buildings and structures in Greater Manchester
- List of tallest buildings in the United Kingdom
