= Uhaus =

Residential high-rise in Manchester, England

uhaus
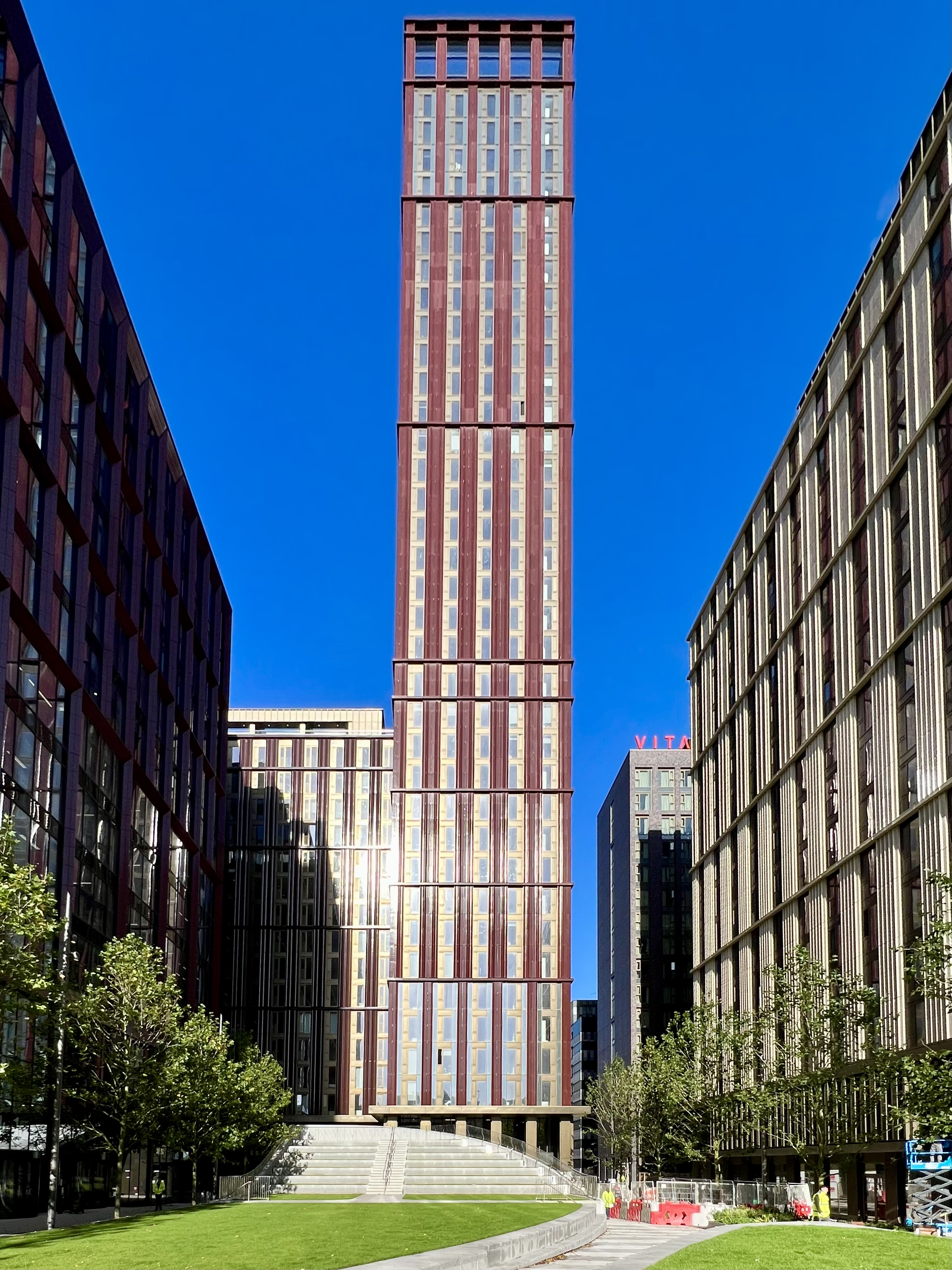
- The building in 2021

- Location within Greater Manchester
- Former names: Affinity Living Circle Square; Circle Square-Block 1 Circle Square-Building 6

General information
- Type: Residential high-rise
- Location: Circle Square, Manchester, England
- Coordinates: 53.47340°N 2.23876°W
- Construction started: 2018
- Completed: 2021; 5 years ago
- Owner: Vita Group

Height
- Height: 115 m (378 ft)

Technical details
- Floor count: 36

Design and construction
- Architect: Feilden Clegg Bradley Studios

Website
- uhaus.com

uhaus (formerly known as Affinity Living Circle Square) is a 115-metre (378 ft), 36-storey residential high-rise in Manchester, England. The building forms part of the Circle Square development on Oxford Road in the city centre, which comprises commercial buildings, student accommodation, private rented residential units, as well as retail and leisure spaces. It was designed by Feilden Clegg Bradley Studios and as of June 2026 is the 20th-tallest building in Greater Manchester.

== History ==
=== Planning ===
The planning application was submitted to Manchester City Council in April 2016 for 411 apartments in one part 17-storey, part 36-storey tower, 266 apartments within one 17-storey tower, two office towers of 18 and 14-storeys, and a 10-storey car park with more than 1,000 spaces. Planning approval was obtained in June 2016.

In November 2024, Vita Group rebranded its build-to-rent offering as 'uhaus', previously known as Vita Living. The change was introduced to reflect evolving living and working habits, particularly the rise of hybrid working and the demand for integrated amenities.

=== Construction ===
Construction of the building began in 2018 and was completed in 2021.

== Facilities ==
uhaus includes a gym, private dining rooms, residents' lounges, co-working spaces, and rooftop terraces.

The building includes a bar on the 35th floor, known as Lounge 35, which is described as Manchester's highest residents' bar.

== See also ==
- List of tallest buildings and structures in Greater Manchester
- List of tallest buildings in the United Kingdom
