= Union (towers) =

Co-living development in Manchester, England

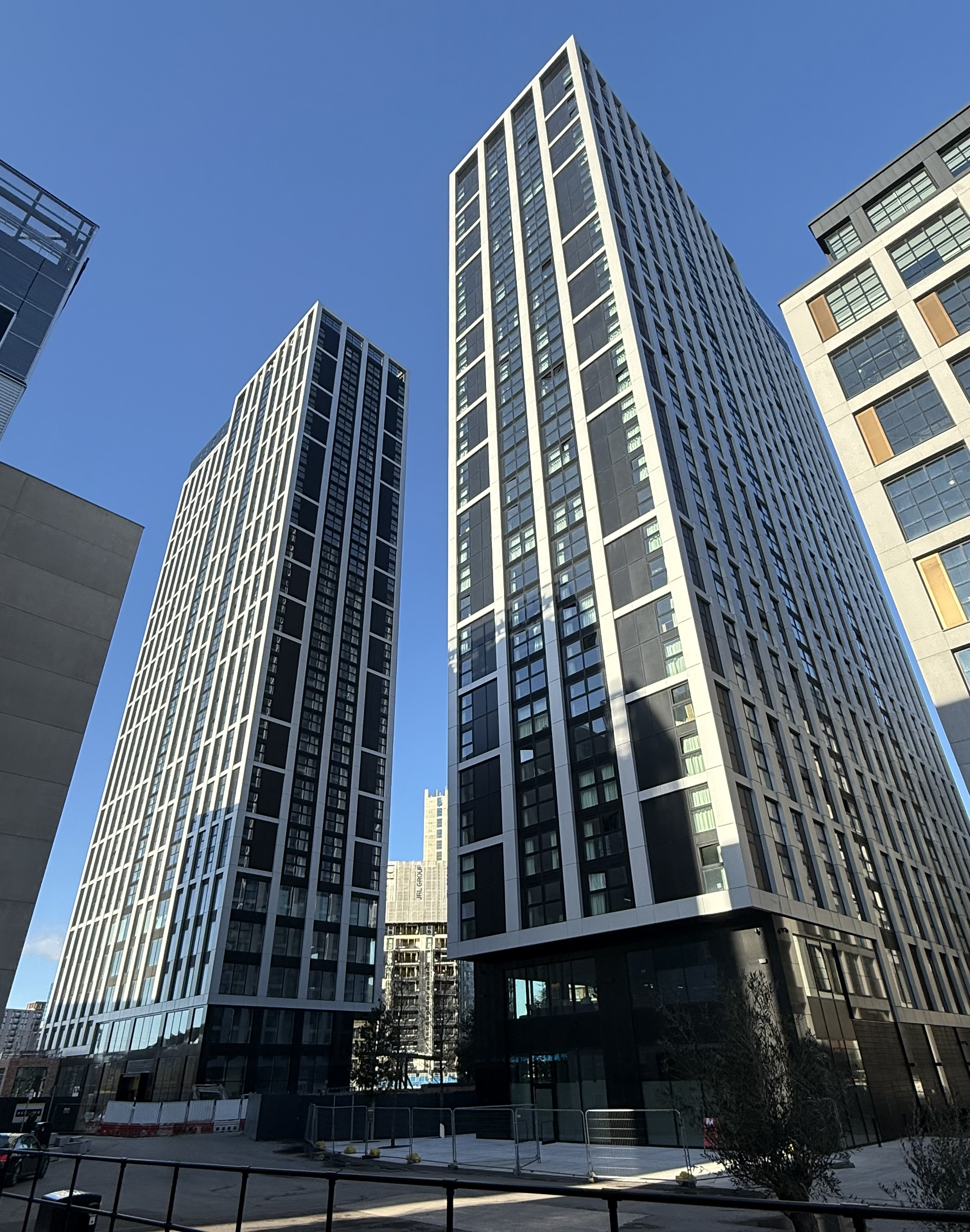
- The two towers of the Union development

- Location within Greater Manchester

General information
- Type: Co-living
- Location: Water Street, St John's, Manchester, England
- Coordinates: 53.47870°N 2.25684°W
- Completed: Tower 1: 2024; 2 years ago Tower 2: 2025; 1 year ago
- Cost: Tower 1: £191 million
- Owner: Vita Group

Height
- Height: Tower 1: 112 m (367 ft)

Technical details
- Floor count: Tower 1: 36; Tower 2: 32

Design and construction
- Architect: Denton Corker Marshall
- Main contractor: Renaker

Website
- liveunion.com

Union is a co-living development of two towers on Water Street in the St John's area of Manchester, England. The first phase, a 112-metre (367 ft), 36-storey high-rise, is the first rent-by-the-room co-living building in the United Kingdom, where potential renters are matched with housemates based on their responses to a questionnaire. It was designed by Denton Corker Marshall and as of August 2026 is the 21st-tallest building in Greater Manchester. The second phase, consisting of a 32-storey building, completed in 2025.

== History ==
=== Planning ===
The planning application for phase one was submitted to Manchester City Council in April 2020 for a 36-storey building comprising co-living units, as well as amenity, flexible commercial (Sui generis), and co-work spaces. Planning approval was obtained in November 2021.

The planning application for phase two was submitted to Manchester City Council in December 2019 for a 32-storey building comprising co-living units, amenity space, gym and flexible commercial space. Planning approval was obtained in July 2021.

=== Construction ===
Construction of phase one was completed by property developer Renaker in March 2024.

== See also ==
- List of tallest buildings and structures in Greater Manchester
- List of tallest buildings in the United Kingdom
