= List of tallest buildings and structures in Greater Manchester =

Tall buildings in Greater Manchester
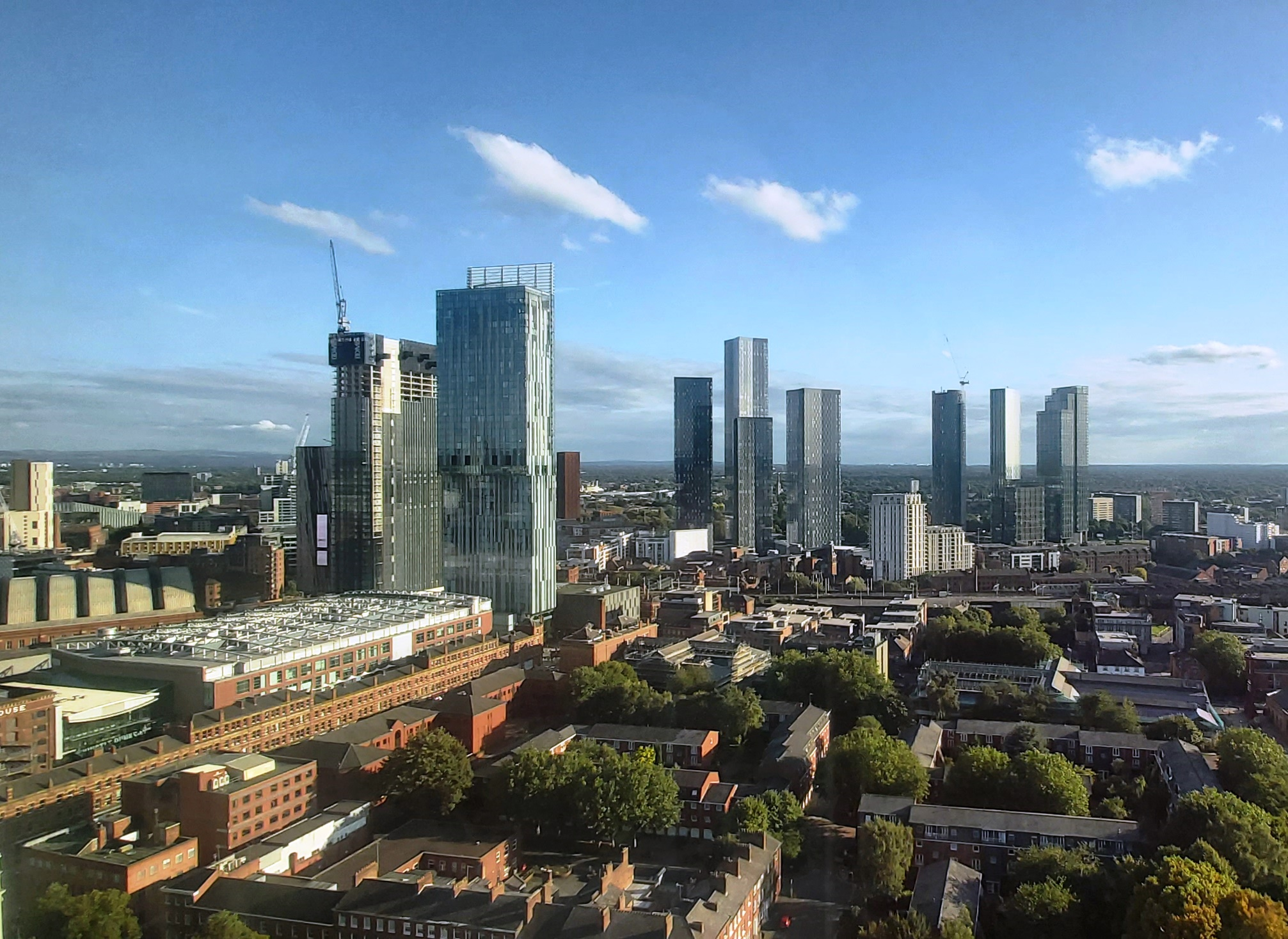
- View over Castlefield, featuring Beetham Tower (centre-left, foreground) and the New Jackson skyscraper district (background)
- Tallest building: Deansgate Square South Tower (2018)
- Tallest building height: 201 m (658 ft)

Number of tall buildings
- Taller than 100 m (328 ft): 30
- Taller than 150 m (492 ft): 11
- Taller than 200 m (656 ft): 1

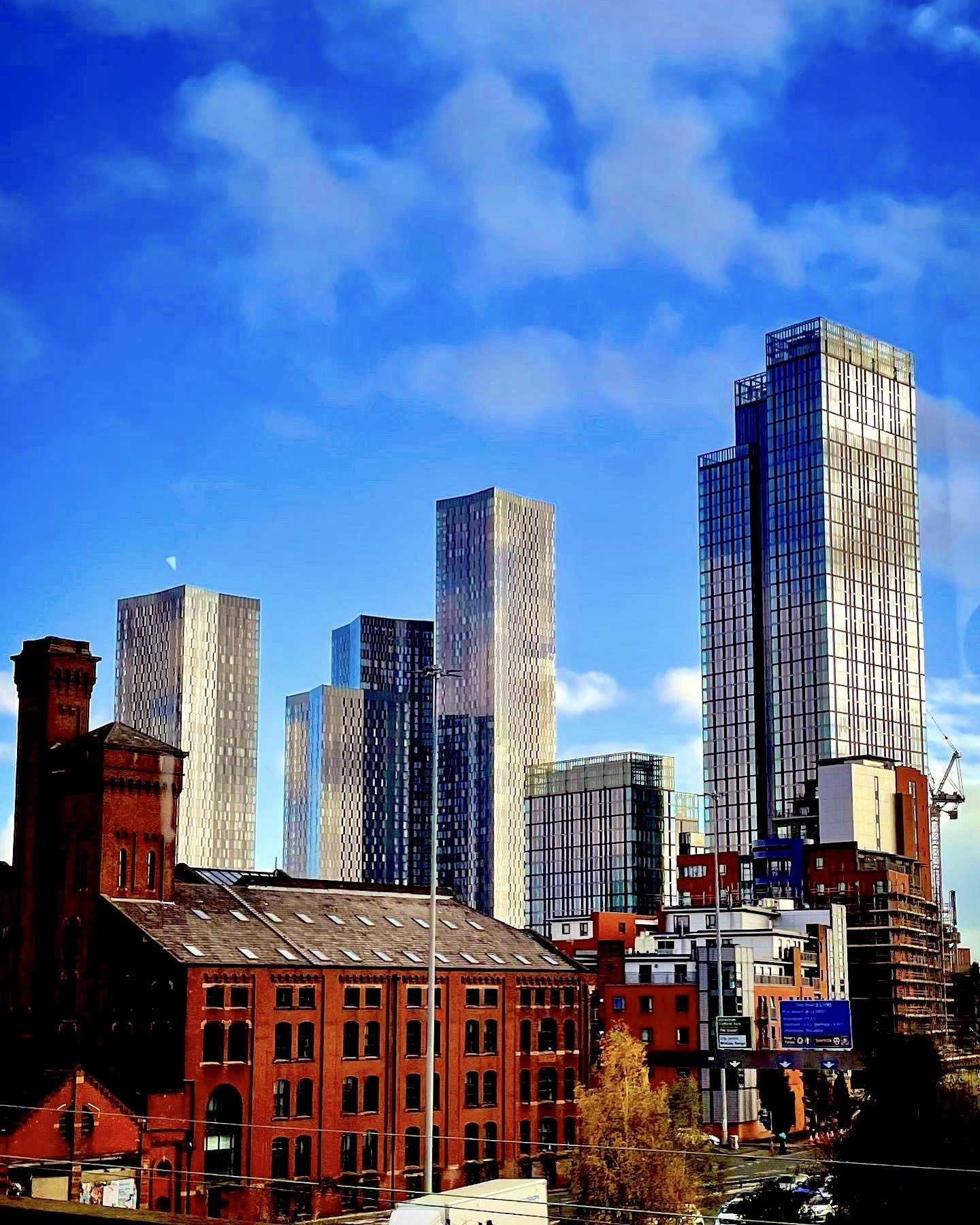
The Great Jackson Street skyscraper district. To the right sits the 153 m (501 ft) Elizabeth Tower. Beyond lies Deansgate Square, a cluster of four skyscrapers including the 201 m (658 ft) South Tower

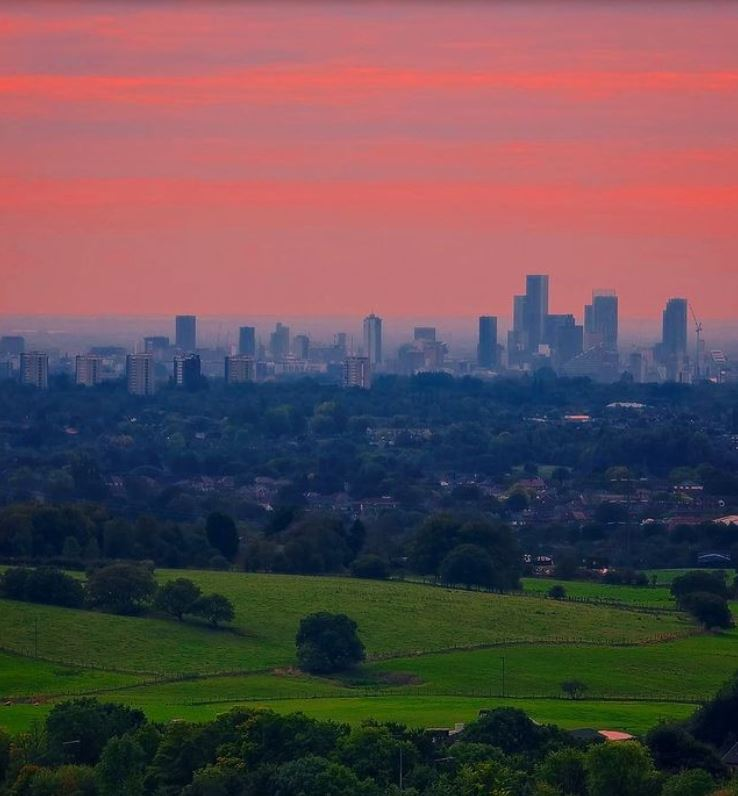
A view over central Manchester and Salford from Heaton Park, October 2021

This list of the tallest buildings and structures in Greater Manchester ranks buildings in Greater Manchester, England, by height. Greater Manchester is the second-most populous metropolitan area in the United Kingdom after Greater London, with a population of over 2.5 million. The region's tallest buildings are concentrated in central Manchester and the adjacent borough of Salford, which together form a single, continuous urban core along the River Irwell.

Since the late 2010s, central Manchester has experienced a major high-rise boom, with the number of buildings over 100 metres (330 ft) increasing from just four in 2017 to 30 in 2026. An additional six towers exceeding 100 metres are currently under construction. This represents the largest concentration of high-rises in any UK metropolitan area outside London. The tallest to date is the South Tower at Deansgate Square, completed in 2018 at 201 metres (659 ft), making it the tallest building in the UK outside London.

== History ==
Notable tall buildings were first constructed in the region during the Victorian era. These were primarily religious or administrative in nature, such Salford Cathedral, the Church of St Mary, Manchester Assize Courts, and the Manchester Town Hall Clock Tower—the latter reaching a height of 87 metres (285 ft).

The first proposed high-rise in Manchester exceeding 100 metres was the 110-metre (360 ft) Quay Street Tower, envisioned in 1948. Had it been built, it would have been the tallest tower in Europe. However, the plan was rejected as inconsiderate, given that the city was still recovering from the Manchester Blitz during the Second World War.

A first wave of tall buildings arrived in central Manchester during the 1960s and 1970s, led by the 118-metre (387 ft) CIS Tower (1962), which became the tallest in the UK at the time, and the 107-metre (351 ft) City Tower (1965).

=== The modern era skyscraper boom ===
After decades of limited high-rise construction throughout the 1980s and 1990s, the 21st century brought a dramatic resurgence. In 2006 the 169-metre (554 ft) Beetham Tower became the tallest building in the UK outside London and the first in the city to exceed 150 metres (490 ft), marking the beginning of Manchester's modern skyscraper era.

From the late 2010s onward, the combined urban core of Manchester and Salford experienced a transformational high-rise boom. A new area of central Manchester, known as New Jackson, was created and reserved for a cluster of skyscrapers. Here, the 201-metre (659 ft) South Tower, completed in 2018, became the tallest building in the UK outside London and the first outside the capital to surpass 200 metres (660 ft). Today, New Jackson features six skyscrapers above 150 metres (490 ft) and an additional two towers exceeding 100 metres (330 ft).

Outside New Jackson, the early 2020s have seen new clusters of towers constructed across other areas of the city region, adding further depth and scale. The Greengate district has become a prominent secondary high-rise area in its own right, with its tallest building being the 153-metre (502 ft) Cortland at Colliers Yard, alongside four additional buildings exceeding 100 metres.

Salford Quays has also been at the forefront of development over the past 15 years, emerging as a tertiary focal point for high-rise construction. This includes the area's first building to exceed 100 metres, the 101-metre (331 ft) Eda tower, along with six more towers completed above 75 metres (246 ft).

As of September 2026, Greater Manchester features 11 completed skyscrapers above 150 metres, 30 high-rises above 100 metres and over 200 buildings above 50 metres—by far the highest totals of any city region in the UK outside of London.

== Future skyline plans ==
Unlike most major cities in the UK, Manchester does not have any significant general height restrictions. This has enabled a number of transformative proposals that will significantly expand the central Manchester city region with new districts and amenities.

The tallest scheme is the 246-metre (807 ft) Nobu Manchester skyscraper, now under construction in the central business district beside the completed Beetham Tower. The mixed‑use residential and hotel tower will host the luxury Nobu hotel brand. Planning approval was granted in spring 2025, with construction beginning in November that year.

The current tallest proposal forms part of the newly approved Regent Park skyscraper district in Ordsall, which will sit adjacent to the New Jackson district. This district is planned to include at least 10 buildings, with the tallest potentially reaching 242 m (792 ft). Although the scheme faced objections in July 2025 regarding the loss of retail options for existing residents, approval was granted for the development in November 2025.

The second-tallest proposal is the 213-metre (699 ft) Lighthouse, planned as the focal point of the New Jackson skyscraper district by the end of the decade. As of December 2025, the Lighthouse proposals have been released but have not yet been submitted for formal planning approval. The New Jackson skyscraper district itself is still undergoing a major transformation. In addition to the Lighthouse, New Jackson has seen proposals for twin 172-metre (564 ft) 'Park Place' towers, as well as four towers under the 'Green' moniker—two planned at 154 metres and two at 141 metres (463 ft). When complete, the district will feature at least 12 skyscrapers above 150 metres (490 ft) and at least four more above 100 metres (330 ft).

Another new area for skyscrapers currently under construction is Trinity Islands in the Castlefield district. A 183-metre (600 ft) tower, Trinity Heights, is topped out alongside its twin, the 169-metre (554 ft) Vista River Gardens. They are expected to be joined by two as-yet unnamed towers 146 m (479 ft) and 120 m (390 ft) in height.

The existing Greengate skyscraper district, which as of November 2025 features four towers over 100 metres, is set to be expanded with at least three more towers, including the 123-metre (404 ft) Parkside. Although planning approval was granted in 2023, the construction schedule for Parkside has yet to be announced.

Another new neighbourhood in the north of the city, Victoria North, will also transform Manchester by the end of the decade, delivering 15,000 homes and accommodating over 40,000 new residents. Part of this area will be Red Bank, a new skyscraper district featuring several towers, including a proposal for a 181-metre (594 ft) skyscraper.

Outside these wider masterplans, there is a plethora of towers under construction, approved, or proposed throughout the city that are set to reshape the skyline over the next 10 years. Notable examples include the new Manchester United stadium, which will feature 200-metre (660 ft) masts, and St Michael's—a 144-metre (472 ft) tower currently under construction that will house the luxury W Hotel brand and is scheduled for completion in 2027.

In a European context, only six cities currently contain more than 10 completed buildings over 150 metres: Moscow, Istanbul, London, Paris, Frankfurt, and Warsaw. By the end of 2026, Manchester is projected to join this group as ongoing construction and scheduled completions are expected to bring the city's total number of completed 150 metre‑plus buildings to more than 10. If all approved and proposed towers in Greater Manchester are realised, the city region could eventually contain over 25 buildings exceeding 150 metres, placing it behind only Moscow, Istanbul, and London in the number of tall buildings.

== Tallest buildings ==
This list ranks structurally complete buildings and free-standing structures in Greater Manchester that stand at least 50 m (160 ft) tall, based on standard height measurement. This includes spires and architectural details but does not include antenna masts.

An equals sign (=) following a rank indicates the same height between two or more buildings. The "Year" column indicates the year in which a building was completed. Buildings that have been demolished are not included.

Rank	Name	Image	Height m (ft)	Floors	Year	Usage	Location	Notes
1	Deansgate Square South Tower		201 (658)	65	2018	Residential	Castlefield, Manchester	Tallest building in the UK outside London. As of June 2026, it is the 12th-tallest by height in the UK.
2	Trinity Heights		183 (600)	60	2026	Residential	Castlefield, Manchester	Topped out in January 2026, it is the taller of the two towers on Trinity Island and stands in close proximity to the Great Jackson skyscraper district.
3	Vista River Gardens		169 (555)	55	2025	Residential	Castlefield, Manchester	Topped out in August 2025, it is one of two residential towers on Trinity Island and stands in close proximity to the Great Jackson skyscraper district.
4	Beetham Tower		169 (554)	47	2006	Hotel / Residential	Castlefield, Manchester	Architectural height is 169 m (554 ft); roof height is 158 m (518 ft). Upon completion in 2006, it became the tallest building in Greater Manchester, surpassing the CIS Tower by over 50 m (160 ft).
5	Deansgate Square East Tower		158 (518)	50	2019	Residential	Castlefield, Manchester	Fifth-tallest building in the UK outside London and the second-tallest in the Deansgate Square cluster.
6	Three60		154 (506)	51	2023	Residential	Castlefield, Manchester	Part of the second phase of the Crown Street development area at the southern end of Deansgate behind the Deansgate Square development. It is situated next to its sister building The Blade.
7=	Contour - Green		154 (505)	51	2025	Residential	New Jackson, Castlefield, Manchester	Part of the New Jackson skyscraper district, the twin towers feature bevelled edges along the height of the towers. Identical in design, the towers are differentiated by their distinct colours - Green and Blue. Topped out in December 2025.
7=	Contour - Blue		154 (505)	51	2026	Residential	New Jackson, Castlefield, Manchester	Part of the New Jackson skyscraper district, the twin towers feature bevelled edges along the height of the towers. Identical in design, the towers are differentiated by their distinct colours - Green and Blue. Construction began in April 2024, topped out in June 2026.
9	The Blade		153 (503)	51	2023	Residential	Castlefield, Manchester	Part of the second phase of the Crown Street development area in the Southern end of Deansgate behind the Deansgate Square development. It was constructed before its sister building, Three60.
10	Elizabeth Tower		153 (501)	52	2022	Residential	Castlefield, Manchester	Part of the Great Jackson Street skyscraper cluster. Features a rooftop bar and a 44th floor swimming pool.
11	Cortland at Colliers Yard		153 (500)	50	2023	Residential	Greengate, Salford	The tallest building in Salford as of June 2026. The tallest tower in a collection of three towers.
12	Deansgate Square West Tower		144 (473)	44	2018	Residential	Castlefield, Manchester	The first completed development of the Deansgate Square collection of skyscrapers.
13	The Fernley		139 (456)	45	2024	Residential	Castlefield, Manchester	The tallest element of a development containing a total of over 2,200 co-living residential apartments.
14	Viadux Tower 1		139 (455)	40	2023	Residential	Central Business District, Manchester	A scheme built on top of a viaduct next to Beetham Tower.
15	Anaconda Cut		131 (431)	44	2018	Residential	Greengate, Salford	The second-tallest building in Salford as of June 2026.
16	Bankside at Colliers Yard		129 (423)	43	2024	Residential	Greengate, Salford	Third-tallest building in Salford and the second-tallest in a collection of three towers.
17	Deansgate Square North Tower		122 (399)	37	2019	Residential	Castlefield, Manchester	The final and shortest tower of the Deansgate Square collection of skyscrapers.
18	Crown View		119 (390)	37	2024	Residential	NOMA, Manchester	The tallest tower in the Victoria Riverside residential development and part of the £800 million NOMA development area.
19	CIS Tower		118 (387)	25	1962	Office	NOMA, Manchester	The UK's tallest building upon completion and as of June 2026 remains the tallest office building outside London.
20	uhaus		115 (378)	38	2020	Residential	Chorlton-on-Medlock, Manchester	The tallest building in Circle Square, an area of residential development within the Oxford Road corridor.
21	Union, Tower 1		112 (367)	36	2024	Residential	St John's, Manchester	A co-living residential development containing almost 400 apartments.
22=	Affinity Living Riverview		110 (361)	35	2021	Residential	Greengate, Salford	Fourth-tallest building in Salford on the banks of the River Irwell.
22=	Angel Gardens		110 (361)	36	2019	Residential	NOMA, Manchester	Located adjacent to the CIS Tower, it is one of the centrepieces of the £800 million NOMA development area.
24	Oxygen Tower 1		110 (359)	33	2021	Residential	Piccadilly, Manchester	The tallest tower in a development of the Piccadilly area on the eastern side of central Manchester.
25	X1 Michigan Tower 2		109 (358)	35	2026	Residential	Salford Quays, Salford	A development that consists of four towers within Salford Quays. Tower 1 at 41 storeys will become the tallest tower in the Quays. Tower 2, the second-tallest is the first to be constructed. Construction began in March 2024.
26	City Tower		107 (351)	30	1965	Office	Central Business District, Manchester	As of June 2026, it is the third-tallest office building outside London, after CIS Tower and 103 Colmore Row in Birmingham. Antenna spire height is 123 m (404 ft).
27	Embankment Exchange		107 (349)	35	2024	Residential	Greengate, Salford	Fifth-tallest building in Salford as of June 2026.
28	Bridgewater Heights		106 (348)	32	2012	Student accommodation	Oxford Road, Manchester	Upon completion, it was the tallest purpose-built student accommodation in the world.
29	Eda		101 (331)	29	2023	Residential	Salford Quays, Salford	Located in Anchorage Quay and containing 290 apartments.
30	One Port Street		100 (328)	33	2024	Residential	Piccadilly, Manchester	Part of a wider scheme in Piccadilly Basin in the south of central Manchester.
31	Swan Street Tower		98 (322)	34	2023	Residential	Ancoats, Manchester	A development in the northern gateway to central Manchester containing over 350 apartments.
32	Union, Tower 2		98 (321)	32	2023	Residential	St John's, Manchester	A co-living residential tower containing almost 400 apartments.
33	The Fairfax Tower 1		96 (315)	30	2025	Residential	Piccadilly, Manchester	A large development consisting of two towers delivering 488 apartments.
34	Artisan Heights		95 (312)	32	2020	Office / Student accommodation	Oxford Road, Manchester	An ultra modern tower at the top end of the Oxford Road corridor in central Manchester. The tower is the second-tallest student accommodation tower in Manchester.
35	Axis Tower		93 (305)	28	2018	Residential	Castlefield, Manchester	Located in the south-western area of central Manchester, next to Beetham Tower, was originally conceived as an office development but cancelled during the Great Recession in 2008. The project was reborn in 2012 as a residential tower incorporating a giant advertising screen.
36=	1 Spinningfields		92 (302)	20	2017	Office	Spinningfields, Manchester	The third-tallest office building in central Manchester after City Tower and the CIS Tower and the tallest building in Spinningfields.
36=	River Street Tower		92 (302)	32	2020	Student accommodation	Castlefield, Manchester	A development adjacent to Deansgate Square. The tower is the third-tallest student accommodation tower in Manchester.
38=	Arndale House		90 (295)	21	1979	Office	Central Business District, Manchester	Due to its location in the heart of central Manchester, above the Arndale shopping centre, Arndale House is a prominent building in the city. When completed in 1979 it was the third-tallest tower in the city after City Tower and the CIS Tower.
38=	Blue, MediaCityUK		90 (295)	18	2010	Office	Salford Quays, Salford	Part of MediaCityUK, the development of which is part of wider plans to transform Salford Quays into a major commerce and entertainment area of Greater Manchester.
38=	Furness Quay Tower 1		90 (295)	26	2020	Residential	Salford Quays, Salford	The tallest tower in a scheme in the heart of Salford Quays delivering over 750 apartments. Includes a smaller tower and the conversion of Furness House and Custom House, two 1970s office buildings.
41	New Victoria Tower 1		89 (292)	25	2022	Residential	Central Business District, Manchester	A large office and residential scheme located by Victoria station in the northern side of central Manchester.
42	One Greengate Block A		88 (289)	31	2016	Residential	Greengate, Salford	The second-tallest development within Greengate when constructed.
43	Manchester Town Hall Clock Tower		87 (285)	N/A	1877	Government	Central Business District, Manchester	The tallest building in Manchester for 85 years from 1877 until the CIS Tower was completed in 1962. It remains a prominent focal point in the city.
44	TheHeart, MediaCityUK		86 (282)	22	2010	Hotel	Salford Quays, Salford	The second-tallest hotel in Manchester after the Hilton Hotel situated in the Beetham Tower. Part of MediaCityUK.
45=	X1 Media City Tower 1		85 (277)	26	2017	Residential	Salford Quays, Salford	Consists of four identical residential towers. Part of MediaCityUK. Three buildings have been completed and one is under construction as of June 2026.
45=	X1 Media City Tower 2		85 (277)	26	2019	Residential	Salford Quays, Salford	Consists of four identical residential towers. Part of MediaCityUK. Three buildings have been completed and one is under construction as of June 2026.
45=	X1 Media City Tower 3		85 (277)	26	2023	Residential	Salford Quays, Salford	Consists of four identical residential towers. Part of MediaCityUK. Three buildings have been completed and one is under construction as of June 2026.
48	Cambridge Street Block A		83 (272)	26	2016	Residential	Oxford Street, Manchester	The tallest of a collection of prominent residential buildings in the Oxford Road area of the city, close to the Bridgewater Heights development.
49=	One Regent		82 (269)	28	2016	Residential	Castlefield, Manchester	A residential development in the western part of central Manchester.
49=	Acer Tower		82 (269)	26	2024	Residential	Southern Gateway	A residential development containing a total of over 2,200 co-living residential apartments. The tower contains 716 dwellings.
51=	Civil Justice Centre		81 (266)	18	2007	Government	Spinningfields, Manchester	A prominent tower and the second-tallest building in the Spinningfields district of central Manchester.
51=	Waterhouse Gardens - Irwell House		81 (266)	26	2025	Residential	Cheetham Hill	A large development of five towers in the north of central Manchester. The scheme features 556 apartments, duplexes and penthouses.
53	North Tower		80 (262)	25	1966	Hotel	Greengate, Salford	A prominent building in Greengate due to its elevated position and the third-tallest hotel in Greater Manchester.
54=	The Castings, Heyrod Street		78 (256)	25	2024	Residential	New Islington, Manchester	A residential tower containing 352 apartments. It lies in Piccadilly as part of the Portugal Street East regeneration area.
54=	Victoria House, Great Ancoats Street		78 (256)	25	2023	Residential	Ancoats, Manchester	A residential tower containing 177 apartments.
56=	Manchester One		77 (253)	21	1962	Office	Piccadilly, Manchester	The second-tallest office building in central Manchester upon its completion, formerly known as the Portland Tower, is still a prominent building in the Piccadilly Gardens area of the city.
56=	Park View		77 (253)	26	2024	Residential	NOMA, Manchester	The second-tallest tower in the Victoria Riverside residential development and part of the £800 million NOMA development area.
58	1 Circle Square		76 (249)	18	2020	Residential	Chorlton-on-Medlock, Manchester	The second-tallest building in the Circle Square development within the Oxford Road corridor in central Manchester.
59=	Salford Shopping Centre		75 (246)	25	1970	Residential	Pendleton, Salford	Upon completion was one of the tallest buildings in Greater Manchester and remains the tallest building in the suburb of Pendleton, 2 miles (3.2 km) west of central Manchester.
59=	3 Hardman Street		75 (246)	18	2009	Office	Spinningfields, Manchester	The third-tallest building in the Spinningfields district of central Manchester.
61=	Church of St Mary		74 (241)	N/A	1858	Place of worship	Hulme, Manchester	The tallest building in the city of Manchester when it was completed in 1858 for six years until the Manchester Assize Courts were constructed in 1864.
61=	NumberOne, MediaCityUK		74 (241)	22	2010	Residential	Salford Quays, Salford	Part of MediaCityUK.
63=	Salford Cathedral		73 (240)	N/A	1848	Place of worship	Blackfriars, Salford	Was the tallest building in Greater Manchester upon its completion in 1848. A prominent building on the East Lancashire Road approaching central Manchester.
63=	HMP Manchester Tower		73 (240)	N/A	1869	Prison	Strangeways, Manchester	The third-tallest structure in Greater Manchester when completed in 1869, remains a recognisable part of the skyline due to the imposing design of its ventilation tower.
63=	Heaton Park BT Tower		73 (240)	N/A	1966	Telecommunication	Blackley, Manchester	Built on the bank of Heaton Park reservoir within the largest park in Manchester, in conjunction with a number of other telecommunication towers throughout the UK as part of operation Backbone.
63=	Novella Tower 1		73 (240)	23	2022	Residential	Greengate, Salford	Located between Trinity Way and the River Irwell, features 211 apartments.
63=	New Victoria Tower 2		73 (240)	20	2022	Residential	Central Business District, Manchester	A large office and residential scheme located by Victoria train station in the northern side of central Manchester.
63=	Novella Tower 2		73 (240)	23	2025	Residential	Greengate, Salford	A twin tower scheme consisting of 375 apartments.
69=	St George's Church, Heaviley		72 (236)	N/A	1897	Place of worship	Stockport	An active Anglican parish church and remains the tallest structure constructed in the borough of Stockport, 4 miles (6.4 km) southeast of central Manchester.
69=	Great Northern Tower		72 (236)	25	2006	Residential	Central Business District, Manchester	Features a sloped roof design to complement the curved roof of the nearby Manchester Central Convention Complex and create a distinctive silhouette.
69=	One Angel Square		72 (236)	15	2012	Office	NOMA, Manchester	A distinctive design and one of the most sustainable buildings in Europe. Located adjacent to the CIS Tower, it is one of the centrepieces of the £800 million NOMA development area.
69=	3 St Peter's Square	Three St Peter's Square building from the outside	72 (236)	20	2020	Hotel	Central Business District, Manchester	A hotel development consisting of both Motel One and StayCity hotel chains. It forms part of a new civic space for St Peter's Square in the heart of central Manchester.
69=	The Fairfax Tower 2		72 (236)	23	2025	Residential	Piccadilly, Manchester	A large residential development in Piccadilly consisting of two towers delivering 488 apartments.
74	Square Gardens, First Street South Tower 4		71 (233)	22	2024	Residential	Castlefield, Manchester	Part of a development containing over 2,200 co-living residential apartments.
75=	City of Manchester Stadium		70 (230)	N/A	2002	Stadium	Bradford, Manchester	Originally conceived as part of Manchester's bid for the 2000 summer Olympics, the City of Manchester stadium was built to host the 2002 Commonwealth Games. With a capacity of 60,000, it is one of the largest stadiums in the UK and hosts numerous international events.
75=	Jefferson Place		70 (230)	21	2007	Residential	Green Quarter, Manchester	The tallest building in the Green Quarter in the northern gateway to central Manchester, it is a large residential complex.
75=	Oldfield Wharf Tower 1		70 (230)	23	2024	Residential	Ordsall, Salford	A residential development located in Ordsall close to the University of Salford.
78=	Chapel Wharf, Doodson House		69 (226)	23	2018	Residential	Greengate, Salford	A residential development in the Greengate area of Salford on the banks of the River Irwell. Part of a larger development consisting of four towers, Chapel Wharf development is home to 995 apartments.
78=	Church Street Place		69 (226) (estimate)	23	2024	Residential	Eccles, Salford	A residential building containing 270 apartments.
80=	White, Media City		68 (223)	15	2010	Office	Salford Quays, Salford	Part of MediaCityUK and includes the Holiday Inn Manchester hotel.
80=	Wilburn Wharf Tower 1		68 (223)	21	2017	Residential	Ordsall, Salford	The tallest of four distinct tower blocks in Wilburn Basin.
80=	Local Crescent, Block B		68 (223)	21	2020	Residential	Ordsall, Salford	The tallest tower in a collection of three residential towers in Ordsall close to the University of Salford.
80=	The Gate, Angel Meadow		68 (223)	22	2021	Residential	NOMA, Manchester	The second-tallest tower in the Angel Meadow development adjacent to NOMA, an £800 million NOMA development area. It was constructed along with its sister tower, The Stile.
84=	Millennium Tower		67 (220)	21	2008	Residential	Salford Quays, Salford	A residential development in Salford Quays. Part of MediaCityUK.
84=	The Light House		67 (220)	19	2008	Residential	Northern Quarter, Manchester	The tallest building within Manchester's historical Northern Quarter, originally made up of three individual buildings and refurbished into one apartment complex.
84=	Lightbox, Media City		67 (220)	19	2019	Residential	Salford Quays, Salford	Part of MediaCityUK with its sister building Green Rooms.
84=	Green Rooms, Media City		67 (220)	19	2019	Residential	Salford Quays, Salford	Part of MediaCityUK with its sister building Green Rooms.
84=	Victoria Residence		67 (220)	21	2020	Residential	Castlefield, Manchester	Part of a skyscraper development with its sister building, Elizabeth Tower.
89=	Kimpton Clocktower Hotel		66 (217)	N/A	1912	Hotel	Oxford Road, Manchester	Built in two phases, it was originally an open business hall. The second phase of construction added a 66 m (217 ft) clock tower. The building was converted to a hotel in 1996 and now has Grade II listed status.
89=	Stretford House		66 (217)	25	1968	Residential	Stretford, Trafford	The tallest tower in the suburb of Stretford, located on Chester Road.
89=	Spruce Court		66 (217)	23	1969	Residential	Pendleton, Salford	Some of the tallest towers in Greater Manchester when constructed in the 1960s.
89=	Thorn Court		66 (217)	23	1969	Residential	Pendleton, Salford	Some of the tallest towers in Greater Manchester when constructed in the 1960s.
89=	Bronte Court		66 (217)	23	1970	Residential	Pendleton, Salford	Some of the tallest towers in Greater Manchester when constructed in the 1960s.
89=	Churchill Court		66 (217)	23	1970	Residential	Pendleton, Salford	Some of the tallest towers in Greater Manchester when constructed in the 1960s.
89=	Fitzwarren Court		66 (217)	23	1970	Residential	Pendleton, Salford	Some of the tallest towers in Greater Manchester when constructed in the 1960s.
89=	Sovereign Point		66 (217)	20	2005	Residential	Salford Quays, Salford	The tallest building in Salford Quays at the time of its construction. Part of MediaCityUK.
89=	The Filaments Tower 1		66 (216)	22	2020	Residential	Greengate, Salford	The tallest tower in a collection of three residential towers in the Greengate area of Salford.
98=	Victoria Mill		65 (213)	N/A	1873	Office / Residential	Miles Platting, Manchester	The tallest mill ever constructed in Greater Manchester. Located in Miles Platting, less than 2 miles (3.2 km) to the North East of central Manchester.
98=	Imperial Point At The Lowry		65 (213)	16	2001	Residential	Salford Quays, Salford	The tallest building in Salford Quays when constructed. Part of MediaCityUK.
98=	Britton House		65 (213)	21	2009	Residential	Green Quarter, Manchester	Located in the Green Quarter in the northern gateway to central Manchester.
98=	Cypress Place		65 (213)	20	2013	Residential	Green Quarter, Manchester	Located in the Green Quarter in the northern gateway to central Manchester.
102=	Albert Bridge House		64 (210)	18	1959	Office	Spinningfields, Manchester	The tallest office building in the city when constructed.
102=	111 Piccadilly		64 (210)	18	1965	Office	Piccadilly, Manchester	The fifth-tallest office building in the city when constructed.
102=	Dunkirk Rise		64 (210)	21	1966	Residential	Rochdale	The tallest towers in Rochdale, a northeast borough of Greater Manchester. They were constructed in the 1960s residential tower boom.
102=	Mitchell Hey		64 (210)	21	1966	Residential	Rochdale	The tallest towers in Rochdale, a northeast borough of Greater Manchester. They were constructed in the 1960s residential tower boom.
102=	Tentercroft		64 (210)	21	1966	Residential	Rochdale	The tallest towers in Rochdale, a northeast borough of Greater Manchester. They were constructed in the 1960s residential tower boom.
102=	Town Mill Brow		64 (210)	21	1966	Residential	Rochdale	The tallest towers in Rochdale, a northeast borough of Greater Manchester. They were constructed in the 1960s residential tower boom.
102=	Tempus Tower		64 (210)	20	2006	Residential	Green Quarter, Manchester	One of a number of high-rise residential buildings constructed in the Northern Gateway to central Manchester to cater for significant rising populations in the city.
102=	Islington Wharf		64 (210)	21	2008	Residential	New Islington, Manchester	The tallest building in the New Islington area of central Manchester when constructed.
102=	One Greengate Block D		64 (210)	21	2016	Residential	Greengate, Salford	The third-tallest development within the Greengate area of Salford when constructed.
102=	The Slate Yard Flint Building		64 (210)	21	2020	Residential	New Bailey, Salford	The tallest tower in a collection of three residential towers in the New Bailey area of central Manchester.
112=	Skyline Central		63 (207)	20	2007	Office / Residential	NOMA, Manchester	The fourth-tallest building and second-tallest residential building in the £800 million NOMA development area when constructed.
112=	The Peninsula		63 (207)	12	2009	Office	Green Quarter, Manchester	A prominent office block constructed in the Green Quarter of central Manchester.
112=	Cambridge Street Block B		63 (207)	21	2016	Residential	Oxford Road, Manchester	The second-tallest of a collection of prominent residential buildings in the Oxford Road area of the city, close to the Bridgewater Heights development.
115=	No. 1 Deansgate		62 (203)	17	2002	Residential	Central Business District, Manchester	The tallest all-steel residential building in the UK and one of the most expensive addresses in Manchester.
115=	X1 The Gateway		62 (203)	21	2020	Residential	Salford Quays, Salford	The tower topped out in late 2018, however, soon after construction stalled with final completion running into 2020.
117=	Old Trafford Football Stadium		61 (200)	N/A	1909	Stadium	Old Trafford, Trafford	Located 2 miles (3.2 km) south west of central Manchester, Old Trafford football stadium is the biggest club stadium in the UK, the second-biggest football stadium in the UK after Wembley and the 11th-largest in Europe.
117=	Hanover Towers		61 (200)	22	1969	Residential	Stockport	The second-tallest buildings in the borough of Stockport.
117=	Pendlebury Towers		61 (200)	22	1969	Residential	Stockport	The second-tallest buildings in the borough of Stockport.
117=	City Lofts		61 (200)	21	2007	Residential	Salford Quays, Salford	The third-tallest building in Salford Quays when constructed. Part of MediaCityUK.
117=	Brooklyn Hotel		61 (200)	16	2019	Hotel	Piccadilly, Manchester	A period style hotel and the fifth-largest hotel in central Manchester.
117=	One Castle Wharf		61 (200)	21	2020	Residential	Cornbrook, Manchester	The larger tower in a residential development on Chester Road in the southern gateway to central Manchester.
117=	Eden		61 (200)	15	2023	Office	New Bailey, Salford	An office development in the New Bailey area of central Manchester.
117=	3 Circle Square		61 (200)	15	2024	Office	Chorlton-on-Medlock, Manchester	A major area of residential development within the Oxford Road corridor in central Manchester where the former offices of BBC Manchester stood.
125=	St James' Buildings		60 (197)	9	1912	Office	Oxford Road, Manchester	An Edwardian style high-rise in central Manchester. Initially constructed to house textile companies and merchants during the Industrial Revolution, has since been converted into housing modern office space.
125=	Charter House		60 (197)	21	1967	Residential	Eccles, Salford	The tallest building in the suburb of Eccles, 5 miles (8.0 km) west of central Manchester.
125=	5 Exchange Quay		60 (197)	20	1997	Office	Salford Quays, Salford	The tallest building in Salford Quays when constructed. Part of MediaCityUK.
125=	The Edge (B)		60 (197)	18	2004	Office / Residential	Greengate, Salford	When constructed, the tallest buildings in the Greengate area of Salford.
125=	The Edge (C)		60 (197)	18	2004	Office / Residential	Greengate, Salford	When constructed, the tallest buildings in the Greengate area of Salford.
125=	2 Leftbank Apartments		60 (197)	16	2005	Residential	Spinningfields, Manchester	Twin buildings built on the edge of the Spinningfields area of central Manchester bordering the City of Salford on the River Irwell.
125=	3 Leftbank Apartments		60 (197)	16	2005	Residential	Spinningfields, Manchester	Twin buildings built on the edge of the Spinningfields area of central Manchester bordering the City of Salford on the River Irwell.
125=	3 Piccadilly Place		60 (197)	13	2007	Office	Piccadilly, Manchester	One of the tallest buildings in the Piccadilly area of central Manchester, a modern office development located next to Piccadilly station.
125=	Chancery Place		60 (197)	15	2008	Office	Central Business District, Manchester	Inspired by the Flatiron Building in New York City, a modern office building in the heart of central Manchester. Completed in 2008, Chancery Place was refurbished in 2019.
125=	Manchester Airport Control Tower		60 (196)	N/A	2013	Control Tower	Ringway, Manchester	Completed in 2013 to coincide with the 75th anniversary of Manchester Airport, Manchester Airport Control Tower is the second-tallest control tower in the UK after Heathrow Airport.
125=	The Lume		60 (196)	19	2018	Hotel / Residential	Chorlton-on-Medlock, Manchester	A modern co-branded hotel built in the Oxford Road corridor of central Manchester, near to the University of Manchester.
125=	Duet, Erie Basin Tower 1		60 (197)	15	2019	Residential	Salford Quays, Salford	The twin towers of Erie Basin are part of MediaCityUK.
125=	Duet, Erie Basin Tower 2		60 (197)	15	2019	Residential	Salford Quays, Salford	The twin towers of Erie Basin are part of MediaCityUK.
125=	Vita Living Circle Square Tower 2		60 (197)	18	2021	Residential	Chorlton-on-Medlock, Manchester	The third-tallest building in the Circle Square development within the Oxford Road corridor in central Manchester.
139=	One St Peter's Square		59 (194)	14	2014	Office	Central Business District, Manchester	Modern office blocks forming part of a new civic space for St Peter's Square in the heart of central Manchester.
139=	Two St Peter's Square		59 (194)	12	2017	Office	Central Business District, Manchester	Modern office blocks forming part of a new civic space for St Peter's Square in the heart of central Manchester.
139=	Landmark, St Peter's Square		59 (194)	14	2019	Office	Central Business District, Manchester	Modern office blocks forming part of a new civic space for St Peter's Square in the heart of central Manchester.
139=	2 Circle Square		59 (194)	14	2020	Office	Chorlton-on-Medlock, Manchester	The joint fourth-tallest building in the Circle Square development within the Oxford Road corridor in central Manchester.
139=	Hotel and MSCP (multi-storey car park), Circle Square		59 (194)	18	2021	Hotel	Chorlton-on-Medlock, Manchester	The joint fourth-tallest building in the Circle Square development within the Oxford Road corridor in central Manchester.
144=	Rochdale Town Hall		58 (190)	N/A	1890	Government	Rochdale	The tallest building in Rochdale when completed, a Grade I listed building built in a Gothic Revival style.
144=	Lowry House		58 (190)	15	1973	Office	Central Business District, Manchester	The fifth-tallest office tower in Manchester when completed, located in Manchester's central business district.
144=	Orange, MediaCityUK		58 (190)	9	2010	Office	Salford Quays, Salford	Part of MediaCityUK.
144=	Fifty5ive		58 (190)	19	2022	Residential	Greengate, Salford	A residential development in the Greengate area of Salford.
144=	Glassworks		58 (190)	17	2023	Residential	Northern Quarter, Manchester	A development located in the Northern Quarter area of central Manchester.
149=	Minshull Street Courts		57 (188)	N/A	1871	Government	Central Business District, Manchester	The fourth-tallest structure in Greater Manchester when completed in 1871, a Grade II listed Gothic tower. The building was substantially modernised and expanded in 1996.
149=	UNITE Tower		57 (188)	19	2007	Student accommodation	Piccadilly, Manchester	Situated in the Piccadilly area of the city, the second-tallest student accommodation building in Greater Manchester.
149=	1 Old Trafford Tower 1		57 (187)	18	2020	Residential	Old Trafford, Trafford	The tallest of two towers adjacent to Old Trafford football stadium. The scheme is home to 350 apartments.
149=	Affinity Living Riverside		57 (187)	17	2020	Residential	Greengate, Salford	The smaller tower in a major residential construction on the banks of the River Irwell in the Greengate area of Salford.
149=	Cornbrook Works Tower 1		57 (187) (estimate)	19	2020	Residential	Cornbrook, Manchester	The larger tower in a residential development in Cornbrook, in the southern gateway to central Manchester.
154=	Church of the Holy Name of Jesus		56 (184)	N/A	1928	Place of worship	Chorlton-on-Medlock, Manchester	A Grade I listed building. The church was closed in 1985 due to dwindling numbers before being reopened in 2012.
154=	Treehouse Hotel		56 (184)	15	1972	Hotel	Central Business District, Manchester	Located at the northern end of Deansgate on the banks of the River Irwell.
154=	Parkway Gate Block 1		56 (184)	18	2008	Student accommodation	Chorlton-on-Medlock, Manchester	Located near the university area of central Manchester, the third-tallest purpose-built student accommodation building in Greater Manchester.
154=	Oldfield Wharf Tower 2		56 (184)	18	2018	Residential	Ordsall, Salford	A residential development located in Ordsall close to the University of Salford. The second-tallest in a collection of four towers.
154=	Furness Quay Tower 4		56 (184)	17	2020	Residential	Salford Quays, Salford	The fourth-tallest tower in a scheme in the heart of Salford Quays delivering over 750 apartments.
154=	Silkbank Wharf		56 (184)	17	2023	Residential	Ordsall, Salford	A residential development located on Derwent Street near Regent Road in the western gateway to central Manchester.
160=	St Peter's Church		55 (180)	N/A	1871	Place of worship	Bolton	Constructed in 1871, remains the tallest structure in the borough of Bolton, 7 miles (11 km) northwest of central Manchester. A Grade II listed building.
160=	Peel House		55 (180)	16	1896	University	Ordsall, Salford	When constructed in 1896, one of the tallest buildings in Greater Manchester and remains the largest university building in Greater Manchester.
160=	Royal Exchange Theatre		55 (180)	8	1922	Theatre	Central Business District, Manchester	A classical style structure in the central business district of Manchester. The 10th-tallest structure in Greater Manchester when constructed, today it is a modern theatre and a Grade II listed building.
160=	St James's House		55 (180)	17	1964	Office	Central Business District, Manchester	The third-tallest office tower in Greater Manchester when completed, a prominent development in the central business district of Manchester.
160=	Bank Chambers		55 (180)	13	1971	Office	Central Business District, Manchester	Originally constructed as a bullion bank vault by the Bank of England, is now an office block in the central business district of Manchester.
160=	Imperial War Museum North		55 (180)	N/A	2002	Museum	Trafford Park, Trafford	The first branch of the Imperial War Museum to be located in the north of England. The museum occupies a site overlooking the Manchester Ship Canal in Trafford Park, an area which during the Second World War was a key industrial centre and consequently heavily bombed during the Manchester Blitz in 1940.
160=	NV Building 1		55 (180)	18	2004	Residential	Salford Quays, Salford	A collection of residential apartment blocks. They area part of MediaCityUK.
160=	NV Building 2		55 (180)	18	2004	Residential	Salford Quays, Salford	A collection of residential apartment blocks. They area part of MediaCityUK.
160=	NV Building 3		55 (180)	18	2004	Residential	Salford Quays, Salford	A collection of residential apartment blocks. They area part of MediaCityUK.
160=	1 New York Street		55 (180)	13	2009	Office	Central Business District, Manchester	Completed in 2009, a commercial office development in the central business district of Manchester. It is the first speculative building in central Manchester to be awarded a BREEAM 'Excellent' rating.
160=	ALTO Block D		55 (180)	17	2015	Residential	Greengate, Salford	Located in the Greengate area of Salford, the tallest building in a complex consisting of four residential buildings.
171=	Vita Living Circle Square Tower 1		54 (177)	18	2017	Student accommodation	Chorlton-on-Medlock, Manchester	The fourth-tallest student accommodation building in Greater Manchester.
171=	City Suites, Chapel Street		54 (177)	17	2017	Hotel	Greengate, Salford	An ApartHotel construction. It is located in the Greengate area of Salford.
171=	Local Blackfriars Tower 1		54 (177)	17	2019	Residential	Greengate, Salford	A residential scheme consisting of nearly 400 apartments. It is located in the Greengate area of Salford.
171=	Kampus, North Block		54 (177)	16	2020	Residential	Piccadilly, Manchester	A residential scheme located in the Piccadilly area of central Manchester. Built on the old Aytoun Street campus of Manchester Metropolitan University, Kampus contains 585 apartments within five towers.
171=	Kampus, South Block		54 (177)	16	2020	Residential	Piccadilly, Manchester	A residential scheme located in the Piccadilly area of central Manchester. Built on the old Aytoun Street campus of Manchester Metropolitan University, Kampus contains 585 apartments within five towers.
171=	Vita Living Circle Square Tower 3		54 (177)	17	2021	Residential	Chorlton-on-Medlock, Manchester	The sixth-tallest building in the Circle Square development within the Oxford Road corridor in central Manchester.
171=	Affinity Living Embankment West, Exchange Point		54 (177) (estimate)	18	2021	Residential	Greengate, Salford	The tallest in a collection of three towers in the Greengate area of Salford. The scheme is home to 350 apartments.
171=	Embankment West, Laurence Place		54 (177) (estimate)	18	2021	Residential	Greengate, Salford	The tallest in a collection of three towers in the Greengate area of Salford. The scheme is home to 350 apartments.
171=	High Definition, Broadway Square		54 (177)	17	2023	Residential	Salford Quays, Salford	A residential tower. Part of MediaCityUK.
180=	Civic Centre		53 (174)	14	1977	Government / Office	Oldham	Completed in 1977, remains the tallest building in the borough of Oldham, 5 miles (8.0 km) north east of central Manchester and remains the administrative home of the local council.
180=	No. 1 Marsden Street		53 (174)	12	2002	Office	Central Business District, Manchester	A modernist office tower constructed in the central business district of Manchester.
180=	Chapel Wharf, Alcock House		53 (174)	18	2018	Residential	Greengate, Salford	A residential development in the Greengate area of Salford on the banks of the River Irwell.
180=	Local Crescent, Block A		53 (174)	16	2020	Residential	Ordsall, Salford	The second-tallest tower in a collection of three residential towers in Ordsall close to the University of Salford.
180=	The Stile, Angel Meadow		53 (174)	17	2021	Residential	NOMA, Manchester	The shortest tower in the Angel Meadow development adjacent to NOMA, an £800 million NOMA development are. Was constructed along with its sister tower, The Gate.
180=	Maldron Hotel, Charles Street		53 (174)	17	2022	Hotel	Oxford Road, Manchester	A hotel construction located in the Oxford Road area of central Manchester containing 278 hotel rooms.
180=	Maldron Hotel, Chapel Street		53 (174)	16	2023	Hotel	New Bailey, Salford	A hotel construction located in the New Bailey area of central Manchester. It contains 278 hotel rooms.
180=	City View		53 (174)	18	2024	Residential	NOMA, Manchester	The third-tallest tower in the Victoria Riverside residential development and part of the £800 million NOMA development area.
188=	Holland Rise		52 (171)	18	1965	Residential	Rochdale	The tallest towers in the borough of Rochdale when constructed in the 1960s residential tower boom.
188=	Mardyke		52 (171)	18	1965	Residential	Rochdale	The tallest towers in the borough of Rochdale when constructed in the 1960s residential tower boom.
188=	Underwood		52 (171)	18	1965	Residential	Rochdale	The tallest towers in the borough of Rochdale when constructed in the 1960s residential tower boom.
188=	West Point		52 (171)	16	1975	Student accommodation	Stretford, Trafford	The second-tallest building in the suburb of Stretford, originally constructed for office space but was converted in 2018 to student accommodation.
188=	82 King Street		52 (171)	13	1995	Office	Central Business District, Manchester	A modernist office tower constructed in the central business district of Manchester.
188=	Vallea Court		52 (171)	16	2009	Residential	Green Quarter, Manchester	Located in the Green Quarter in the northern gateway to central Manchester, a large residential complex.
188=	Oxygen Tower 2		52 (171)	16	2021	Residential	Piccadilly, Manchester	The smaller tower in a development of the Piccadilly area on the eastern side of central Manchester.
188=	True Student, Discovery Quay Tower 1		52 (171)	15	2022	Student accommodation	Salford Quays, Salford	Part of MediaCityUK.
188=	House of Social, First Street		52 (171)	15	2025	Student accommodation	Southern Gateway	A student accommodation development in the First Street area of central Manchester.
197=	Vox Tower 1		51 (167)	15	2020	Hotel / Residential	Cornbrook, Manchester	The larger tower in a hotel and residential development in Cornbrook, in the southern gateway to central Manchester.
197=	Kampus, The Stack		51 (167)	15	2020	Residential	Piccadilly, Manchester	Kampus is a residential scheme located in the Piccadilly area of central Manchester. Built on the old Aytoun Street campus of Manchester Metropolitan University, Kampus contains 585 apartments within five towers.
197=	2 New Bailey Square		51 (167)	11	2021	Office	Greengate, Salford	A prominent office development in the Greengate area of Salford.
197=	Ancoats Gardens Tower 1		51 (167)	15	2022	Residential	Ancoats, Manchester	The largest tower in a wider residential development in the Ancoats area of central Manchester delivering 150 apartments.
197=	Urban Green, Seymour Grove		51 (167)	17	2023	Residential	Old Trafford, Trafford	A residential build in the Old Trafford area of Manchester.
197=	4 New Bailey		51 (167)	11	2023	Office	New Bailey, Salford	An office development in the New Bailey area of central Manchester.
203=	Lincoln Towers		50 (164)	16	1965	Residential	Stockport	The second-tallest towers in the borough of Stockport when constructed in the 1960s residential tower boom.
203=	Millbrook Towers		50 (164)	16	1965	Residential	Stockport	The second-tallest towers in the borough of Stockport when constructed in the 1960s residential tower boom.
203=	Mottram Towers		50 (164)	16	1965	Residential	Stockport	The second-tallest towers in the borough of Stockport when constructed in the 1960s residential tower boom.
203=	Ratcliffe Towers		50 (164)	16	1965	Residential	Stockport	The second-tallest towers in the borough of Stockport when constructed in the 1960s residential tower boom.
203=	Hollywood Towers		50 (164)	16	1969	Residential	Stockport	The joint fourth-tallest tower in the borough of Stockport. It was constructed in the 1960s residential tower boom.
203=	Nine Acre Court		50 (164)	18	1972	Residential	Ordsall, Salford	A residential tower constructed in Ordsall, 2 km (1.2 mi) west of central Manchester.
203=	Hexagon Tower		50 (164)	12	1975	Office	Crumpsall, Manchester	A specialist science and technology facility. Currently the tallest building in the suburb of Crumpsall, 3 mi (4.8 km) north of central Manchester.
203=	Parkway Gate Block 2		50 (164)	16	2008	Student accommodation	Chorlton-on-Medlock, Manchester	Located near the university area of central Manchester, the sixth-tallest purpose-built student accommodation building in Greater Manchester.
203=	Chapel Wharf, Chapman House		50 (164)	17	2018	Residential	Greengate, Salford	A residential development in the Greengate area of Salford on the banks of the River Irwell.
203=	X1 Manchester Waters Tower 3		50 (164)	14	2020	Residential	Trafford Park, Trafford	The shortest in a collection of three towers in a residential development in Pomona Docks in Trafford Park.
203=	4 Angel Square		50 (164)	11	2022	Office	NOMA, Manchester	An office development located adjacent to the CIS Tower.
203=	Leonardo Hotel		50 (164)	14	2022	Hotel	New Islington, Manchester	A modernist hotel development in New Islington in the eastern side of central Manchester containing 275 hotel rooms.

== Tallest under construction or approved ==
=== Tallest under construction ===
There are 27 buildings under construction in Greater Manchester and are planned to rise at least 50 metres (160 ft). Buildings appear on this list when each project reaches the stage of a piling rig being used on site. Buildings under construction that have been topped out and are externally complete are listed above and are classed as completed.

Rank	Name	Image	Estimated height m (ft)	Floors	Estimated year of completion	Usage	Location	Notes
1	Nobu Hotel & Residences - Viadux 2 Tower 1		246 (807)	76	2031	Hotel / Residential	Central Business District, Manchester	The second-tallest proposed tower in Greater Manchester. The tower will feature the luxury Nobu hotel chain and is set to become the fourth-tallest in the UK. Approved in April 2025. Construction began in November 2025.
2	St Michael's - W Hotel & Residences		144 (472)	44	2027	Hotel / Residential	Central Business District, Manchester	A major scheme in the historic Civic Quarter of Manchester. Spread across two towers, the smaller office block features a rooftop restaurant, whilst the larger tower features apartments and a 5-star hotel under the W brand. Construction began in March 2024.
3	Parkside at Colliers Yard		123 (403)	42	2028	Residential	Greengate, Salford	A 516-suite residential tower located in the modern Greengate skyscraper development area. Approved in March 2023. Construction began in October 2025.
4	Trinity Islands Plot C Tower 2		119 (390)	39	2029	Residential	Castlefield, Manchester	A two-tower development due to be constructed after the completion of Vista River Gardens and Trinity Heights. In total, these four towers deliver 1,950 apartments on the western edge of Castlefield. Approved in February 2022. Construction began in May 2026.
5	One Medlock Street Tower 1		117 (384)	39	2028	Student accommodation	Southern Gateway	The scheme consists of two towers. Tower 1 is a 39-storey purpose-built student accommodation tower while Tower 2 is a 14-storey office tower with a corten steel facade. Construction began in August 2025.
6	Red Bank Riverside Tower 1		111 (364)	34	2028	Residential	Red Bank, Manchester	Following on from Victoria Riverside which completed in 2024, Red Bank Riverside is the next phase of the wider Victoria North masterplan - a large new neighbourhood in the north side of central Manchester. Construction began in August 2025.
7	Vita Student		95 (313)	33	2028	Student accommodation	Southern Gateway	Formed of two towers with 12 storeys and 33 storeys, the development contains 861 rooms in total, along with social spaces and three gyms.
8	Red Bank Riverside - Kingfisher		92 (302)	31	2028	Residential	Red Bank, Manchester	Following on from Victoria Riverside which completed in 2024, Red Bank Riverside is the next phase of the wider Victoria North masterplan - a large new neighbourhood in the north side of central Manchester. Construction began in August 2025.
9	Fusion		91 (298)	28	2026	Student accommodation	Castlefield, Manchester	Inspired by the Flatiron in New York, a purpose-built student accommodation building adjacent to the New Jackson skyscraper district containing over 500 rooms. Construction began in February 2024.
10	Brewery Gardens Tower 1		91 (298)	30	2027	Residential	Cheetham Hill, Manchester	A collection of four towers developed as a regeneration of the former Boddingtons Brewery site. The towers contain 556 apartments as well as 3,700 m^{2} (40,000 sq ft) of commercial space and an open-air cinema. Construction began in September 2023.
11	IQ, Echo Street Tower 1		89 (292)	29	2025	Student accommodation	Piccadilly, Manchester	A collection of three co-living student accommodation towers in the Piccadilly area containing 1,224 rooms and all-inclusive amenities.
12	Red Bank Riverside Tower 3		87 (285)	27	2028	Residential	Red Bank, Manchester	Following on from Victoria Riverside which completed in 2024, Red Bank Riverside is the next phase of the wider Victoria North masterplan - a large new neighbourhood in the north side of central Manchester. Construction began in August 2025.
13	X1 Media City Tower 4		86 (282)	26	2027	Residential	Salford Quays, Salford	The development consists of four identical residential towers and containing 1,100 apartments in total. Residents amenities include a private cinema and gym.
14	Brewery Gardens Tower 2		81 (266)	26	2027	Residential	Cheetham Hill, Manchester	A collection of four towers developed as a regeneration of the former Boddingtons Brewery site. The towers contain 556 apartments as well as 3,700 m^{2} (40,000 sq ft) of commercial space and an open-air cinema. Construction began in September 2023.
15=	Regent Plaza Block A		80 (262)	26	2029	Residential	Ordsall, Salford	A five-tower complex development on Regent Road in Salford that contains 525 apartments. As of 2025 two of the smallest blocks have been completed, however the remaining development appears to have stalled.
15=	Obsidian		80 (262)	27	2026	Residential	Greengate, Salford	A large residential development on Trinity Way featuring 250 apartments.
17	Red Bank Riverside Tower 4		78 (256)	24	2028	Residential	Red Bank, Manchester	Following on from Victoria Riverside which completed in 2024, Red Bank Riverside is the next phase of the wider Victoria North masterplan - a large new neighbourhood in the north side of central Manchester. Construction began in August 2025.
18	Hampton by Hilton, Deansgate		73 (239)	22	2025	Hotel	Castlefield, Manchester	An aparthotel which cantilevers above Deansgate Viaduct, providing 357 hotel rooms and guest facilities.
19	IQ, Echo Street Tower 2		71 (233)	23	2025	Student accommodation	Piccadilly, Manchester	A collection of three co-living student accommodation towers in the Piccadilly area containing 1,224 rooms and all-inclusive amenities.
20=	Motto Hotel, Laystall Street		65 (213)	20	2028	Hotel	Ancoats, Manchester	A 154-bedroom hotel which includes a gym, bar and a restaurant.
20=	Red Bank Riverside - Falcon		65 (213)	22	2028	Residential	Red Bank, Manchester	Following on from Victoria Riverside which completed in 2024, Red Bank Riverside is the next phase of the wider Victoria North masterplan - a large new neighbourhood in the north side of central Manchester. Construction began in August 2025.
22=	Brewery Gardens Tower 3		64 (210)	21	2027	Residential	Cheetham Hill, Manchester	A collection of four towers developed as a regeneration of the former Boddingtons Brewery site. The towers contain 556 apartments as well as 3,700 m^{2} (40,000 sq ft) of commercial space and an open-air cinema. Construction began in September 2023.
22=	One Medlock Street Tower 2		64 (210)	14	2028	Office	Southern Gateway	The scheme consists of two towers. Tower 1 is a 39-storey purpose-built student accommodation tower while Tower 2 is a 14-storey office tower with a corten steel facade. Construction began in August 2025.
24	Lumina Village Tower 1		60 (197)	20	2025	Residential	Stretford, Trafford	A scheme consisting of four towers containing 639 apartments as well as an extensive 5.4 acres (2.2 ha) of communal garden spaces.
25	The Republic		59 (194)	13	2028	Office	Piccadilly, Manchester	Forms a key component of the first phase of the regeneration of Mayfield in the Piccadilly area of central Manchester, delivering over 22,000 m^{2} (240,000 sq ft) of Grade A office space.
26=	IQ, Echo Street Tower 3		53 (174)	17	2025	Student accommodation	Piccadilly, Manchester	A collection of three co-living student accommodation towers in the Piccadilly area containing 1,224 rooms and all-inclusive amenities.
26=	Regent Plaza Tower 3		53 (174)	18	2029	Residential	Ordsall, Salford	A five-tower complex development on Regent Road in Salford that contains 525 apartments. As of 2025 two of the smallest blocks have been completed, however the remaining development appears to have stalled.

=== Approved ===
This list includes buildings that have gained planning approval from the relevant council authority in Greater Manchester and are planned to rise at least 50 metres (160 ft).

Rank	Name	Image	Height m (ft)	Floors	Year (est.)	Usage	Location	Notes
1	Regent Park, Ordsall Lane Tower 6		241.5 (792)	78	2030	Residential	Ordsall, Salford	Proposed in June 2023, the tower will become the tallest building in Salford and the second-tallest in Greater Manchester on completion. Approved in November 2025.
2	The Lighthouse		213 (699)	71	2030	Residential	New Jackson, Castlefield, Manchester	The third-tallest proposal in Greater Manchester and is due to surpass Deansgate Square South Tower as the focal point of the New Jackson skyscraper district. Includes a restaurant on the 71st floor - the tallest in the UK. Approved in August 2024.
3	Regent Park, Ordsall Lane Tower 5		188 (617)	60	2030	Residential	Ordsall, Salford	Proposed in June 2023, the tower forms part of the wider Regent Park proposal. Approved in November 2025.
4	Red Bank Plot 10		181 (594)	55	2031	Residential	Red Bank, Manchester	Following on from Victoria Riverside which completed in 2024, and Red Bank Riverside currently U/C, Red Bank Phase 3 is a future phase of the wider Victoria North masterplan - a large new neighbourhood in the north side of central Manchester. Approved in April 2023.
5	One Heritage Tower		173 (567)	55	2033	Residential	Greengate, Salford	Proposed to become the tallest focal point in the modern Greengate skyscraper development area. However, as of 2025 the project appears to have stalled and new plans for the site are expected. Approved in January 2020.
6=	Park Place Tower 1		172 (564)	56	2033	Residential	New Jackson, Castlefield, Manchester	Part of the final phases of the New Jackson skyscraper district, the twin towers border Mancunian Way and will contain 1,037 apartments feature bevelled edges along the height of the towers. Approved in November 2024.
6=	Park Place Tower 2		172 (564)	56	2033	Residential	New Jackson, Castlefield, Manchester	Part of the final phases of the New Jackson skyscraper district, the twin towers border Mancunian Way and will contain 1,037 apartments feature bevelled edges along the height of the towers. Approved in November 2024.
8	Student Castle		165 (541)	55	2033	Student accommodation	Southern Gateway, Manchester	Located near the Manchester's university area, an 850-bed brick tower proposal which is set to be the largest purpose-built student accommodation tower in the UK. Approved in July 2021.
9	Cotton Quay, Salford Quays Tower 1		158 (518)	48	2035	Residential	Salford Quays, Salford	The redevelopment of Cotton Quay is a nationally significant mixed-use new waterfront community development that will feature over 1,500 new homes. As of 2025 planning approval has expired with the developer looking to sell on the site. Approved in March 2020.
10=	The Green Tower 1		154 (505)	52	2029	Residential	New Jackson, Castlefield, Manchester	A collective of two sets of twin towers containing 1,746 apartments as part of some of the final phases of the New Jackson skyscraper district. The four towers are identical in design and the two sets only vary by height. Approved in August 2024.
10=	The Green Tower 2		154 (505)	52	2029	Residential	New Jackson, Castlefield, Manchester	A collective of two sets of twin towers containing 1,746 apartments as part of some of the final phases of the New Jackson skyscraper district. The four towers are identical in design and the two sets only vary by height. Approved in August 2024.
12	Trinity Islands Plot C Tower 1		146 (479)	48	2029	Residential	Castlefield, Manchester	A two-tower development due to be constructed after the completion of Vista River Gardens and Trinity Heights. In total, these four towers deliver 1,950 apartments on the western edge of Castlefield. Approved in February 2022.
13=	The Green Tower 3		141 (462)	48	2029	Residential	New Jackson, Castlefield, Manchester	A collective of two sets of twin towers containing 1,746 apartments as part of some of the final phases of the New Jackson skyscraper district. The four towers are identical in design and the two sets only vary by height. Approved in August 2024.
13=	The Green Tower 4		141 (462)	48	2029	Residential	New Jackson, Castlefield, Manchester	A collective of two sets of twin towers containing 1,746 apartments as part of some of the final phases of the New Jackson skyscraper district. The four towers are identical in design and the two sets only vary by height. Approved in August 2024.
15	Glenbrook Tower		137 (449)	45	2030	Residential	Castlefield, Manchester	The tower will feature an arched terracotta ground floor colonnade and offer 364 new homes and 720 m^{2} (7,800 sq ft) of amenity space. Approved in April 2025.
16	The Peak, Meadowside		131 (430)	41	2032	Residential	NOMA, Manchester	The tallest tower development proposal in the NOMA area of central Manchester. As of 2025, the status of the tower is unclear with a separate leisure scheme granted a 2-year approval on the tower site. Approved in August 2017.
17	X1 Michigan Tower 1		127 (417)	41	2030	Residential	Salford Quays, Salford	A development that consists of four towers within Salford Quays. Tower 1 at 41 storeys will become the tallest tower in the Quays. Tower 2, the second-tallest, is the first to be constructed. Approved in June 2020.
18=	Regent Park, Ordsall Lane Tower 1		126 (413)	40	2030	Residential	Ordsall, Salford	Proposed in June 2023, the towers form part of the wider Regent Park proposal. Approved in November 2025.
18=	Regent Park, Ordsall Lane Tower 4		126 (413)	40	2030	Residential	Ordsall, Salford	Proposed in June 2023, the towers form part of the wider Regent Park proposal. Approved in November 2025.
20	Enclave		125 (410)	42	2031	Residential	Greengate, Salford	A tower development in the modern Greengate skyscraper development area which would deliver 568 studio flats. Approved in September 2024.
21	Red Bank Plot 17		124 (407)	37	2031	Residential	Red Bank, Manchester	Following on from Victoria Riverside which completed in 2024, and Red Bank Riverside currently U/C, Red Bank Phase 3 is a future phase of the wider Victoria North masterplan - a large new neighbourhood on the north side of central Manchester. Approved in April 2023.
22=	Cotton Quay, Salford Quays Tower 2		123 (403)	37	2035	Residential	Salford Quays, Salford	The redevelopment of Cotton Quay is a nationally significant mixed-use new waterfront community development that will features over 1,500 new homes. As of 2025 planning approval has expired with the developer looking to sell on the site. Approved in March 2020.
25	Hotspur Yard Tower		116 (380)	39	2031	Student accommodation	Southern Gateway, Manchester	Features a bronze facade and is designed in conjunction with the historic Hotspur Press mill and will deliver 619 student rooms. In summer 2025 a major fire took place in the Hotspur Press mill, making the status of this project unclear. Approved in May 2024.
26	Red Bank Plot 6		114 (374)	34	2031	Residential	Red Bank, Manchester	Following on from Victoria Riverside which completed in 2024, and Red Bank Riverside currently U/C, Red Bank Phase 3 is a future phase of the wider Victoria North masterplan - a large new neighbourhood in the north side of central Manchester. Approved in April 2023.
27	Great Northern Warehouse Tower 1		112 (367)	36	2031	Residential	Central Business District, Manchester	The regeneration of the Great Northern Warehouse consists of three towers delivering 746 homes across three towers, as well as 14,000 m^{2} (150,000 sq ft) of office space. Approved in February 2023.
28	The Gasworks Tower 1		107 (351)	35	2032	Residential	NOMA, Manchester	A major development across five residential towers adjacent to Angel Meadow Park and the Red Bank development area. The towers will deliver over 1,200 homes. Approved in May 2021.
29	Room2 Hometel		106 (348)	33	2034	Hotel	Piccadilly, Manchester	A 251-bedroom tower which incorporates redevelopment of the vacant Grade II listed Union Bank building. The 'hometel' concept combines elements of Airbnb and hotels to offer an alternative form of accommodation. Approved in May 2021.
30	Fulcrum Tower, Regent Park, Ordsall Lane		104 (341)	33	2030	Residential	Ordsall, Salford	Proposed in June 2023, the tower forms part of the wider Regent Park proposal. Approved in November 2025.
31	Middlewood Locks Plots E & N Tower 1		101 (331)	32	2032	Residential	Ordsall, Salford	A major development adjacent to Castlefield which will deliver 909 homes across five tower blocks, as well as over 2,000 m^{2} (22,000 sq ft) of commercial space. Approved in March 2022.
32=	Cotton Quay, Salford Quays Tower 3		99 (325)	31	2035	Residential	Salford Quays, Salford	The redevelopment of Cotton Quay is a nationally significant mixed-use new waterfront community development that will features over 1,500 new homes. As of 2025 planning approval has expired with the developer looking to sell on the site. Approved in March 2020.
32=	Soapworks, Ivy Wharf Tower 1		99 (325)	33	2032	Residential	Salford Quays, Salford	A three-tower development scheme which will deliver 578 homes, a 12-storey transport hub and 9,300 m^{2} (100,000 sq ft) of office space. Approved in May 2025.
34	X1 Michigan Tower 3		97 (318)	31	2030	Residential	Salford Quays, Salford	A development that consists of four towers within Salford Quays. Tower 1 at 41 storeys will become the tallest tower in the Quays. Tower 2, the second-tallest, is the first to be constructed. Approved in June 2020.
35=	PAG / MODA Tower		96 (315)	30	2030	Student accommodation	Chorlton-on-Medlock, Manchester	The largest building in the Life Sciences corridor in the university district of Manchester. The masterplan delivers over 2,000 student beds and nearly 50,000 m^{2} (540,000 sq ft) of life sciences space. The largest tower delivers 983 beds. Approved in January 2024.
35=	Vita Student, First Street		96 (315)	33	2030	Student accommodation	Southern Gateway, Manchester	Will offer 841 student beds with 129 rooms set to be affordable close to the Oxford Road corridor and the university districts. Approved in April 2025.
37	Cotton Quays Tower 4		92 (302)	27	2035	Residential	Salford Quays, Salford	The redevelopment of Cotton Quay is a nationally significant mixed-use new waterfront community development that will features over 1,500 new homes. As of 2025 planning approval has expired with the developer looking to sell on the site. Approved in March 2020.
38=	Great Northern Warehouse Tower 2		91 (298)	30	2031	Residential	Central Business District, Manchester	The regeneration of the Great Northern Warehouse consists of three towers delivering 746 homes across three towers, as well as 14,000 m^{2} (150,000 sq ft) of office space. Approved in February 2023.
38=	Regent Park, Ordsall Lane Tower 2		91 (298)	29	2030	Residential	Ordsall, Salford	Proposed in June 2023, the tower forms part of the wider Regent Park proposal. Approved in November 2025.
40	One Cathedral Square Tower 1		90 (295)	27	2032	Residential	Central Business District, Manchester	Will deliver 300 apartments and is the centrepiece of the mixed-used redevelopment of the northern end of Deansgate. The scheme also includes a 4,600-square-metre (50,000 sq ft) office development. Approved in February 2023.
41	Salford Steps Tower		87 (285)	29	2034	Student accommodation	Pendleton, Salford	Will deliver a 29-storey, 538-bed tower on a disused brownfield site close to the University of Salford. Approved in September 2023.
42	Sparkle Street Tower		86 (282)	29	2032	Residential	Piccadilly, Manchester	Regenerates a brownfield site in Piccadilly and includes 359 apartments and townhouses, along with communal residential gardens. Approved in November 2024.
43	Middlewood Locks Plots E & N Tower 2		85 (279)	28	2032	Residential	Ordsall, Salford	A major development adjacent to Castlefield which will deliver 909 homes across five tower blocks, as well as over 2,000 m^{2} (22,000 sq ft) of commercial space. Approved in March 2022.
44=	The Alberton		84 (276)	19	2030	Office	Central Business District, Manchester	A 20,500-square-metre (221,000 sq ft) office building which also features a rooftop pool and wellness centre. Approved in September 2022.
44=	Plot J & K Mayfield Tower 1		84 (276)	28	2031	Residential	Piccadilly, Manchester	The plots will deliver four towers as part of the initial phases of the Mayfield regeneration area, with a combined 879 flats. Approved in July 2025.
46	Cotton Quay Tower 5		80 (262)	25	2035	Residential	Salford Quays, Salford	The redevelopment of Cotton Quay is a nationally significant mixed-use new waterfront community development that will feature over 1,500 new homes. As of 2025 planning approval has expired with the developer looking to sell on the site. Approved in March 2020.
47=	One Park Place Tower 1		79 (259)	25	2031	Residential	Cheetham Hill, Manchester	A 154-apartment two-tower development with 185 m^{2} (1,990 sq ft) of commercial space. Approved in January 2024.
47=	Wavelength, Furnace Quay		79 (259)	27	2032	Residential	Salford Quays, Salford	A 421-apartment development across two buildings. As of 2025 the future of the tower is in doubt despite planning approval, with the site up for sale and a redesigned proposal likely. Approved in December 2019.
49	Vivere, No1 Cornbrook, Chester Road		78 (256)	24	2030	Residential	Stretford, Trafford	A 224-apartment residential tower situated on Cornbrook Road. Approved in July 2024.
50	Colloco		76 (249)	18	2035	Office	Spinningfields, Manchester	A striking blue brick 18,500 m^{2} (199,000 sq ft) office proposal in Spinningfields. Approved in March 2024.
51	Carnarvon Heights Tower 1		75 (246)	24	2035	Residential	Cheetham Hill, Manchester	A two-tower proposal that will deliver 237 apartments. Approved in November 2024.
52	St George's Place		74 (243)	23	2035	Residential	Hulme, Manchester	A development framework that is proposed to deliver 366 apartments across four towers. As of 2025 the future of this proposal is uncertain, six years after planning approval was granted. Approved in June 2019.
53=	McLaren Student Tower		73 (239)	23	2028	Student accommodation	Chorlton-on-Medlock, Manchester	Part of the Life Sciences corridor in the university district of Manchester. The masterplan delivers over 2,000 student beds and nearly 50,000 m^{2} (540,000 sq ft) of life sciences space. Approved in January 2024.
53=	Regent Park, Ordsall Lane Tower 3		73 (239)	23	2030	Residential	Ordsall, Salford	Proposed in June 2023, the tower forms part of the wider Regent Park proposal. Approved in November 2025.
55	20–36 High Street		71 (233)	22	2032	Residential	Central Business District, Manchester	A residential scheme that is due to deliver 361 apartments, as well as 1,100 m^{2} (12,000 sq ft) of commercial space. As of 2025 the future of this proposal is unclear with little progress made to construction since planning approval. Approved in October 2019.
56	Viadux 2, Tower 2		70 (230)	23	2029	Residential	Central Business District, Manchester	The accompanying tower to Viadux 2, Tower 1 - the largest proposed tower in Greater Manchester. Tower 2 is a purely affordable living tower that will be delivered as part of the Viadux 2 framework. Approved in April 2025.
57=	Speakers House		69 (226)	17	2032	Office	Central Business District, Manchester	A modern 12,500-square-metre (135,000 sq ft) office development, with retail and restaurant units on its lower floors, proposed for the Deansgate thoroughfare. Approved in January 2022.
57=	Plot J & K Mayfield Tower 2		69 (226)	23	2031	Residential	Piccadilly, Manchester	The plots will deliver four towers as part of the initial phases of the Mayfield regeneration area, with a combined 879 flats. Approved in July 2025.
59	Cotton Quay, Salford Quays Tower 6		66 (217)	21	2035	Residential	Salford Quays, Salford	The redevelopment of Cotton Quay is a nationally significant mixed-use new waterfront community development that will features over 1,500 new homes. As of 2025 planning approval has expired with the developer looking to sell on the site. Approved in March 2020.
60	Uno Tower 1		64 (210)	14	2034	Office	Southern Gateway, Manchester	An office development across two buildings delivering 34,500 m^{2} (371,000 sq ft) of office space. Approved in January 2021.
61	Plot J & K Mayfield Tower 3		63 (207)	21	2031	Residential	Piccadilly, Manchester	The plots will deliver four towers as part of the initial phases of the Mayfield regeneration area, with a combined 879 flats. Approved in July 2025.
62=	Ralli Quays Tower 1		62 (203)	16	2032	Office	Greengate, Salford	Consists of a 20,000 square metres (220,000 sq ft), 16-storey office block and a 14-storey, 280-bedroom hotel. Approved in January 2022.
62=	All Saints Library		62 (203)	15	2033	Library	Chorlton-on-Medlock, Manchester	A 22,000-square-metre (240,000 sq ft) learning, research and collaboration hub for university students on Oxford Road. Approved in February 2024.
64=	X1 Manchester Waters Tower E		60 (197)	18	2032	Residential	Stretford, Trafford	A collection of five residential towers delivering 742 apartments in total and forms a part of the wider Pomona Island regeneration framework. Approved in May 2021.
64=	Gallery Gardens Tower 1		60 (197)	18	2034	Residential	Stretford, Manchester	A four-tower residential scheme that is proposed to deliver over 350 apartments. As of 2025 the original developer has filed for bankruptcy, putting the future of the proposal into question. Approved in August 2021.
66	Fraser & Kendals Buildings		59 (194)	14	2035	Office	Central Business District, Manchester	Redevelopment of the buildings will deliver 52,000 m^{2} (560,000 sq ft) of office and commercial space. As of 2025 progress is uncertain, four years after planning approval was granted. Approved in August 2021.
67=	Reedham House		58 (190)	14	2032	Office	Central Business District, Manchester	A 4,800-square-metre (52,000 sq ft) office proposal. Approved in September 2023.
67=	Plot 10, First Street		58 (190)	13	2035	Office	Southern Gateway, Manchester	A large commercial building proposal that will deliver 28,000 m^{2} (300,000 sq ft) of office space. Approved in October 2022.
69=	Great Northern Warehouse Tower 3		57 (187)	17	2031	Residential	Central Business District, Manchester	The regeneration of the Great Northern Warehouse consists of three towers delivering 746 homes across three towers, as well as 14,000 m^{2} (150,000 sq ft) of office space. Approved in February 2023.
69=	One Cathedral Square Tower 2		57 (187)	17	2032	Residential	Central Business District, Manchester	Will deliver 300 apartments and is the centrepiece of the mixed-used redevelopment of the northern end of Deansgate. The scheme also includes a 4,600-square-metre (50,000 sq ft) office development. Approved in February 2023.
69=	1 Lord Street		57 (187)	16	2033	Residential	Green Quarter, Manchester	Proposed to deliver 192 apartments, as well as 167 m^{2} (1,800 sq ft) of retail space. As of 2025 this tower is in doubt given the length of time passed since planning approval, with the developer looking to sell the site on. Approved in November 2016.
69=	2 Angel Square		57 (187)	14	2034	Office	NOMA, Manchester	A large office development proposal due to deliver over 18,000 m^{2} (190,000 sq ft) of office space and a further 1,600 m^{2} (17,000 sq ft) of commercial space. Approved in September 2023.
73	Carnarvon Heights Tower 2		55 (180)	18	2035	Residential	Cheetham Hill, Manchester	A two-tower proposal that will deliver 237 apartments. Approved in November 2024.
74=	Plot J & K Mayfield Tower 4		54 (177)	18	2031	Residential	Piccadilly, Manchester	The plots will deliver four towers as part of the initial phases of the Mayfield regeneration area, with a combined 879 flats. Approved in July 2025.
74=	The Gasworks Tower 2		54 (177)	18	2032	Residential	NOMA, Manchester	A major development across five residential towers adjacent to Angel Meadow Park and the Red Bank development area. The towers will deliver over 1,200 homes. Approved in May 2021.
74=	X1 Manchester Waters Tower D		54 (177)	16	2032	Residential	Stretford, Trafford	A collection of five residential towers delivering 742 apartments in total and forms a part of the wider Pomona Island regeneration framework. Approved in May 2021.
77=	3 Angel Square		53 (174)	13	2030	Office	NOMA, Manchester	A large office development proposal due to deliver over 22,500 m^{2} (242,000 sq ft) of office space and a further 2,100 m^{2} (23,000 sq ft) of commercial space. Approved in September 2023.
77=	Ralli Quays Tower 2		53 (174)	14	2032	Office	Greengate, Salford	Consists of a 20,000-square-metre (220,000 sq ft), 16-storey office block and a 14-storey, 280-bedroom hotel. Approved in January 2022.
79	Plot C3, Media City		52 (171)	12	2034	Office	Salford Quays, Salford	A triangular office development featuring 29,000 m^{2} (310,000 sq ft) of office space and 2,500 m^{2} (27,000 sq ft) of co-working areas. Approved in September 2022.
80=	Soapworks, Ivy Wharf Tower 2		51 (167)	17	2032	Residential	Salford Quays, Salford	A three-tower development scheme which will deliver 578 homes, a 12-storey transport hub and 9,300 m^{2} (100,000 sq ft) of office space. Approved in May 2025.
80=	Uno, City Road Tower 2, First Street		51 (167)	11	2034	Office	Southern Gateway, Manchester	An office development across two buildings delivering 34,500 m^{2} (371,000 sq ft) of office space. Approved in January 2021.
82=	One Park Place Tower 2		50 (164)	15	2031	Residential	Cheetham Hill, Manchester	A 154-apartment, two-tower development with 185 m^{2} (1,990 sq ft) of commercial space. Approved in January 2024.
82=	Meininger Hotel		50 (164)	12	2034	Hotel	Ancoats, Manchester	The first Manchester proposal from Meininger. The development is proposed to deliver a 212-bed hotel. As of 2025 the future of this proposal is unclear with little activity since gaining planning approval in 2019. Approved in December 2019.

== Tallest unbuilt or demolished ==
=== Unbuilt ===
This lists proposals for the construction of buildings in Greater Manchester that were planned to rise at least 100 metres (330 ft), for which planning permission was rejected or which were otherwise withdrawn.

Rank	Name	Image	Height m (ft)	Floors	Year (est.)	Primary Use	Location	Notes
1	Trinity Tower X		213 (699)	67	2021	Residential / Retail	Castlefield, Manchester	Approved in July 2017, Trinity Islands would have delivered nearly 1,400 apartments at a cost of £1.3 billion. The scheme originally consisted of five towers with Tower X reaching a height of 213 m (699 ft), making it the tallest building in Greater Manchester and tallest in the UK outside London.
2	Intercontinental Tower		200 (656)	48	2010	Hotel / Residential	Central Business District, Manchester	Proposed in 2008, Intercontinental Tower was a major skyscraper development proposed for the central business district of central Manchester. It would have featured a five-star luxury hotel run by Intercontinental, the first of its chain in Manchester as well as a helipad and two decorative spires. The skyscraper was cancelled in the wake of the financial crash in 2010.
3	Piccadilly Tower		188 (617)	60	2008	Hotel / Residential	Piccadilly, Manchester	Proposed in 2005, Piccadilly Tower was a major skyscraper proposal incorporating both hotel and residential space for the Piccadilly area of central Manchester. The 60-storey tower featured two adjoining blocks and would have delivered over 700 apartments and a 220-room five star hotel as well as retail space, restaurants and bars. Construction began in January 2008 but the project was placed on hold in September 2008 due to the economic recession. As of summer 2016 the developer had placed the plot on the market for sale with an extension for approved planning.
4	Vector Arena Tower		186 (610)	36	2003	Hotel	Central Business District, Manchester	Proposed in 2003. If built it would have been the tallest hotel in the UK, however the project was cancelled when it could not be financed.
5	Greengate Tower		179 (587)	62	2009	Residential	Greengate, Salford	Proposed in 2006. At the time, if built it would have been the tallest building in Greater Manchester. The project was cancelled in 2009 before construction begun in the wake of economic recession.
6	St John's Place		168 (551)	54	2019	Office / Residential	St John's, Manchester	Proposed in 2016. It was due to deliver significant office space as well as over 400 apartments. Cancelled before construction began due to unresolved development and funding issues.
7=	Canopus Tower A		160 (525)	36	2008	Residential	Greengate, Salford	Proposed in 2006, was a major £180 million development project consisting of two towers. The tallest tower would have reached 160 m (520 ft) to become one of the tallest in Greater Manchester and would have featured a rooftop swimming pool. The towers were cancelled in the wake of economic recession.
7=	Albany Crown Tower		160 (525)	54	2010	Hotel / Office / Residential	Piccadilly, Manchester	Proposed in 2005. It was due to deliver significant numbers of hotel rooms and residential apartments. However, due to the economic recession funding dried up and the developer went into administration in 2010 before construction began.
9	Vivo Tower D		149 (489)	50	2009	Residential	Castlefield, Manchester	Proposed in 2005. The scheme was pulled in the wake of the economic recession before construction began. Plans for the area were revised in 2015 with the Deansgate Square collection of skyscrapers subsequently built on the site.
10=	Trinity Tower V		140 (459)	41	2021	Residential	Castlefield, Manchester	Approved in July 2017, Trinity Islands would have delivered nearly 1,400 apartments at a cost of £1.3 billion. The scheme originally consisted of five towers with Tower V reaching a height of 140 m (460 ft).
10=	1 Hardman Square		140 (459)	36	2011	Office	Spinningfields, Manchester	Proposed in 2004. The economic recession of 2008 resulted in a shortage of funding. The scheme was revived in 2013 where it became known and constructed as the 92 m (302 ft) 1 Spinningfields development.
12	Urban Splash Development		137 (449)	30	2006	Office	Piccadilly, Manchester	Proposed in 2006. It was cancelled before approval was granted owing to a lack of funding.
13=	Whitworth Street West		128 (420)	42	2007	Residential	Castlefield, Manchester	Proposed in 2005. It was cancelled due to economic recession but the scheme has since been revived in the form of the approved 117-metre (384 ft) 10–12 Whitworth Street Tower.
13=	Trinity Tower Y		128 (420)	37	2021	Residential	Castlefield, Manchester	Approved in July 2017, Trinity Islands would have delivered nearly 1,400 apartments at a cost of £1.3 billion. The scheme originally consisted of five towers with Tower Y reaching a height of 128 m (420 ft). The Trinity Islands development was bought by Renaker in October 2018.
15=	Zarachie Tower		116 (381)	36	2008	Office / Residential	Piccadilly, Manchester	Proposed in 2005, Zarachie Tower, also known as Gravity Tower and Store Street Tower, was a major tower delivering both office and residential units in the Piccadilly area of central Manchester. It was cancelled due to economic recession when funding dried up before construction began.
15=	Vision Tower		116 (381)	35	2025	Residential	Castlefield, Manchester	Proposed in 2015. After long delays a new proposal for the site was put forward in 2025.
17=	Dime		115 (337)	36	2019	Residential	St John's, Manchester	Proposed in 2017, Nickel and Dime were twin residential towers which would have delivered over 600 apartments situated in a new neighbourhood in the St John's area of central Manchester. The towers were scrapped in favour of the Union Living Tower proposed in 2019.
17=	Nickel		115 (337)	36	2019	Residential	St John's, Manchester	Proposed in 2017, Nickel and Dime were twin residential towers which would have delivered over 600 apartments situated in a new neighbourhood in the St John's area of central Manchester. The towers were scrapped in favour of the Union Living Tower proposed in 2019.
19	Plot G, Great Jackson Street Tower 1		112 (367)	36	2021	Residential	Castlefield, Manchester	Proposed in April 2019, Plot G, Great Jackson Street was a major skyscraper development proposal consisting of two towers. It is part of a future phase of skyscraper development in the southern gateway to central Manchester next to Deansgate Square.
20=	Quay Street Tower		110 (361)	40	1948	Office	Central Business District, Manchester	Proposed in 1948, the Quay Street Tower was a proposed extension to Sunlight House, an existing 46 m (151 ft) building in the central business district of central Manchester. The scheme was scrapped as it was seen as an insensitive development so soon after the Second World War.
20=	Modus Properties Tower		110 (361)	32	2010	Residential	Old Trafford, Trafford	Proposed in 2006, Modus Properties Tower was a major residential development proposed for Old Trafford, 2 miles (3.2 km) west of central Manchester. If built it would have been the tallest building in the borough of Trafford. The scheme was scrapped in 2010 when Modus Properties went into administration.
22	Canopus Tower B		109 (358)	31	2008	Residential	Greengate, Salford	Proposed in 2006, Canopus was a major £180 million development project consisting of two towers in the Greengate area of Salford. The smaller tower would have reached 109 m (358 ft) to become one of the tallest in Greater Manchester. The towers were cancelled in the wake of economic recession.
23	Vista Tower, Clippers Quay		107 (351)	34	2020	Residential	Salford Quays, Salford	Proposed in 2018, Vista Tower was a significant residential development proposed for Salford Quays delivering over 200 apartments. The planning application was subsequently withdrawn in 2019.
24	St Michael's Tower A		105 (344)	32	2017	Office / Residential	Central Business District, Manchester	Proposed in 2016, St Michael's was a major mixed-use development consisting of two towers proposed for the central business district of central Manchester. Due to intense push back from heritage groups concerned about the impact of the towers in the area the planning application was withdrawn in 2017. A revised proposal containing only one tower, the 136 m (446 ft) St Michael's Tower was subsequently approved in 2018.
25	Vivo Tower B		103 (338)	34	2009	Residential	Castlefield, Manchester	Proposed in 2005, Vivo Tower B was the second-tallest tower in a collection of towers at the southern end of Deansgate in the southern gateway to central Manchester. The scheme was pulled in the wake of the economic recession before construction began. Plans for the area were revised in 2015 with the Deansgate Square collection of skyscrapers subsequently built on the site.

=== Demolished ===
This lists buildings and structures in Greater Manchester that were at least 50 metres (164 ft) tall and have since been demolished.

Rank	Name	Image	Height m (ft)	Floors	Year (est.)	Year Demolished (est.)	Primary Use	Location	Notes
1	Manchester Assize Courts		85 (279)	7	1864	1957	Government	Strangeways, Manchester	Manchester Assize Courts was a Venetian Gothic building housing law courts, constructed in the mid-19th century. Upon completion, it held the title of the tallest building in Manchester for 13 years, until Manchester Town Hall was finished. The building was damaged beyond repair during the Manchester Blitz and was demolished in 1957.
2	Mathematics Tower		75 (246)	18	1968	2005	University	Chorlton-on-Medlock, Manchester	The Mathematics Tower was a Brutalist building on Oxford Road in central Manchester. It housed the mathematics department of the Victoria University of Manchester and, briefly, the newly amalgamated University of Manchester from 1968 to 2004. The structure comprised a three-storey podium and an 18-storey, 75 m (246 ft) tower. It was demolished in 2005 after the department relocated to the Alan Turing Building.
3	Owens Park		61 (200)	19	1965	2024	Hall of residence	Fallowfield, Manchester	Built to house students from the University of Manchester, Owens Park accommodated a number of notable residents, including Radiohead guitarist Ed O'Brien and comedians Rik Mayall and Jack Whitehall. Demolition began in 2024 to make way for new accommodation.
4	B of the Bang		55 (180)	N/A	2005	2009	Sculpture	Beswick, Manchester	B of the Bang was the tallest sculpture in the UK when built to commemorate the 2002 Commonwealth Games in Manchester. It was dismantled and placed in storage in 2009 after several spikes detached, making it unsafe.
5=	Sunnyside Court		50 (164)	18	1972	1998	Residential	Ordsall, Salford	Sunnyside Court was a residential building constructed in Ordsall. It was demolished in 1998 to make way for new developments.
5=	Fujitsu Tower		50 (164)	13	1968	2018	Office	Ardwick, Manchester	Fujitsu Tower was a 1960s office block constructed in the Ardwick area of east Manchester. It was demolished in 2018 to make way for new developments.

== Timeline of tallest buildings ==
After a period after the 1960s building boom where few new significant buildings were built in Greater Manchester, the early 21st century has seen a long list of proposals meaning the skyline has been transformed in recent decades. The first towers over 100 m (330 ft) were the CIS Tower and the City Tower, the former of which kept the title of tallest building in Greater Manchester for 44 years until the Beetham Tower was completed in 2006. In 2018 Deansgate Square South Tower became the tallest building in Greater Manchester and the tallest in the UK outside London.

Years Tallest	Name	Image	Height m (ft)	Floors	Year (est.)	Primary Use	Location	Notes
1848–1858 (10 years)	Salford Cathedral		73 (240)	N/A	1848	Place of worship	Blackfriars, Salford	The tallest building in Greater Manchester upon its completion in 1848. Salford Cathedral is still a prominent building on the East Lancashire Road approaching central Manchester.
1858–1864 (6 years)	Church of St Mary		74 (241)	N/A	1858	Place of worship	Hulme, Manchester	The tallest building in Manchester when it was completed in 1858 for six years until the Manchester Assize Courts were constructed in 1864.
1864–1877 (13 years)	Manchester Assize Courts		85 (279)	7	1864	Government	Strangeways, Manchester	A Venetian gothic building housing law courts constructed in the middle of the 19th century. When it was completed it held the title of the tallest building in Manchester for 13 years until Manchester Town Hall was completed. It was damaged beyond repair during the Manchester Blitz and was demolished in 1957.
1877–1962 (85 years)	Manchester Town Hall Clock Tower		87 (285)	N/A	1877	Government	Central Business District, Manchester	The tallest building in Manchester for 85 years from 1877 until the CIS Tower was completed in 1962. Manchester Town Hall remains a prominent focal point in the city.
1962–2006 (44 years)	CIS Tower		118 (387)	25	1962	Office	NOMA, Manchester	The UK's tallest building upon completion in 1962. As of June 2026, it remains the tallest office building outside London and the tallest building in the northern part of central Manchester.
2006–2018 (12 years)	Beetham Tower		169 (554)	47	2006	Hotel / Residential	Castlefield, Manchester	Second-tallest building in the UK outside London. Its roof height reaches 158 m (518 ft). Upon completion in 2006, it became the tallest building in Greater Manchester, surpassing the CIS Tower by over 50 m (160 ft).
2018–present	Deansgate Square South Tower		201 (659)	65	2018	Residential	Castlefield, Manchester	Tallest building in the UK outside London. As of June 2026, it is the 12th-tallest by height and has the fourth-highest floor count in the UK.

== Total buildings by borough ==
The table shows the total number of tall buildings in Greater Manchester by borough. Each building is only included once e.g. Deansgate South Tower is included in the ≥200m column but not in the ≥150m column.

Updated 11 September 2026

Total tall buildings by borough
Borough	≥200m	≥150m	≥100m	≥75m	≥50m	Total
Manchester	1	9	14	19	73	116
Salford	—	1	5	9	58	73
Rochdale	—	—	—	—	8	8
Trafford	—	—	—	—	8	8
Stockport	—	—	—	—	7	7
Bolton	—	—	—	—	1	1
Oldham	—	—	—	—	1	1
Bury	—	—	—	—	—	0
Tameside	—	—	—	—	—	0
Wigan	—	—	—	—	—	0
Total	1	10	19	28	156	214

== See also ==
- List of tallest buildings in the United Kingdom
- List of tallest buildings in Europe
- List of tallest buildings
