= One Medlock Street =

High-rise building under construction in Manchester, England

- Interactive map of the One Medlock Street area

General information
- Status: Under construction
- Type: Purpose-built student accommodation
- Location: Medlock Street, Manchester, England
- Coordinates: 53.4712°N 2.2476°W
- Construction started: 2025
- Estimated completion: 2028
- Owner: Greystar

Height
- Height: 117 m (384 ft)

Technical details
- Floor count: 11 and 38

Design and construction
- Architecture firm: Jon Matthews Architects
- Main contractor: HG Construction

Other information
- Number of units: 1,014

One Medlock Street is a purpose-built student accommodation building under construction on Medlock Street in Manchester, England. The part 11-storey, part 38-storey building will contain 1,014 units and was designed by Jon Matthews Architects. Once completed in 2028, it will be 117 metres (384 ft) and the 17th-tallest building in Greater Manchester.

== History ==
=== Planning ===
In September 2022, Whitbread and the developer Dominus published plans for the redevelopment of the site on Medlock Street which contained a 5-storey Premier Inn hotel and which sits within Manchester City Council's First Street Development Framework.

A planning application for the demolition of the hotel and construction of two separate buildings: a 13-storey office with a ground-floor commercial unit covering 392,800 sq ft (36,490 m^{2}), and a part 11-storey, part 38-storey building with 1,014 purpose-built student accommodation units, was submitted to the council in November 2022.

In June 2023, approval was recommended by the council's planning committee, with the decision being formally issued for the project in November 2023. In July 2024, it was reported that Student Roost, which was bought by Greystar in 2022, had acquired the former Premier Inn site and the student housing part of the scheme from Whitbread, but not the office building.

=== Construction ===
Greystar and its main contractor HG Construction received final approval to commence work in May 2025 and the development is expected to be operational in 2028.

== Amenities ==
One Medlock Street will include 13,000 square feet (1,200 m^{2}) of amenities for residents, such as a gym, yoga studio, study areas, meeting rooms, screening rooms, shared lounges, and games rooms.

== See also ==
- List of tallest buildings and structures in Greater Manchester
- List of tallest buildings in the United Kingdom
