= Embankment Exchange =

Residential development in Salford, England

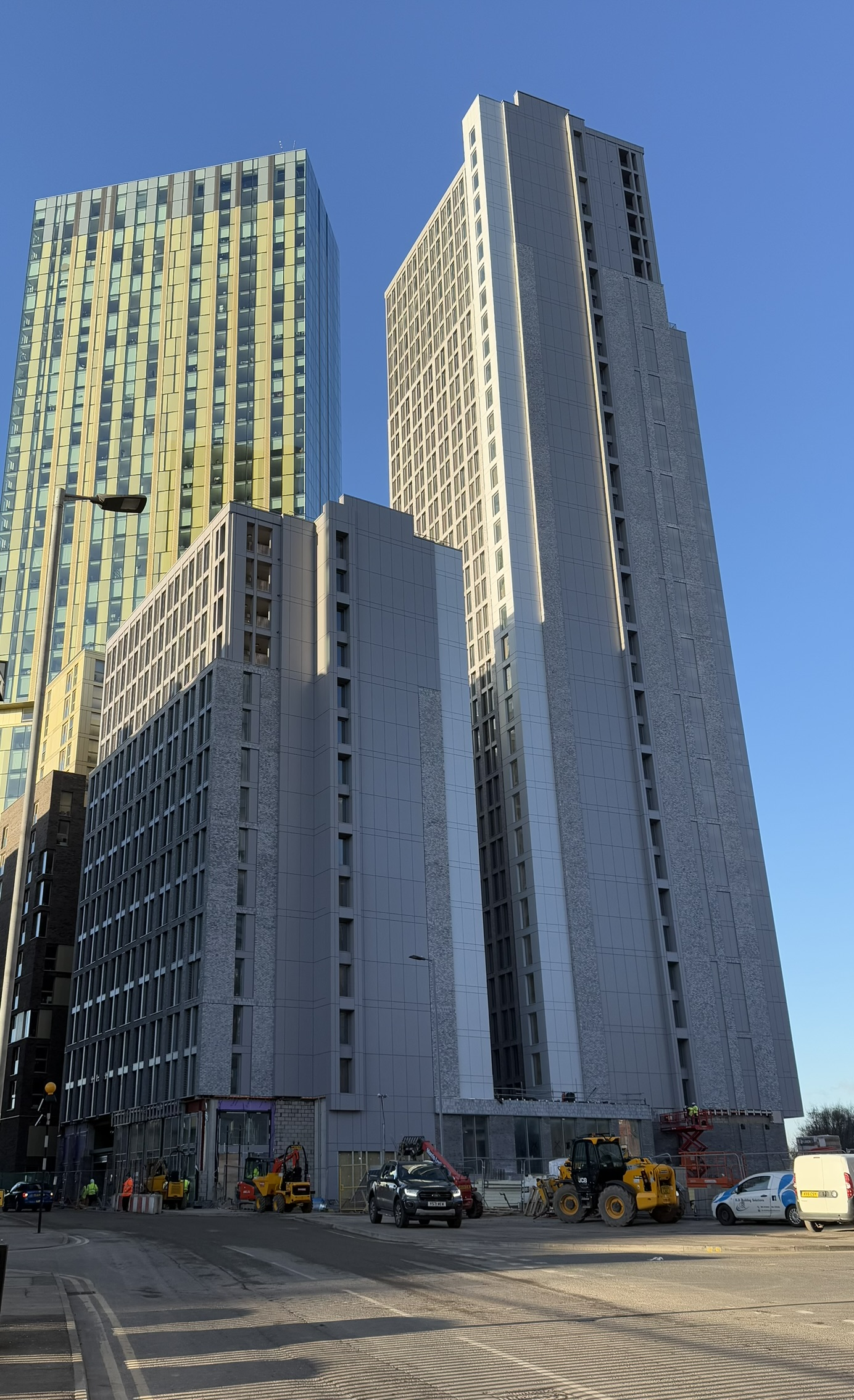
- The buildings in 2025

- Location within Greater Manchester
- Former names: The Residence Irwell Tower; The Residence Greengate Tower

General information
- Type: Residential high-rise
- Location: Greengate, Salford, England
- Coordinates: 53.48710°N 2.24700°W
- Construction started: 2017; 9 years ago
- Completed: 2025; 1 year ago
- Cost: £85 million
- Owner: Legacie Developments

Height
- Height: North Tower: 107 m (349 ft); South Tower: 50 m (163 ft)

Technical details
- Floor count: North Tower: 35; South Tower: 16

Design and construction
- Architect: Jeffrey Bell Architects / Falconer Chester Hall

Other information
- Number of units: 300

Website
- embankmentexchange.co.uk

Embankment Exchange is a residential development in the Greengate area of Salford, England. It comprises 300 apartments across two buildings connected by a central podium: the 107-metre (349 ft) North Tower and 50 m (163 ft) South Tower. The buildings were designed by Jeffrey Bell Architects, and constructed between 2017 and 2025, with the schedule prolonged by several delays.

As of September 2026, the North Tower is the fifth-tallest building in Salford and the 26th-tallest in Greater Manchester.

== History ==
=== Planning ===
The planning application was submitted to Salford City Council in August 2015, and planning approval was granted in March 2016.

=== Construction ===
In 2017 Elliot Group commenced construction of the complex, then called The Residence, but progress was delayed the following year when main contractor Forrest went into administration. Work stalled again in 2020 pending the outcome of a wider fraud investigation, before restarting in February 2022 following the acquisition of the site by Legacie Developments, which renamed the project Embankment Exchange. Construction was initially expected to complete in 2023, and in October 2024 it was announced that completion was due by the end of the year. The buildings were completed in 2025.

== Facilities ==
The development includes a spa, a gym, a residents' lounge and a 24-hour concierge.

== Gallery ==
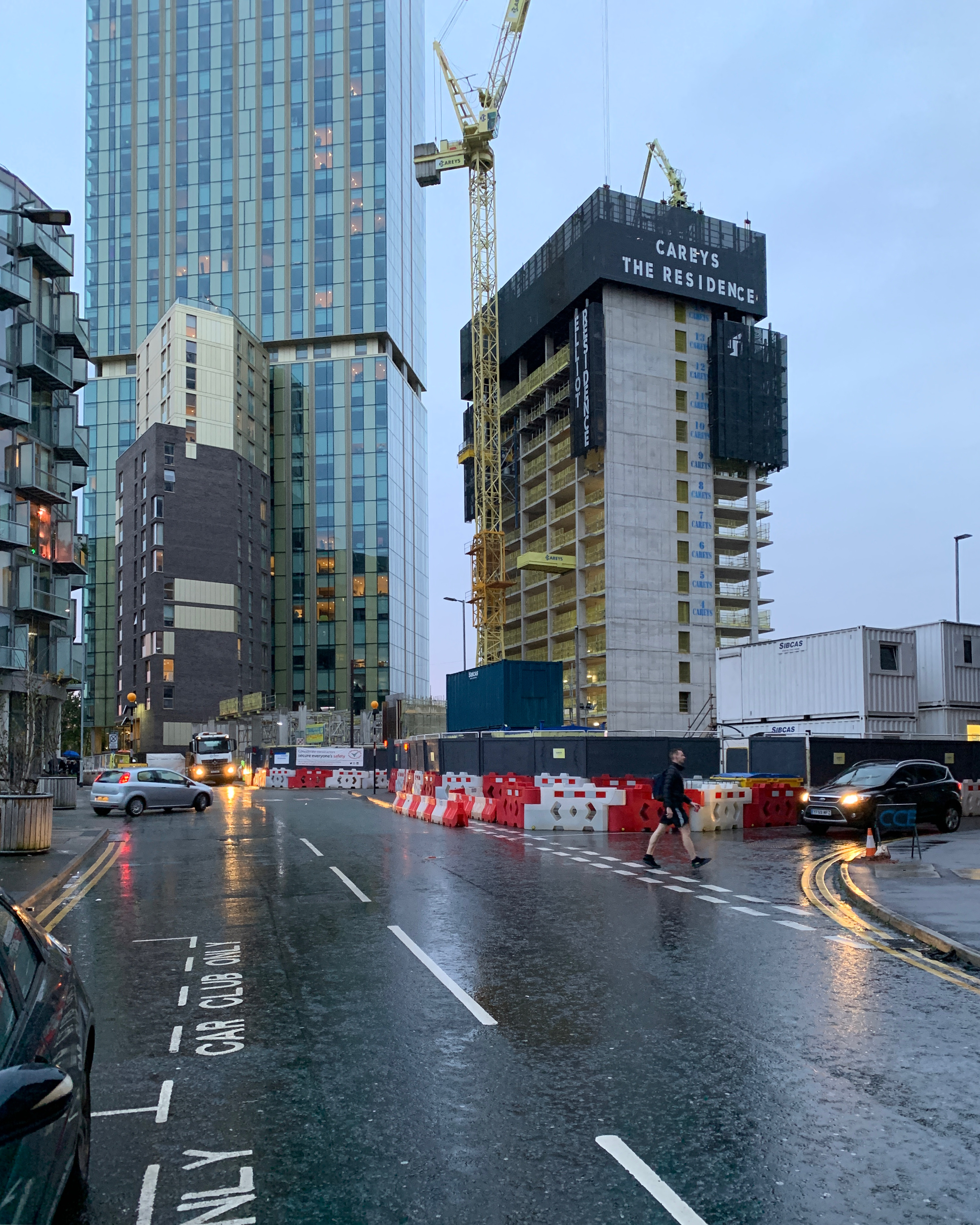
The Residence, under construction in October 2019

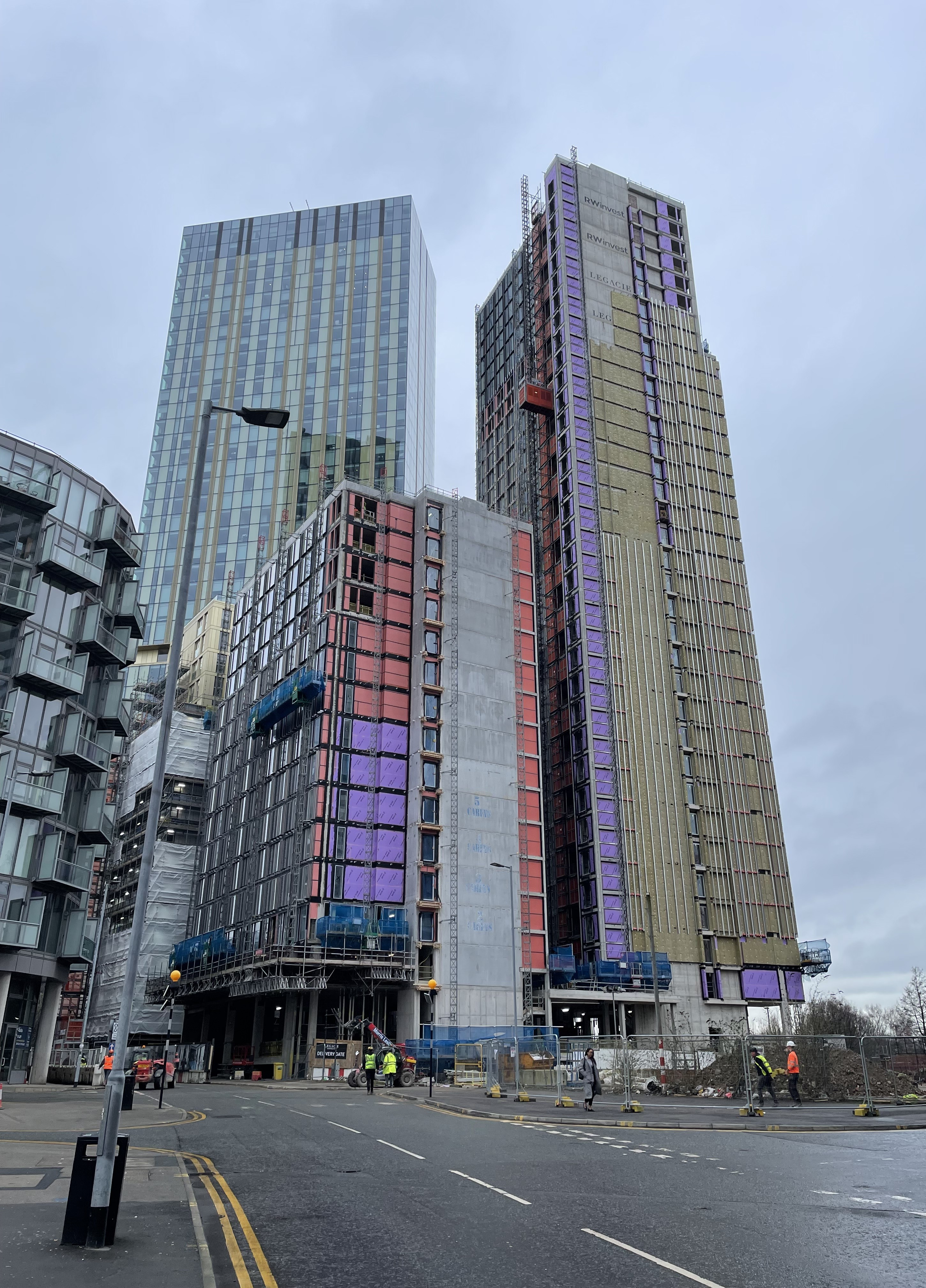
Embankment Exchange nearing completion in January 2024

== See also ==
- List of tallest buildings and structures in Greater Manchester
- List of tallest buildings in the United Kingdom
