= Albany Crown Tower =

General information
- Status: Approved
- Type: Hotel / Offices / Residential
- Coordinates: 53°28′44.4″N 2°14′2.4″W
- Construction started: 2027
- Estimated completion: Unknown
- Cost: £83 million

Height
- Roof: 150 m (490 ft)

Technical details
- Floor count: 54

Design and construction
- Architect: Ian Simpson
- Developer: Albany Crown

The Albany Crown Tower (or the Crown Building) was a planned development on Aytoun and Auburn Streets in Manchester England. It would have fronted onto the Rochdale Canal not far from Piccadilly Station and been one of the tallest buildings in Manchester projected to cost £83 million. It was designed by Ian Simpson, for Albany Crown.

Planning permission was given in 2005 but construction never commenced and the developer entered administration in May 2010.

== History ==
The mixed-use tower's proposed height was 131 m (430 ft), it had 44 floors, providing 35,298.00 square metres of space. The ground floor comprised retail space, while floors 1 to 23 (140,000 square feet of space) would be a hotel and floors 24 to 41 residential, with a penthouse on the top two floors. In total there will be 237 flats. In May 2007, Albany proposed adding a further 10 storeys increasing its height to 160 m (525 ft). Adjoining the tower was a smaller, 11-storey structure, at 49 m (160 ft), with approximately 14,500 square metres of space to be occupied by retail and offices.

A planning application was submitted in February 2005. Albany then purchased the site in October 2005 for £6 million. Planning permission was approved on the 11 November 2005.

The site was occupied by five-storey offices designed by David Thomson in 1936 and built between 1948 and 1951 when the architect E H Montague Ebbs took over the project, and occupied by a Labour Exchange, part of the Department of Employment. It was proposed to be demolished in early 2006 but demolition started in 2014. A hotel run by Holiday Inn is currently under construction on the site.

The project stalled due to the failure of Albany Assets to sell apartments in its other developments.

Albany Crown entered administration in May 2010 and the construction of the hotel finally put paid to the chance of the skyscraper ever being constructed.
