= Oxygen Towers =

Residential high-rise in Manchester, England

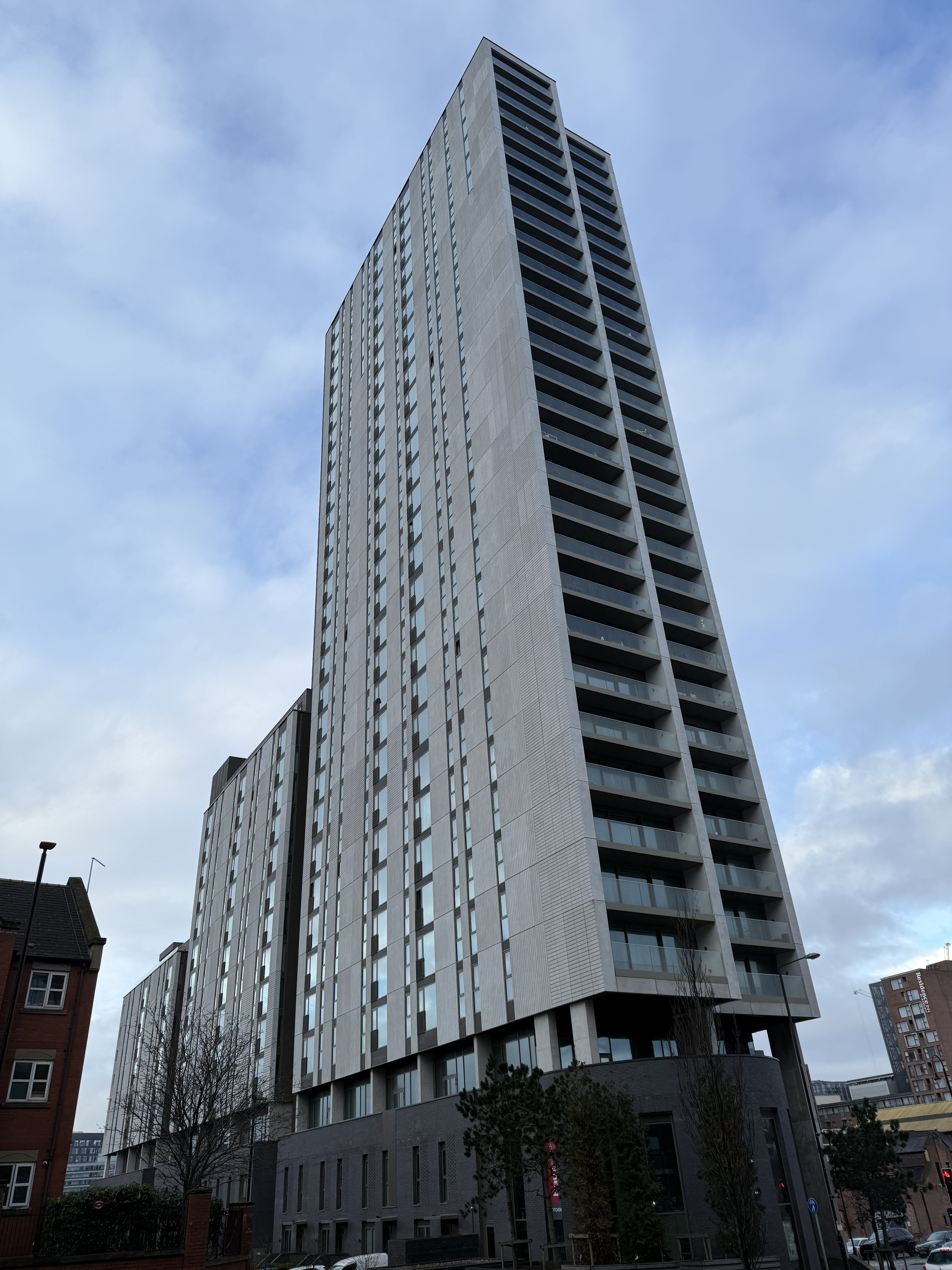
- The building in 2025

- Location within Greater Manchester
- Alternative names: Oxygen

General information
- Type: Residential high-rise
- Location: Store Street, Manchester, England
- Coordinates: 53.4803°N 2.2251°W
- Construction started: 2018
- Completed: 2021; 5 years ago
- Cost: £85 million
- Owner: Property Alliance Group

Height
- Height: Tower 1: 110 m (359 ft)

Technical details
- Floor count: Tower 1: 32; Tower 2: 16; Tower 3: 10
- Floor area: 379,485 sq ft (35,255.3 m^{2})

Design and construction
- Architect: Jon Matthews Architects (Note: Oxygen was designed by 5plus Architects, but it appears in Jon Matthews Architects' portfolio because Matthews, then a founding director of 5plus, led its early conception and remained publicly associated with key projects he originated there before establishing his own practice.)
- Main contractor: Russell WBHO

Other information
- Number of units: 372 (plus 12 townhouses)

Website
- oxygenmanchester.com

Oxygen Towers (also known as Oxygen) are a cluster of three individual but interlinked residential towers on Store Street in Manchester, England. Completed in 2021, the 110-metre (359 ft), 32-storey Tower 1 is the tallest element, with Towers 2 and 3 having 16 and 10 storeys respectively. The buildings were designed by Jon Matthews Architects and Tower 1 is the 24th-tallest building in Greater Manchester as of June 2026.

== History ==
=== Planning ===
Planning permission was originally granted in 2007 by Manchester City Council for a 35-storey tower by developer Time & Tide, before the company entered administration in 2008. Property Alliance Group acquired the site in 2015 and secured consent for a three‑tower scheme in March 2016. The development comprises 372 apartments and 12 townhouses across three towers of 32, 16 and 10 storeys, linked by two lift shafts.

=== Construction ===
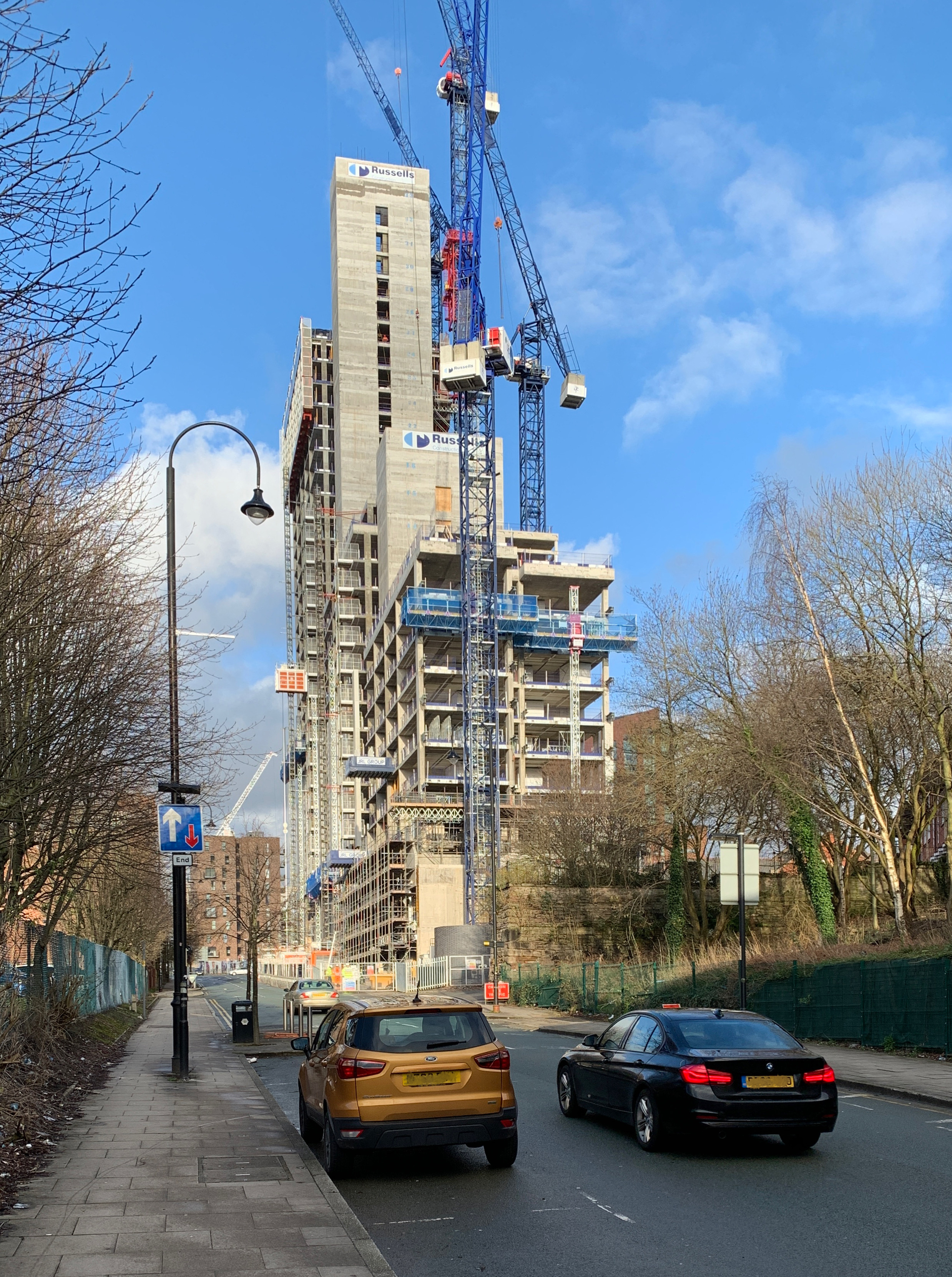
Oxygen Towers under construction in 2020

Construction of Oxygen Towers was started in 2018 by contractor Russell WBHO, topped out in 2020, and completed in 2021. It is located on a triangular site where Store Street meets Great Ancoats Street, with the third elevation facing onto the sloped Millbank Street. The change in levels means that the tallest part of the building, Tower 1, has two basement floors while Towers 2 and 3 have just one.

== Facilities ==
Oxygen Towers includes a spa with a 25-metre (82 ft) pool, a gym, spin and yoga studio, cinema room, and residents' lounge.

== See also ==
- List of tallest buildings and structures in Greater Manchester
- List of tallest buildings in the United Kingdom
