= Circle Square Manchester =

Area of Manchester, England

Coordinates: 53.4731°N 2.2384°W

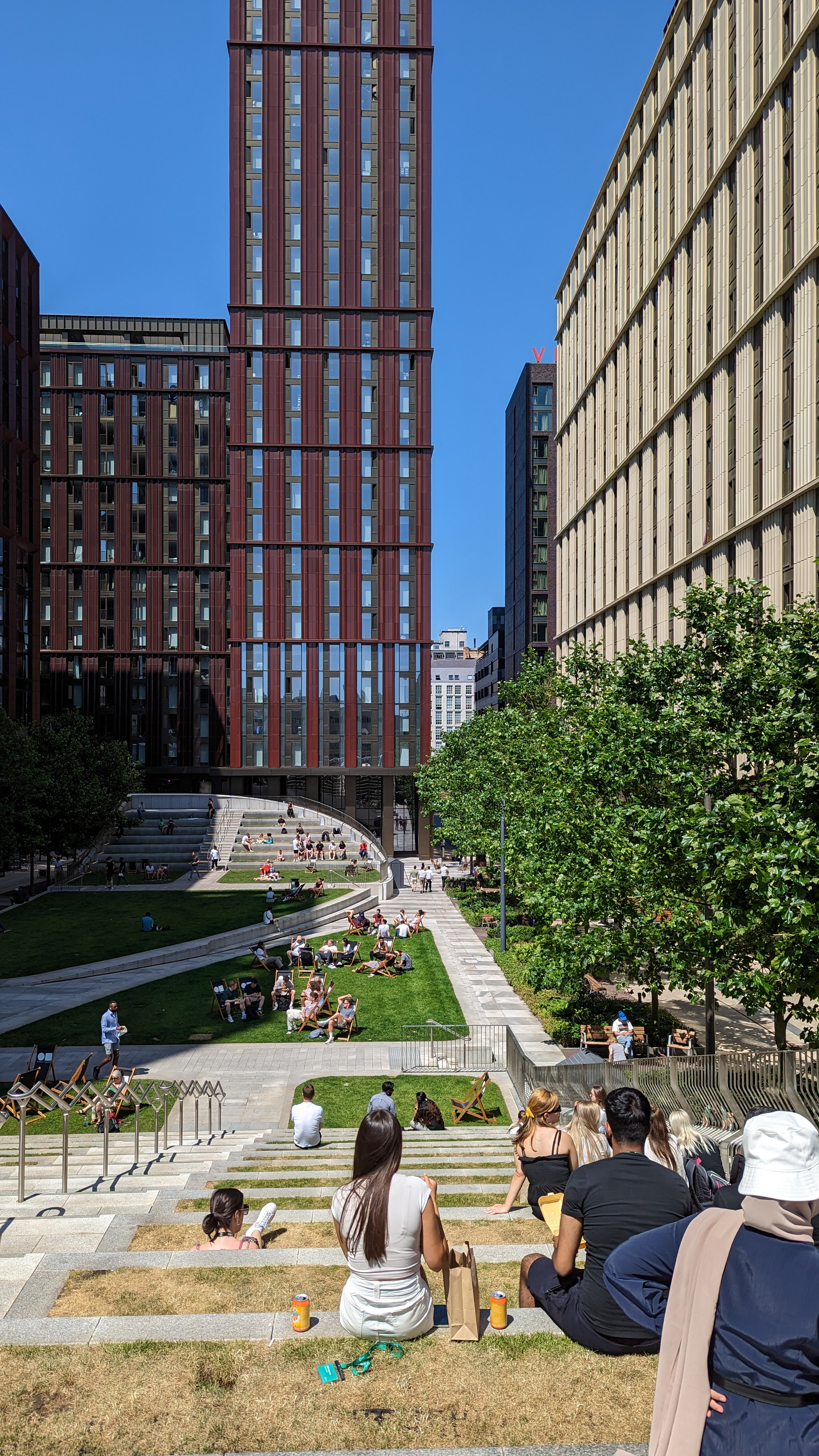
Symphony Park in Circle Square

Circle Square is an area of Manchester City Centre on Oxford Road, in North West England. Circle Square is a 2.4 million sq ft development of commercial buildings, residential, retail, leisure space and a large public realm. Circle Square is a joint venture between Vita Group and Bruntwood SciTech. It is estimated to have cost £850 million.

== Present day ==
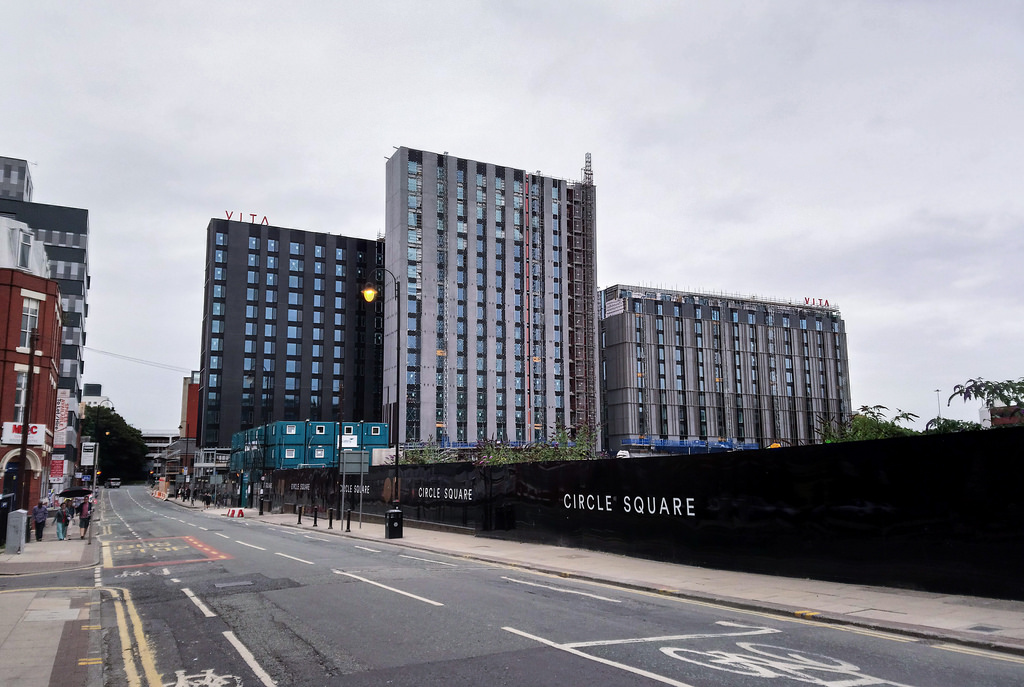
Circle Square in 2017

Hatch, a Pop-up retail area is in Circle Square. Opened in March 2018, Hatch is a curated space for independent traders and retailers, offering short term, flexible leases. In June 2019 Hatch expanded from 10 to 30 units. Hatch currently houses over 30 independent businesses.

The Manchester Tech Incubator is in Circle Square.

The housing and accommodation at Circle Square is provided by Vita Group. Vita Student consists of student accommodation and Vita Living provides private rented apartments. The first two Vita Student buildings opened in September 2017 and the third in September 2019. The three buildings contain 1,100 apartments.

The second phase of development opened in 2021 and includes Vita Living East which opened in January 2021, and Vita Living North which opened in September 2021.

The two commercial buildings, No.1 and No.2 Circle Square, opened in March 2021. No.1 Circle Square stands at 12 storeys high, while No.2 Circle Square is at 16 storeys.

The commercial buildings' tenants include Hewlett Packard Enterprise (HPE), Hilti, Mills & Reeve and Autocab, part of Uber.

The commercial and residential buildings surround ‘Symphony Park’, designed by landscape architects Planit. and includes 187 semi-mature trees and over 1,000 plants, flowers and shrubs.

== History ==
Circle Square occupies the former BBC Oxford Road site. The site was acquired by Bruntwood in March 2015 with plans to transform the site into a commercially led mixed-use development scheme. Following approval of the masterplan by Manchester City Council, Vita Group was chosen as joint venture partner to deliver the residential element of the scheme.

== Future developments ==
Plans are in progress to build a third commercial building, No.3 Circle Square, which will stand at 14 storeys. It is expected that construction work on No.3 Circle Square will be completed in Q2 2025.
