= Co-living =

Type of residential living model

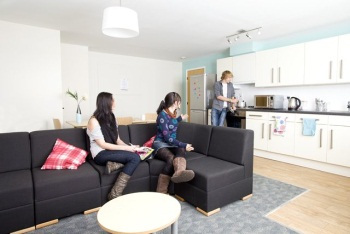
A shared kitchen in student accommodation at the University of Exeter in England

Co-living is a residential community living model that accommodates three or more biologically unrelated people living in the same dwelling unit. Coliving has seen a noticeable increase in popularity in recent years globally, concentrated in areas experiencing affordable housing crises.

Studies have concluded coliving enables a more sustainable lifestyle due to shared resources, allowing each individual to consume less energy, water, and space.

== History ==
Sometime between 1933 and 1934, shared living space was designed in north London called 'Isokon', which was established by Wells Coats. It offered similar amenities, such as a shared communal space, workspace, and things such as a laundry area. It was seen as a part of a greater effort during the intra-war period between World War I and World War II by the Modern Architectural Research Group (MARS) to advance modernist discourse in Britain. Another effort to do this idea was in 1937 by Maxwell Fry (a founding member of MARS) and Elizabeth Denby and was called Kensal House.

Co-living spaces began to emerge in part due to rising property prices. Attempts to establish co-living businesses were made in 2014 and 2015 by companies including 13 and Techsquat, but the attempts failed. Later more successful efforts were made to establish co-living businesses. Relaxations on the minimal rental period for private homes were made in June 2018 from six months to three resulted in a boost for the industry. Cities such as New York City have created incentives for co-living companies to build affordable housing in the city.

=== Usage ===
Co-living appeals particularly to millennials due to rising property prices. Residents of co-living spaces in Singapore typically range between the ages of 19 and 40 years. They are typically employees of startups, entrepreneurs, or students. High student loan costs are also a factor. From 2005 to 2015, there was a 39% increase for millennials living with housemates. The rise in co-living and similar housing was also impacted by the 2008 financial crisis.

=== Impact ===
Co-living has grown in popularity in cities such as New York City and London. A Bloomberg article cited "adult dorms" such as co-living facilities as one of the "eight social trends told us about America's economy in 2018." Hotelier Ian Schrager claimed that co-living spaces were "blurring the distinction between residential and hotels" due in part to differing sensibilities between millennials and previous generations.
