= Beetham Tower =

Beetham Tower can refer to these high-rise buildings in the UK, owned by, constructed for, or named after the Beetham Organization:

- 10 Holloway Circus, also known as Beetham Tower, Birmingham
- Beetham Tower, Liverpool
- One Blackfriars, originally known as Beetham Tower, London
- Beetham Tower, Manchester, also known as the Hilton Tower
- West Tower also known as Beetham Tower West, Liverpool
