= Rachel Haugh =

English architect

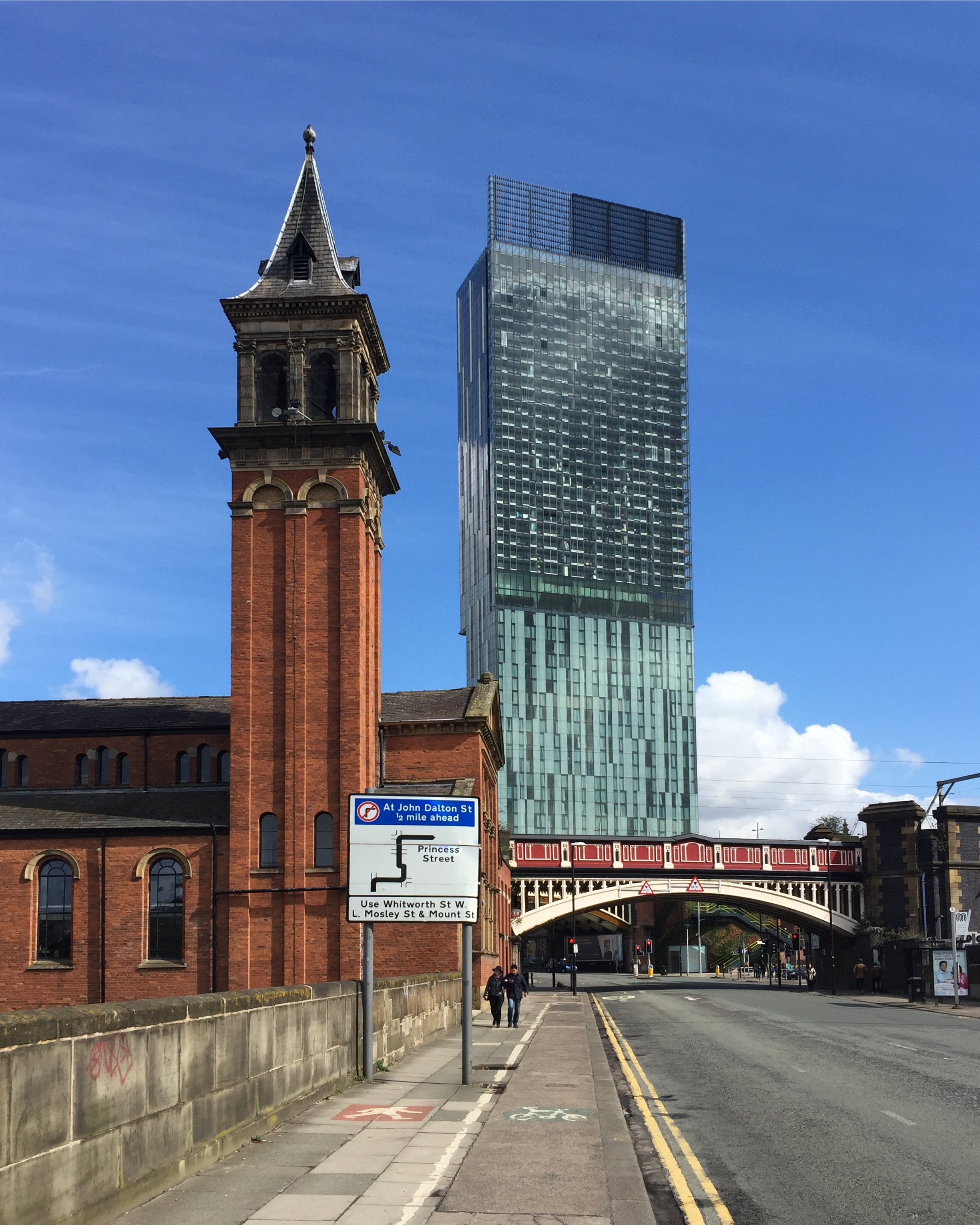
Beetham Tower, Manchester

Rachel Haugh is an English architect who co-founded SimpsonHaugh and Partners with Ian Simpson in 1987. Her practice operates in Manchester and London. Haugh was shortlisted for the Woman Architect of the Year Award in 2015.

Haugh attended Marple Hall School in Manchester and studied architecture at the University of Bath.

Haugh worked on the Beetham Tower in Manchester, a landmark 47-storey mixed use skyscraper which was completed in 2006. She also worked on One Blackfriars, a mixed-use development at No. 1 Blackfriars Road in Bankside, London, known as The Vase due to its shape, which completed in 2018. Haugh has also worked on the redevelopment of Battersea Power Station and the overhaul of Granada Studios in Manchester.

Her clients include the Beetham Organisation, Berkeley Group Holdings, Downing Developments, Manchester City Council, Treasury Holdings, Urban Splash, University of Manchester and University College London.
