= Beetham (disambiguation) =

Beetham may refer to:

== Places ==
In England

- Beetham, Cumbria

In Trinidad and Tobago

- Beetham Estate Gardens, a neighbourhood in Port of Spain
- Beetham Highway, a major highway

== People ==
- Bentley Beetham (1886–1963), British mountaineer, ornithologist and photographer
- Bruce Beetham (1936–1997), New Zealand academic and politician
- Charles Beetham (1914–1997), American middle-distance runner
- David Beetham (1938–2022), British social theorist
- Edward Beetham (1905–1979), Governor of Trinidad and Tobago
- George Beetham (1840–1915), New Zealand politician and alpinist
- Isabella Beetham (1750 to 1754–1825), British silhouette artist
- Michael Beetham (1923–2015), Marshal of the Royal Air Force

== See also ==
- Beetham Organization, a property development and investment company
- Beetham Tower (disambiguation), various British high-rise buildings financed and owned by the Beetham Organization
