= Beetham Tower, Liverpool =

Residential apartment building in the British city of Liverpool

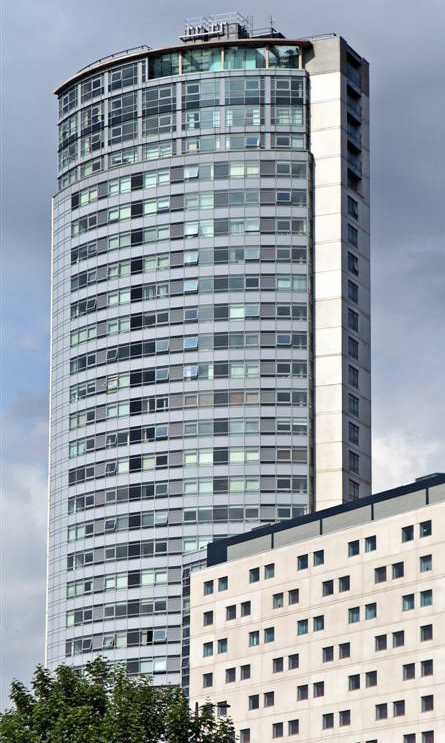
- Interactive map of the Beetham Tower, Liverpool area

General information
- Status: Completed
- Location: 111 Old Hall Street, Liverpool, England, United Kingdom
- Coordinates: 53.4111°N 2.9966°W
- Construction started: 2002
- Completed: 2004
- Opening: 2004

Height
- Roof: 90 m (300 ft)

Technical details
- Floor count: 29

Design and construction
- Architect: Ian Simpson
- Developer: Beetham Organization
- Main contractor: Carillion

Beetham Tower, Liverpool, is a residential apartment building in the British city of Liverpool. Its close neighbour and the tallest building in Liverpool, the West Tower, was also developed by the Beetham Organization.

It is named after the developers, Beetham Organization, was built by Carillion and was completed in early 2004. It is 90 metres (295 ft) tall and has 29 floors. The tower abuts the Radisson Blu Hotel, Liverpool. It lies alongside the River Mersey and the upper floors offer views of the Welsh mountains.

== See also ==
Three other UK towers share the same name:

- Beetham Tower, Birmingham
- Beetham Tower, Manchester
- Beetham Tower, London
