= Ian Simpson =

Ian Simpson may refer to:

- Ian Simpson (architect) (born c. 1956), English architect
  - Ian Simpson Architects, an English architecture practice established in 1987 by Ian Simpson and Rachel Haugh
- Ian Simpson (motorcyclist) (born 1970), motorcycle road racer from Scotland
- Ian Simpson (long jumper), British athlete and champion at the 1993 UK Athletics Championships
- Kevin Abstract (Clifford Ian Simpson; middle name preference, born 1996), American rapper
