= River Street =

River Street may refer to:

- River Street (Erie Railroad station), a former railroad station for the Erie Railroad
- River Street (film), a 1996 Australian film
- River Street, Hackensack, part of County Route 503, New Jersey
- River Street (Savannah, Georgia)
- River Street Historic District (New Haven, Connecticut)

== See also ==
- River Street Tower, Manchester, UK
