= No. 1 Deansgate =

Residential building in Manchester, United Kingdom

Coordinates: 53°29′01″N 2°14′44″W

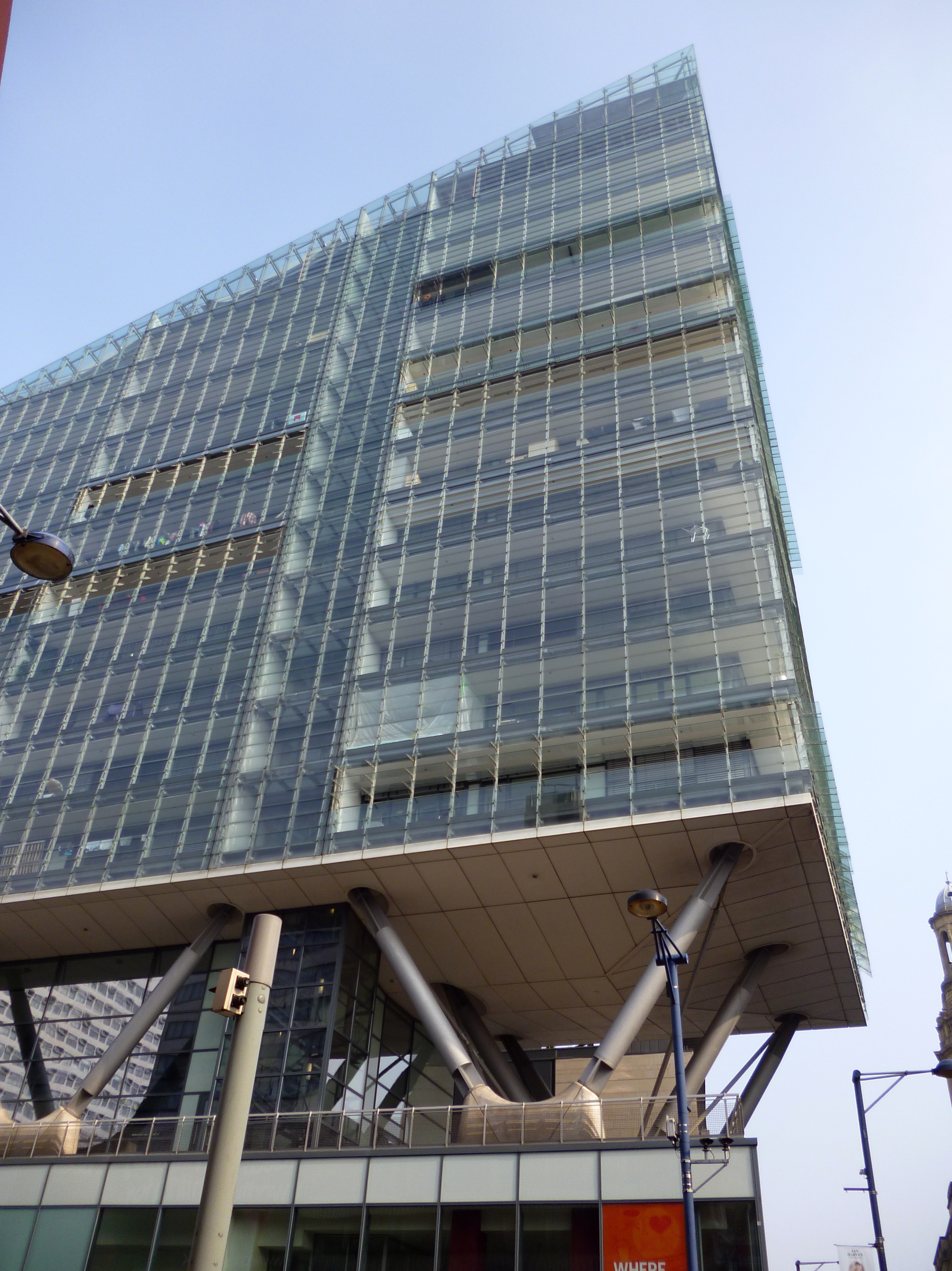

General information
- Type: Residential
- Architectural style: Post modern
- Location: Manchester city centre, Manchester, England
- Construction started: 2000
- Opened: 2002

Height
- Height: 62 m (203 ft)

Design and construction
- Architect: Ian Simpson
- Architecture firm: SimpsonHaugh and Partners

No. 1 Deansgate is the name and location of a medium-rise apartment building in central Manchester, England. It is the tallest all-steel residential building in the United Kingdom, and one of the most expensive addresses in Manchester. The building was completed in 2002, and is situated at the north end of Deansgate close to Manchester Cathedral.

== Background ==
The building, characterised by a distinctive glass frontage and sloping roof, was built as part of the major redevelopment project that took place in the years following the 1996 IRA bombing. No. 1 was designed by SimpsonHaugh and Partners, with engineers Martin Stockley Associates (now Stockley). Simpson's designs now dominate either end of Deansgate, with No. 1 and the equally imposing Beetham Tower forming prominent glass 'bookends' to the thoroughfare.

== Design and construction ==
The 62 m (203 ft) high building consists of 14 floors which provide 84 apartments, including eight penthouses. The apartments are above a retail level, 16 m (52 ft) high, and are supported by raking steel tubular columns in a manner reminiscent of Rotterdam's De Brug building. The raking columns allow the small close centred columns of the apartments to be channelled into large, widely spaced, columns of the retail section. This is due to apartments tolerating many closely spaced columns, whereas retail areas cannot. The comparatively lightweight structure is principally constructed of steel, the skeleton balanced by precise weight ratios to ensure its stability.

The external treatment is juxtaposed to the concrete Brutalist architecture of the late 20th century. On the upper floors an almost cubist form of architecture is suggested. The 20th-century appearance is further offset by louvred glass sloping walls.

Critics of the design have suggested the building has the air of a municipal, public, civil building.

Four penthouse suites were sold for £1.5m each in 2002, the most expensive residences sold in Manchester at the time.
