= Panoramic (restaurant) =

Restaurant in Liverpool, England

Coordinates: 53.410°N 2.997°W

Panoramic 34
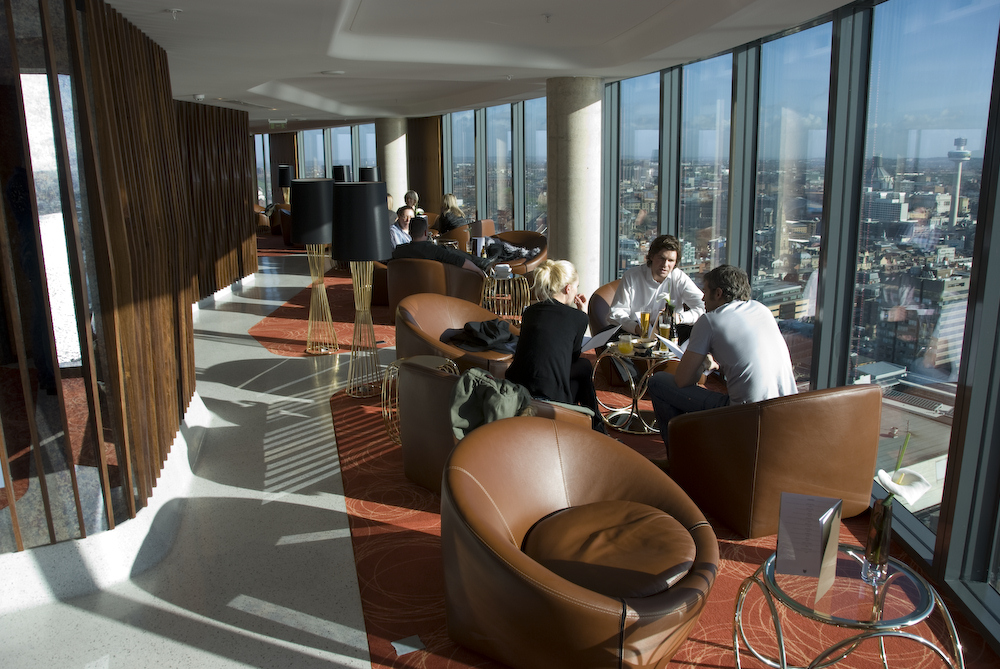
- The lounge area during its opening week
- Interactive map of Panoramic 34

Restaurant information
- Established: 1 February 2008
- Location: Brook Street, Liverpool, Merseyside, L3 9PJ, England
- Website: www.panoramic34.com

Panoramic 34 is a restaurant and bar located on the 34th floor of West Tower, Liverpool. It is 100 metres (330 ft) above ground and claims to be 'one of the UK's highest restaurants' with views as far away as North Wales.

Original plans for the building did not include a restaurant, which was only considered and planned for late in the tower's construction period. Shortly prior to opening, the tower's developer the Beetham Organisation claimed that the restaurant would then be "the highest in the UK", a claim which was also reported by the Liverpool Echo. However, a review published by The Independent in 2004 indicated that Rhodes Twenty Four, which had opened in 2003, was around 342 feet (104 m) from the ground, slightly surpassing the height of Panoramic 34.

The restaurant opened on 1st February 2008 and took 450 bookings during its first day. A launch party was held the night before and was attended by celebrities including Liz McClarnon, Andrew Lancel and Dean Sullivan. It was designed by Richard Eastwood of R2 Architects.

In February 2025, the restaurant was purchased by Italian brothers Paolo and Donato Cillo, who already operated hospitality venues in Duke Street and Lark Lane.
