= Bog Standard Gallery =

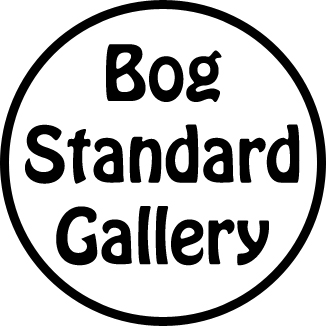
- Established: 2007
- Location: United Kingdom
- Curator: Melanie Boda (nee Warner)
- Website: www.bogstandardgallery.com

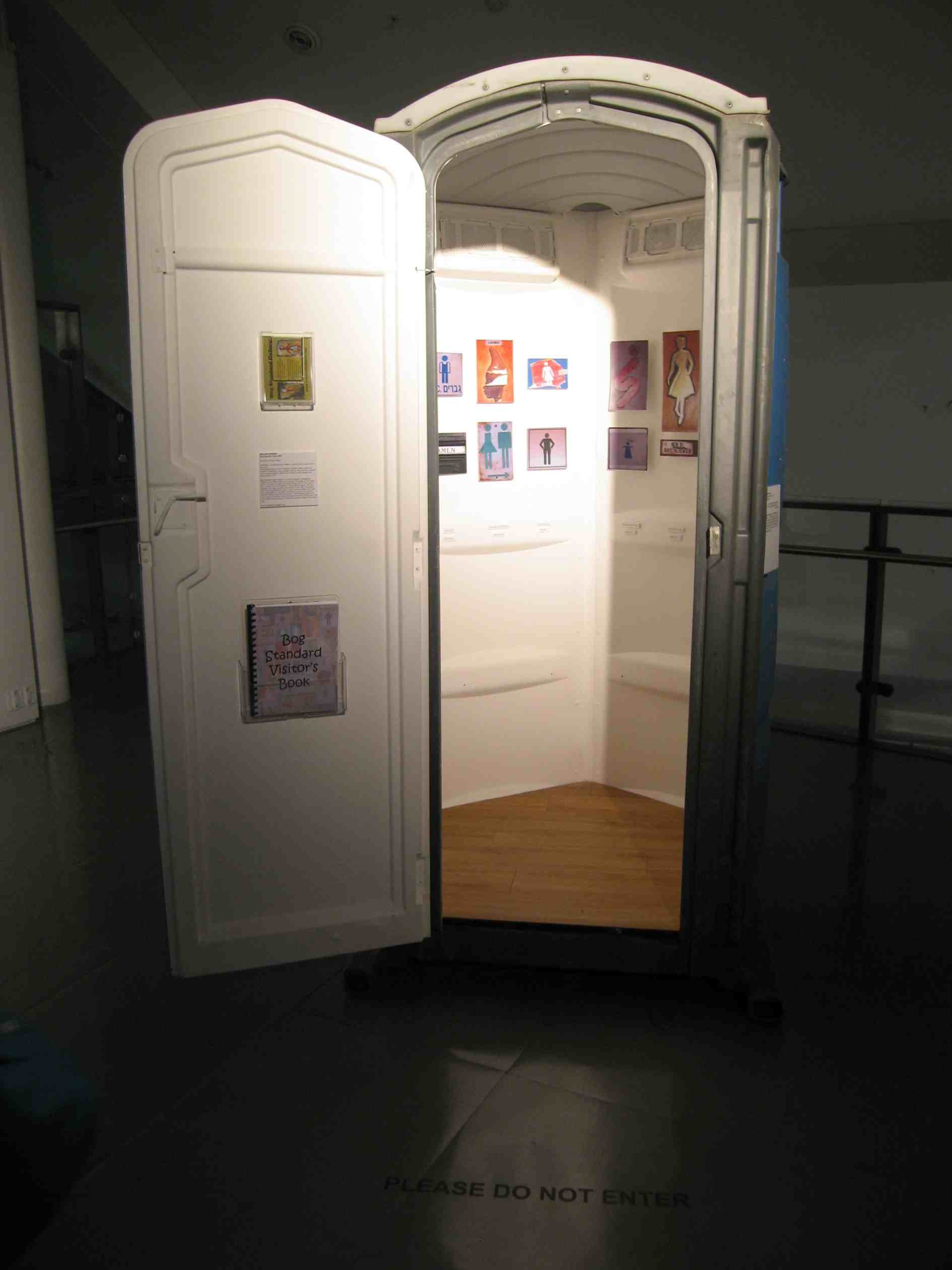
Bog Standard Gallery

Bog Standard Gallery was previously a portable toilet cubicle and is believed to be one of the smallest "art galleries" in the world.

The gallery, complete with white walls and an oak floor, the piece of installation art mimicking a traditional gallery space, was created and curated by UK-based artist, Melanie Boda (née Warner) in 2007. Measuring just over one metre squared, the piece was created as part of Melanie Boda's degree course in Interactive Arts at Manchester Metropolitan University gaining her first class honours.

Bog Standard Gallery was created to house photographs from Melanie Boda's 'Bog Standard Signs' series, a collection of photographs of toilet signs from around the world. The collection spans thousands of images of the symbols used to depict 'male' and 'female' on toilet doors from around the globe. The photograph collection began as part of Melanie Boda's research towards her dissertation in which she investigated whether cultural differences are portrayed in the design of toilet signs in different parts of the world. The original study was based on the toilet signs in the United Kingdom, as a comparison with the toilet signs in Israel. As Boda travelled further, and the collection of images grew, the research has developed. Melanie now receives images of toilet signs from people around the world who have since been interested in the project and want to make a contribution to the growing collection. Bog Standard Gallery exhibits 24 photographs from the collection at a time and the images are frequently changed to incorporate new signs added to the collection.

Bog Standard Gallery has been touring around the United Kingdom since its creation in 2007 (receiving its 50,000th visitor in 2009), and has been seen in a number of galleries and public spaces. Exhibition venues have included Urbis in Manchester, artsdepot in north London, and The Toilet Gallery in Kingston-upon-Thames, Surrey. The cubicle was on display at the Watford Museum in Hertfordshire, throughout August 2013.
