= SimpsonHaugh =

English architecture practice

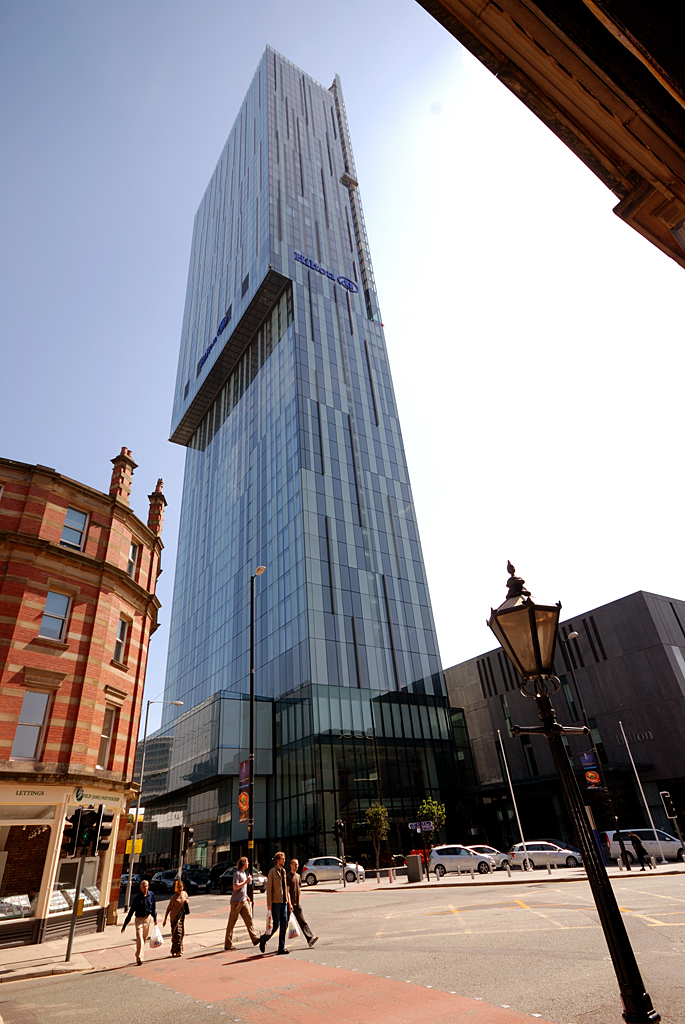
- Exterior detail of the Beetham Tower, Manchester

Practice information
- Key architects: Ian Simpson; Rachel Haugh
- Founded: 1987
- Location: Manchester and London, England; United Kingdom

Significant works and honors
- Projects: Masterplan of Manchester City Centre following the 1996 Manchester bombing

Website
- https://www.simpsonhaugh.com/

SimpsonHaugh (formerly Ian Simpson Architects) is an English architecture practice established in 1987 by Ian Simpson and Rachel Haugh. The practice has offices in London and Manchester. In 2014, the practice re-branded as SimpsonHaugh & Partners.

== Notable Projects ==
- 4 Angel Square, Manchester (2018-2023)
- Deansgate Square, Manchester (2016–21)
- 1 Blackfriars, London (2014–18)
- River Street Tower, Manchester (2018-20)
- Holbrook House London (2017–19)
- City Village, Belgrade Plaza Coventry (2014–17)
- 1 Spinningfields, Manchester (2015–17)
- Battersea Power Station Phase 1, London (2013–16)
- Verde, Newcastle (2014–16)
- First Street development, Manchester (2013–15)
- The View, Newcastle (2006–15)
- Manchester Central Library and Manchester Town Hall Extension restoration, Manchester (2010–14)
- Beetham Tower, Manchester, England (2003–06)
- Holloway Circus Tower, Birmingham, England (2006)
- Shudehill Interchange, Manchester, England (2003)
- Urbis, Manchester, England (1998–2002)
- No. 1 Deansgate, Manchester, England (2002)
- Parkway Gate, Manchester
- Gallowgate, Newcastle
- Merchants Warehouse restoration, Castlefield, Manchester (1993–97)

== Awards ==
- The International Property Awards, Best Mixed Use Architecture London and UK: One Black Friars (2021)
- Newcastle Lord Mayor's Design Awards : The View – People's Choice and New Building categories at the bi-annual Newcastle Lord Mayor's Design Award. (2015)
- Newcastle Lord Mayor's Design Awards : Newcastle University Business School (NUBS) & Central Link, Downing Plaza – New Building Newcastle Lord Mayor's Design Award. (2011)
- RIBA International Design Competition Winner : The National Wildflower Centre (2009)
- MSA Design Awards – Overall Winner: Parkway Gate, Manchester (2009)
- RIBA National Award Winner : Hilton Tower (2008)
- Manchester Confidential – Best New Building : Parkway Gate (2008)
- Council on Tall Buildings and Urban Habitat Best Tall Building – Award Winner : The Beetham Hilton Tower, Manchester (2007)
- RIBA Award Winner : Manchester Transport Interchange (2007)
- RIBA Award Winner : The Manchester Museum, Manchester (2004)
- RIBA Award Winner : No. 1 Deansgate, Manchester (2003)
- RIBA Housing Design Awards : Designer Ian Simpson Architects (2002)
