= Cathedral Gardens =

Open space in Manchester, England

Coordinates: 53°29′08″N 2°14′34″W

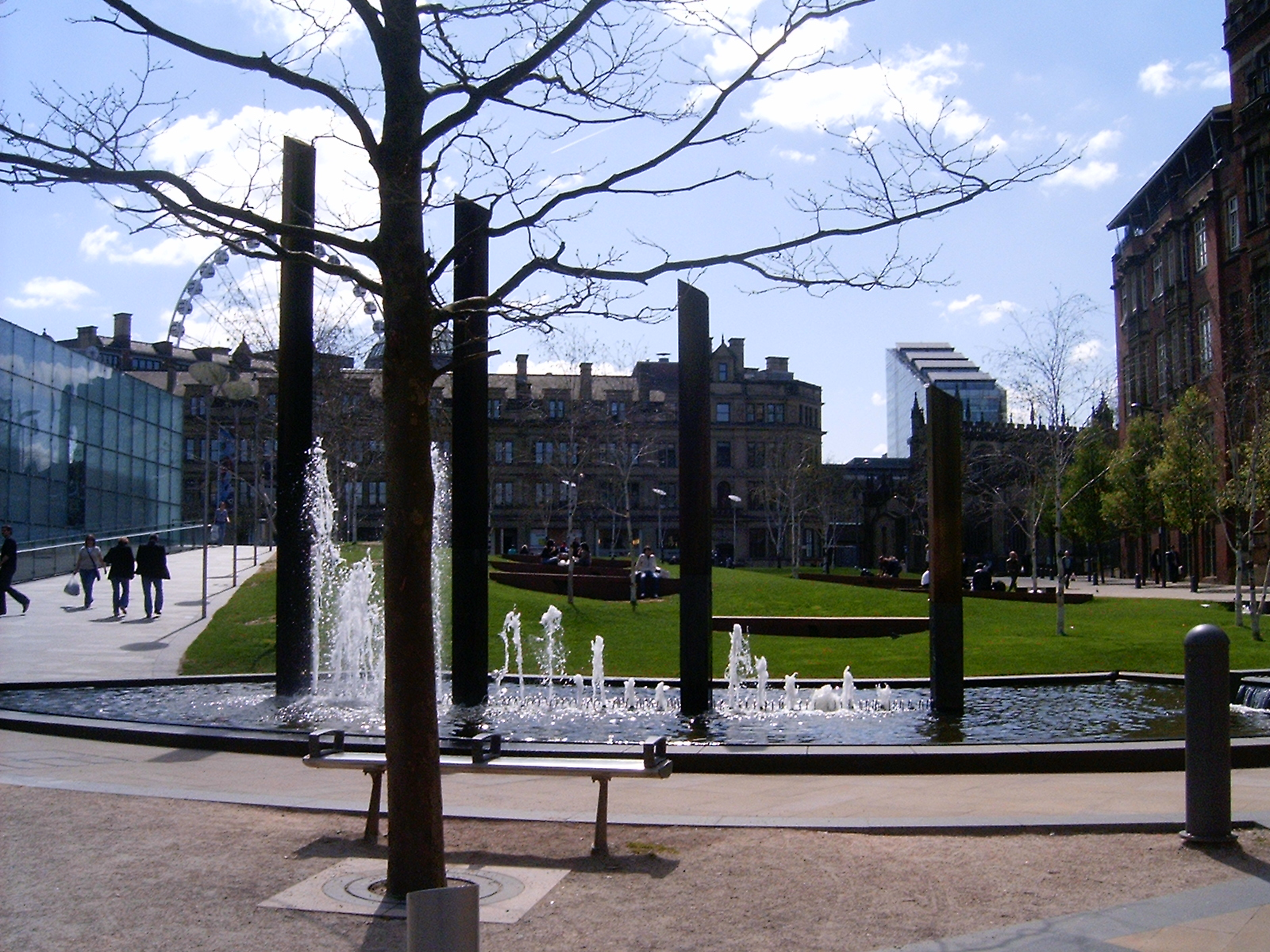
Cathedral Gardens, Manchester

Cathedral Gardens is an open space in Manchester city centre, in North West England. It is bounded by Victoria railway station to the north, Chetham's School of Music to the west, the perimeter of Manchester Cathedral and the Corn Exchange on Fennel Street to the south and Urbis to the east.

Cathedral Gardens comprises wide areas of grassy plots, surrounded by paved walking areas and stylised concrete sitting areas. On the west side, is a short water feature.

== Earliest history ==
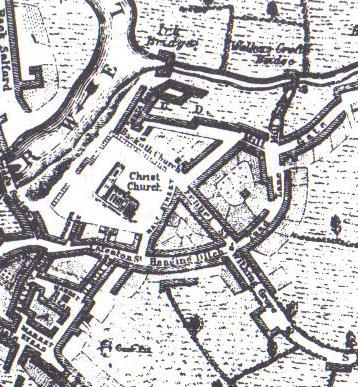
Area around the cathedral in 1650

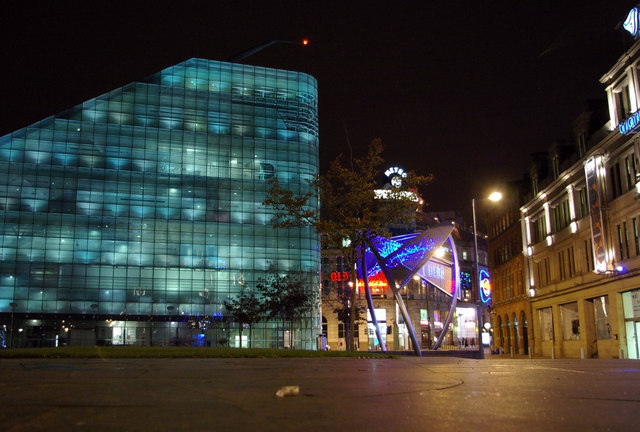
Cathedral Gardens and Urbis at night

Until the Industrial Revolution, Manchester was little more than a small market town, and the town was centred on the cathedral. The area where Cathedral Gardens now stands was enclosed by small cottages. During the Industrial Revolution Manchester expanded rapidly, and its centre shifted further south. Cathedral Gardens is overlooked by Chetham's Library, where Karl Marx and Friedrich Engels wrote.

After Victoria railway station was built in the 1860s, the site housed travellers, hotels and shops until urban planning in the 1980s, demolished the hotel which faced south on Fennel Street and the Corn Exchange. The site was used as a car park until the regeneration of Manchester city centre.

== Manchester IRA bombing ==
The Provisional IRA planted bombs on mainland British cities for thirty years. Manchester was targeted in the 1990s, which culminated in the Manchester IRA bombing on 15 June 1996.

The bomb exploded on a Saturday morning while Manchester was hosting the 1996 UEFA European Football Championship and was the largest bombing on British soil. It created devastation for half a mile around the explosion site. The Marks and Spencer store was damaged beyond repair but nobody was killed.

== Regeneration ==
After the 1996 bombing, the government, granted Manchester City Council several million pounds to redevelop the most damaged sites in the city. After an international competition, several architects were charged with creating an accessible open space linking St Ann’s Square to the cathedral. After the completion of the new Marks and Spencer flagship store (then the largest in the world) and the Urbis gallery, Cathedral Gardens was opened to the public.

== Manchester Arena bombing ==
At around 22:35 on 22 May 2017 a bombing at the nearby Manchester Arena killed 22 people and injured at least 59.
