= The Sentinels =

Coordinates: 52.47449°N 1.90132°W

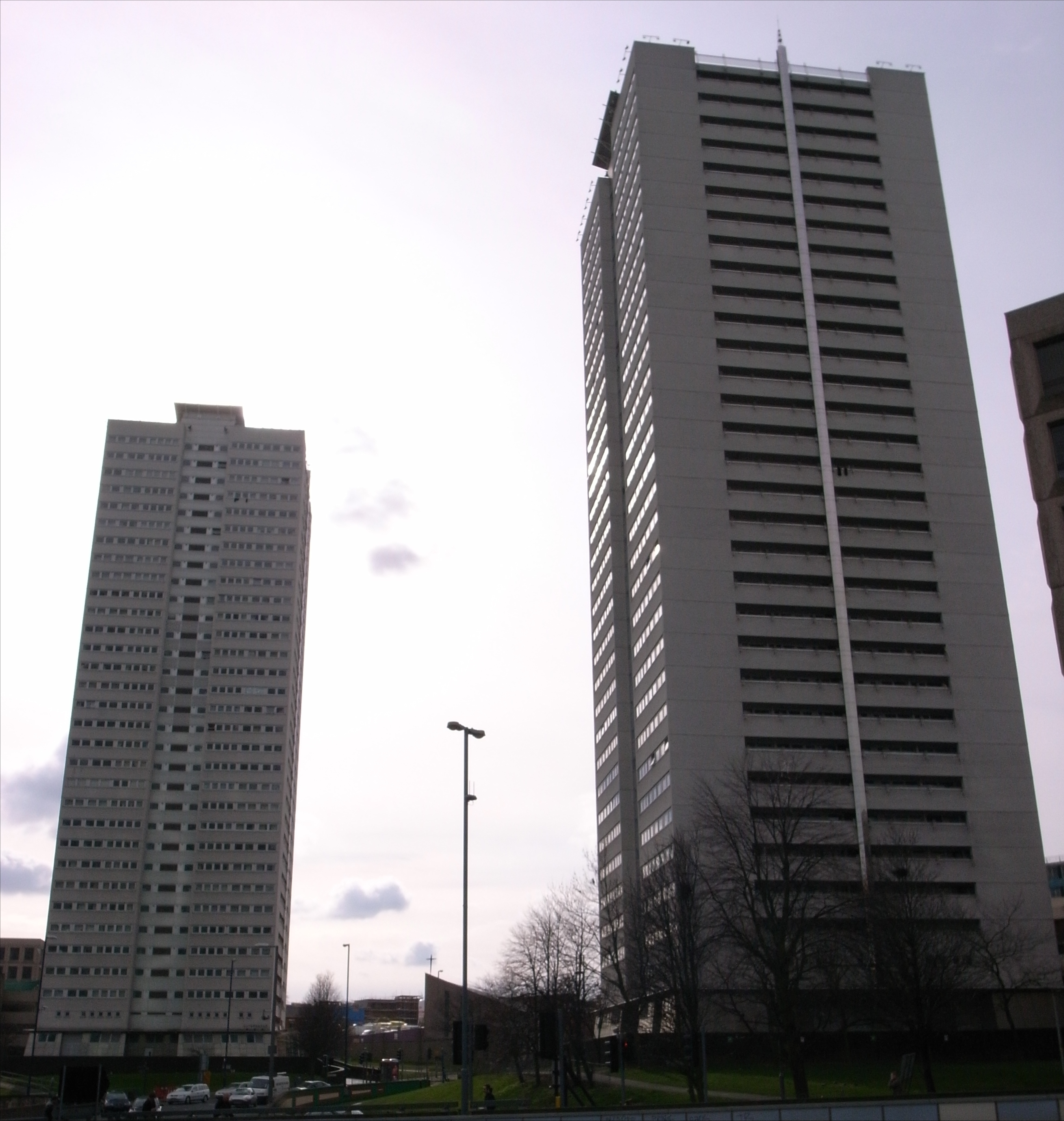

General information
- Type: Residential
- Architectural style: Modernist
- Location: Holloway Circus, Birmingham, England
- Completed: 1971
- Height: 90m

Technical details
- Floor count: 31

Design and construction
- Architect(s): Bryant's Ltd

The Sentinels are two 90-metre-tall (300 ft) residential tower blocks on Holloway Head in Birmingham, England. The two towers, called Clydesdale Tower and Cleveland Tower, are both 31 storeys tall and were part of a major regeneration and council home building scheme following World War II which in the 1960s and 1970s saw the construction of hundreds of tower blocks. Originally built and operated by the City of Birmingham, the buildings were part of a stock transfer from Birmingham local authority to Optima Community Association in 1999, and today the buildings are owned by Citizen housing association (itself an amalgamation of several West Midlands housing associations). The Sentinels were the tallest purely residential tower blocks in the city until the completion of the 102-metre-tall (335 ft) skyscraper Bank Tower 2 in 2019. They are also surpassed by the 132-metre-tall (433 ft) residential tower known as The Mercian located on Broad Street with 42 floors.

== History ==
=== Planning ===
The tower blocks were the brainchild of the Chairman of Birmingham's House Building and Housing Management Committees returning from a visit to Chicago to witness the opening of the Marina City development which consists of two 61-storey towers. The councillors decided that Birmingham needed a development similar to this and in 1965, plans began to surface for the construction of twin towers at Holloway Head to overlook the new ring road.

After discussions over height, it was decided that the tower blocks should be 32 storeys tall, one storey taller than the Red Road tower blocks in Glasgow, Scotland. It was decided to construct them out of concrete, which was common among tower blocks in the city during that time. They were designed by C.Bryant & Son.

=== Construction ===
The project was approved in 1967 and construction of the towers commenced immediately. Cleveland Tower was completed in 1970 and Clydesdale Tower in 1971. Upon their opening, they had 488 flats.

During the height of the HIV/AIDS crisis the number of gay men living in the Sentinels provoked hysteria in the media with the tabloid Daily Star interviewing one new resident who said that she wore protective gloves when touching the buttons on the lift in fear of contracting the disease.

=== Refurbishment ===
In 2004, the Sentinels Residents Association submitted a petition to Birmingham City Council complaining about waste facilities. They also complained about a man, who had previously threatened suicide, being rehoused on a high floor of one of the towers.

== See also ==
- Beetham Tower, Birmingham – 122 m tall mixed-use skyscraper in Birmingham city centre, England
- List of tallest buildings and structures in Birmingham
