= Urbis =

Coordinates: 53°29′08″N 2°14′31″W

- National Football Museum
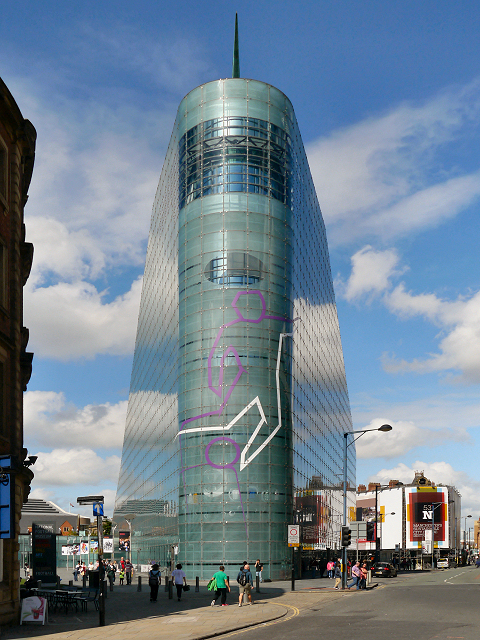
- Urbis from Corporation Street

General information
- Status: Home of National Football Museum (since 2012)
- Type: Exhibition and Museum Centre
- Location: Cathedral Gardens, Manchester city centre, Manchester
- Opened: 2002
- Cost: £30 million

Technical details
- Structural system: Concrete and glass
- Floor count: 6

Design and construction
- Architect: Ian Simpson
- Architecture firm: SimpsonHaugh and Partners

Urbis is a building in Manchester, England, designed by Ian Simpson, which opened in 2002 as part of the redevelopment of Exchange Square. Originally a Museum of the City, a switch was made in 2005-06 to presenting exhibitions on popular culture alongside talks, gigs and special events. Urbis closed in 2010, reopening in 2012 as the National Football Museum.

== Architecture and design ==
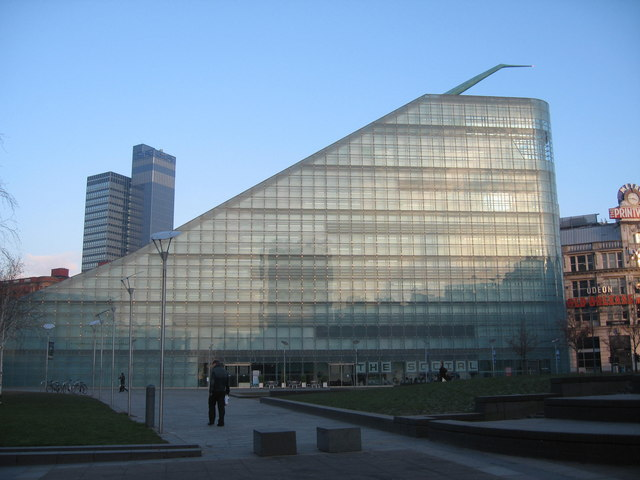
Urbis from Cathedral Gardens.

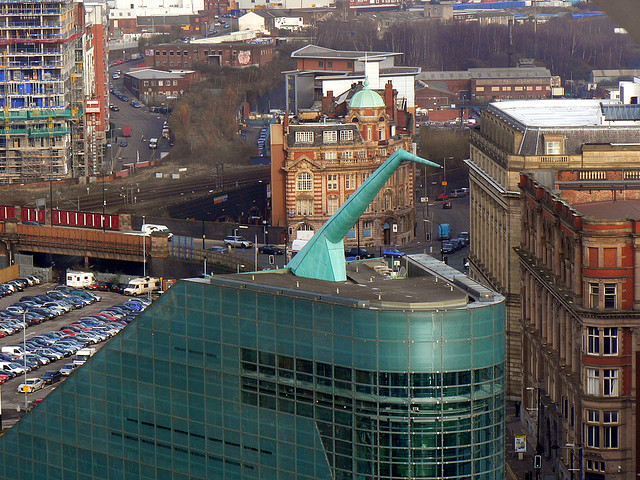
Detail of Urbis' roof. The pinnacle is designed to point towards the city centre.

Urbis is a building in Cathedral Gardens, designed by Simpson Haugh and Partners with consulting engineers Martin Stockley Associates. The building has six storeys and a distinctive sloping form. Visitors were intended to travel to the top floor, accessed by a lift, to admire the cityscape, then progress down a series of cascading mezzanine floors past exhibits about cities. The fully glazed facades consist of approximately 2,200 glass panes arranged in horizontal strips. The building has an adiabatic cooling system for use in summer and heat recovery system for use in winter increasing its energy efficiency.

== History ==
Urbis, a museum and exhibition centre intended to showcase inner-city life, opened on 27 June 2002 as a symbol of regeneration after the IRA's 1996 Manchester bombing. The project attracted £30 million funding from the Millennium Commission and £1 million from Manchester City Council towards the running costs. The exhibition space covered five floors and hosted temporary exhibitions running for between three and five months.

The museum's first director, Elizabeth Usher, resigned in March 2003 amid criticism that Urbis was not appealing and the exhibits were too abstract. First-year visitor figures fell 58,000 short of its 200,000 target and the Millennium Commission, who provided £20m of funds, threatened to reclaim its money if Manchester City Council had to close it.

Visitors paying a £5 admission fee were unimpressed and few visitors returned, which the management saw as a key problem. By October 2003, visitor numbers were below 200 a day and there was criticism over a £2m annual subsidy from Manchester City Council, The Guardian architecture critic Deyan Sudjic remarked that the exhibits were a "spectacular missed opportunity", although Urbis did garner some praise in other quarters.

In an attempt to boost visitor figures, the admission fee was scrapped in December 2003. The plan worked: visitor figures trebled by January 2004 steadily increasing to fivefold by April 2004.

Urbis' chief executive admitted in 2010 that the 'Museum of the City', which ran from 2002 to 2004, "just didn't work". In 2004, a radical decision was taken to rebrand Urbis as an exhibition centre for British popular culture with emphasis on Manchester and no longer called a museum in an attempt to give it a clear identity. With no admission fee, Urbis shook off its white elephant title as visitor numbers rose and over a quarter of visitors came from outside the city.

=== National Football Museum ===
Urbis closed in February 2010 for conversion to the National Football Museum. Plans to relocate the National Football Museum from Preston in Lancashire had emerged in 2009. The museum trustees cited long-term funding worries as the reason for relocating to Manchester where 400,000 visitors a year – four times the previous figure – are expected.

Preston City Council, unhappy at the proposals, attempted to thwart the move. The University of Central Lancashire, Lancashire County Council and Preston City Council offered the museum £400,000 per year but were outbid by Manchester City Council's £2 million. Admission is free and a broad advertising campaign will aim to attract visitors to Urbis. In the first 9 months of opening, the museum had already attracted 350,000 visitors.

== History of exhibitions and events ==
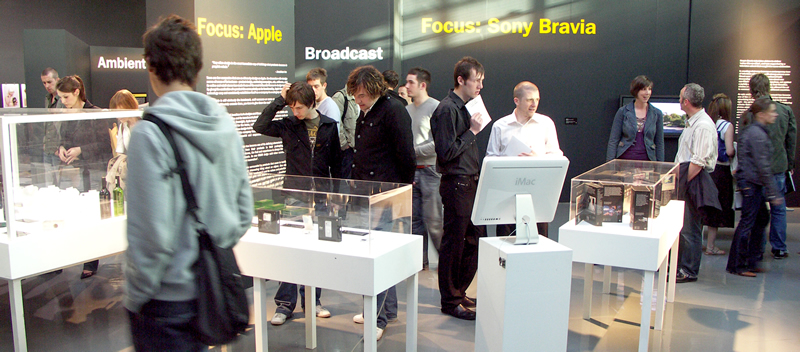
The launch night for the D&AD exhibition at Urbis

2009

State of Art: New York from April to September showcased contemporary art in New York. Videogame Nation charted the rise of video games over four decades, how it became a multibillion-pound industry and the Wii and Nintendo DS. The Best of Manchester Awards 2009 celebrated Mancunian culture in 2009. Home Grown: The Story of UK Hip Hop, from October 2009 to February 2010, documented the hip-hop music scene. Manchester, Television & the City: Ghosts of Winter Hill explored the city's television industry, Granada Television, BBC North and programmes created in Manchester. The exhibition coincided with the digital switchover in the region and television's move to MediaCityUK.

2008

The Manchester Zinefest was about independent publishing and zines. How Manga Took Over The World explored how Manga, influenced 21st-century art culture. Reality Hack: Hidden Manchester, atmospheric photographs of Manchester's abandoned recesses by Andrew Brooks and curated by Andy Brydon. Urban Gardening featured gardening in urban environments. Emory Douglas retrospective exhibited the work an artist involved with the Black Panther organisation.

2007

- The Haçienda 25 The Exhibition: Fac 491
- D&AD Exhibition: The Best Design and Advertising in the World
- Catapult 07
- Arrivals & Departures: New Art Perspectives of Hong Kong
- PLAY: Experience the Adventure of Our Cities
- City 'til I Die?
- Best of Manchester
- Bog Standard Gallery

2006

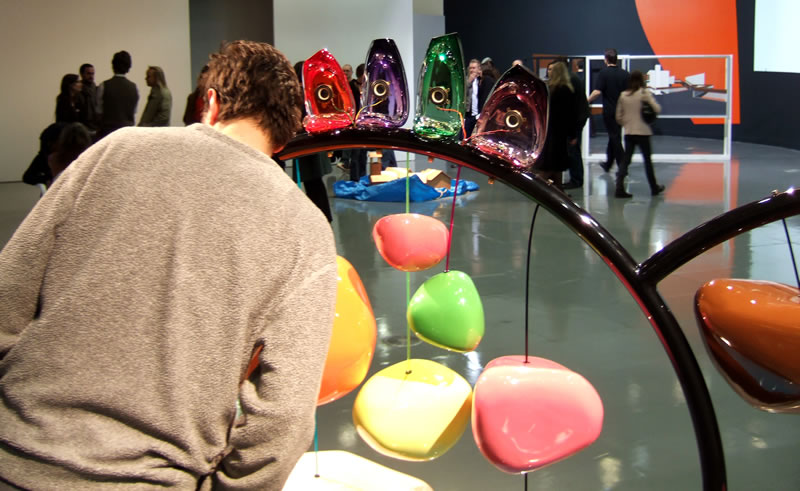
The British Art Show 6 at Urbis

- Under Surveillance
- British Art Show 6
- Little Black Dress
- D&AD: The Best Advertising Design in the World
- Manchester 0161: This is what we're made of
- The China Show
- Make Me Shine

2005

The SuperCity exhibition at Urbis

- Rock 'n' Roll Icons: the photography of Mick Rock
- Punk: Sex, Seditionaries and the Sex Pistols
- SuperCity

2004

- Manchester 24
- ILL COMMUNICATION II
- DTroit
- The Sounds of Two Cities
- Futuresonic04
- The Peter Saville Show

2003

- Compost Cities
- Ill Communication
- Taxi!
- Heliodays in the rainy city

2002

- Architecture by Stealth

== See also ==
- Cathedral Gardens
