= 10 Holloway Circus =

Mixed-use skyscraper in Birmingham, England

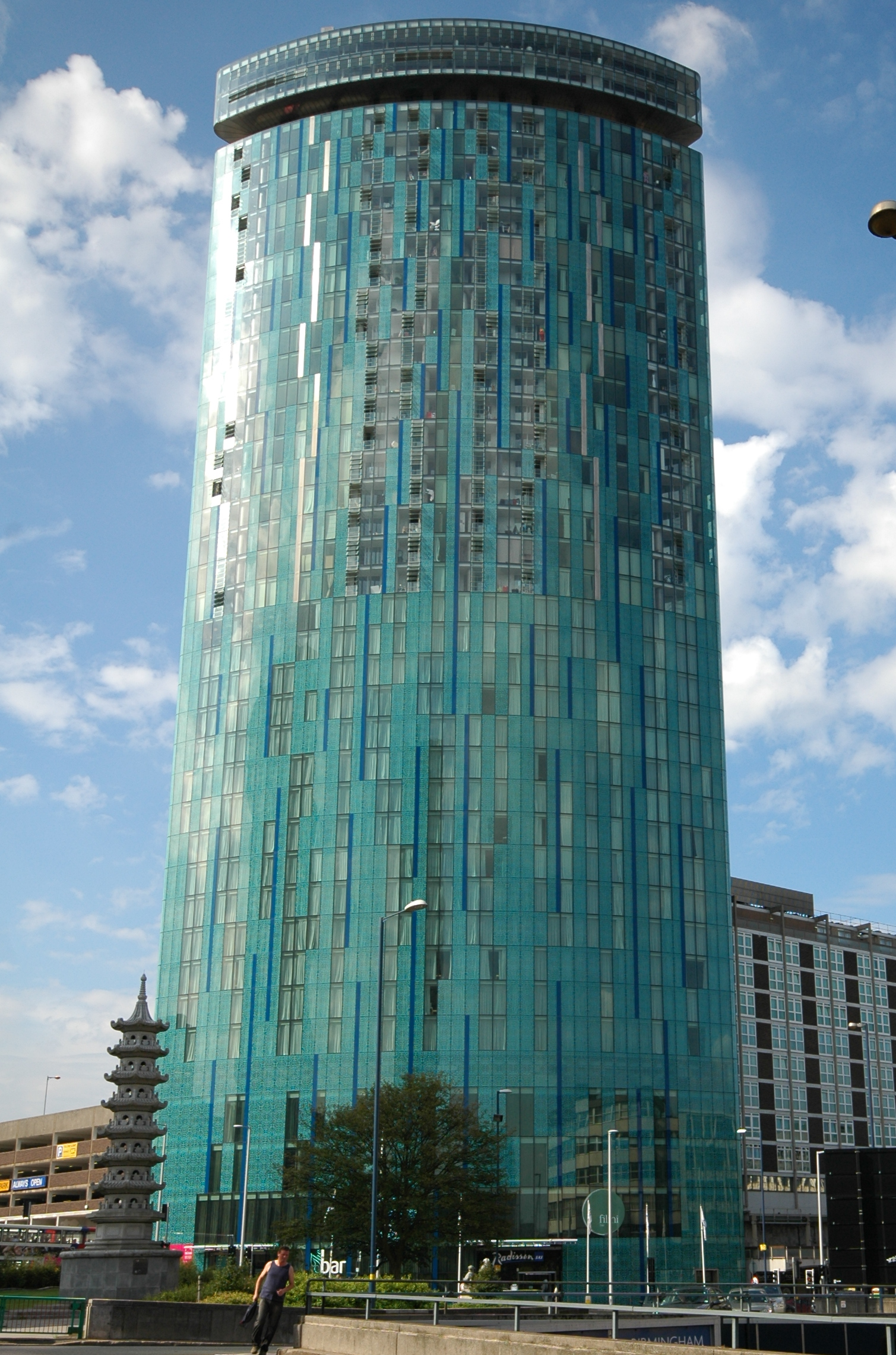
- Interactive map of the 10 Holloway Circus area
- Alternative names: Beetham Tower; Radisson Tower; Holloway Circus Tower

General information
- Type: Hotel & Residential
- Architectural style: Postmodern
- Location: Holloway Circus, Birmingham, England
- Coordinates: 52°28′31.46″N 1°54′0.59″W
- Current tenants: Radisson SAS
- Construction started: March 2003
- Completed: May 2006
- Cost: 35.94 million Pound sterling
- Client: Beetham Organization

Height
- Height: 400 feet (122 m)

Technical details
- Floor count: 39

Design and construction
- Architect: Ian Simpson
- Structural engineer: WSP Cantor Seinuk
- Services engineer: Buro Happold
- Main contractor: Laing O'Rourke Midlands

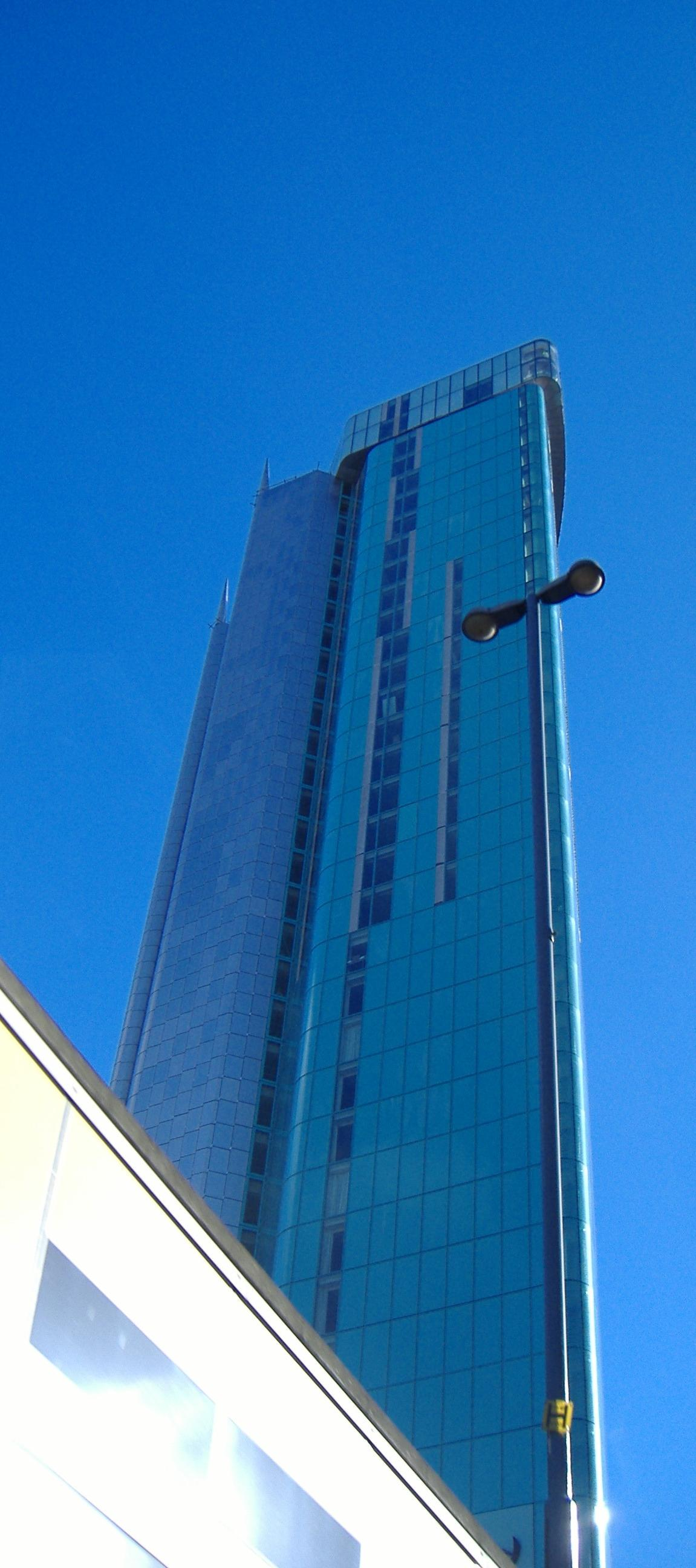
Holloway Circus Tower nearing completion in February 2006. Rear view.

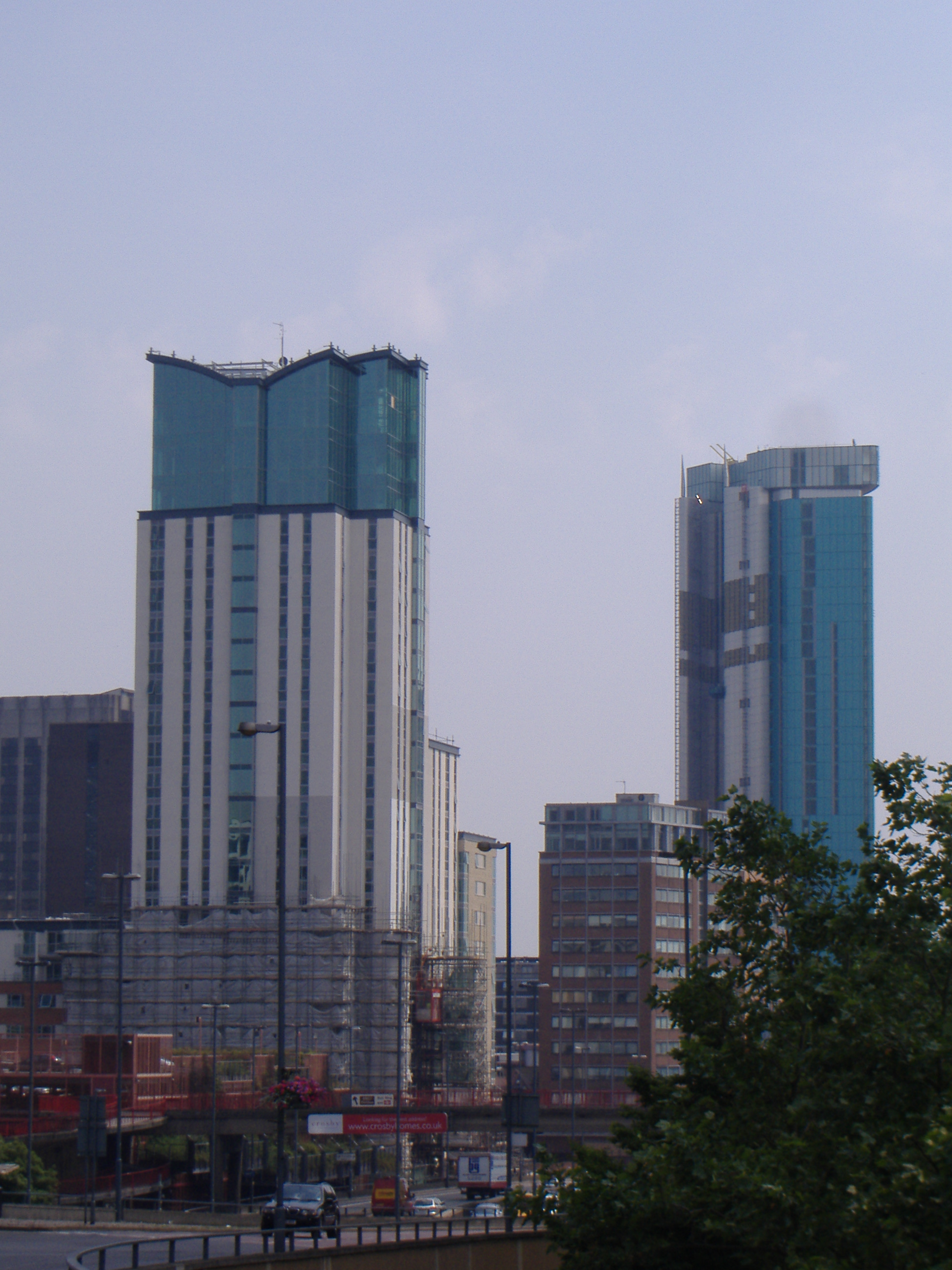
Holloway Circus Tower (right) and the Orion Building (left) during the reattaching of the rear panels.

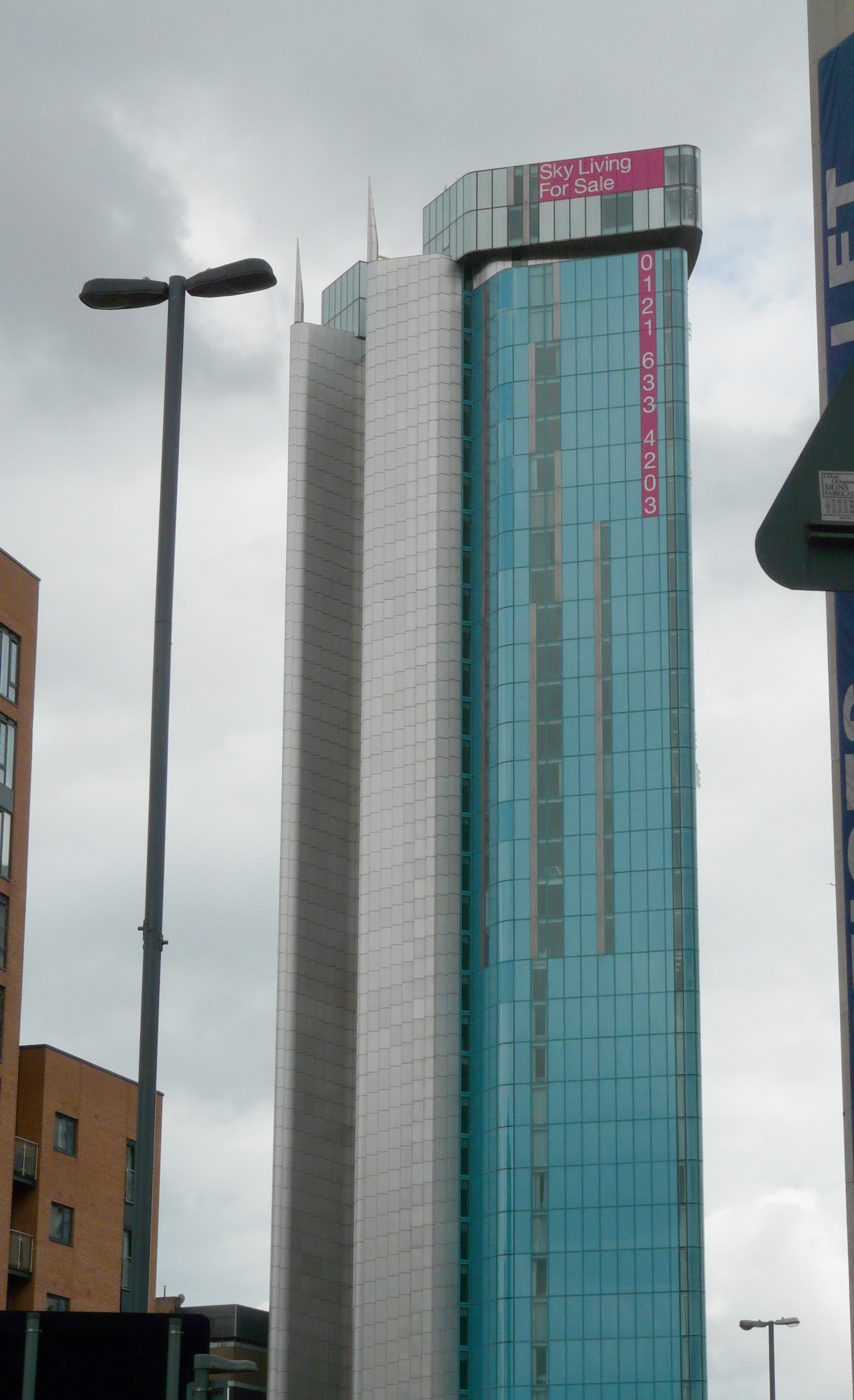
The tower from approximately 250 metres away.

10 Holloway Circus (also known as Beetham Tower, Radisson Tower, or Holloway Circus Tower) is a 400-foot (122 m) tall mixed-use skyscraper in Birmingham city centre, England. It was originally named after the developers, Beetham Organisation, and was designed by Ian Simpson and built by Laing O'Rourke. The entire development covers an area of 7,000 square feet (650 m^{2}). It is the 5th tallest building in Birmingham and the joint–94th tallest building in the United Kingdom.

== Features ==
It has 39 floors, and is the third tallest structure in the city after the 499 ft (152 m) British Telecom Tower and the 433 ft (132 m) The Mercian.

The front façade of the building is floor-to-ceiling glass decorated in "tiger stripes" which are used to enhance the vertical impact. As the apartments were being furbished, an aqua coloured camouflage was also added to these windows with some of the tiger stripes being removed. Coloured lights can be seen underneath the overhang at night.

The lower 19-floors are a Radisson Blu hotel, which opened to guests on 16 January 2006 whilst the upper floors were still being furnished. The upper 20 floors contain 158 apartments.

There are eight circular concrete columns as well as the core on each floor. The post-tensioned flat plates of the upper floors are concrete and measure 9 in (225 mm) in thickness.

10 Holloway Circus received 12 points in the 2006 Emporis Skyscraper Awards placing it in eighth position in the top ten.

== Design and construction ==
The plans for the development were first revealed in 1998 as part of a competition in which designs for a tower acting as a gateway to the city centre were to be submitted to the council and also for a building that could aid the regeneration plans in and around the area. The site chosen was the AEU Building, designed by The John Madin Design Group and completed in 1957, at Holloway Circus. Two serious proposals were put forward, one by Cala Homes, which consisted of two cylindrical glass towers, and the other by the Beetham Corporation, which was a single 44-storey tower with two spires on the roof producing a total height of 630 feet (192 m). The Beetham Corporation won, however it was forced to scale down the towers height, due to height limits enforced after the September 11 terrorist attacks on the World Trade Center, by the Civil Aviation Authority. The spires were also removed and replaced by two cones placed on the rear of the tower on top of the stairwells. The overhang at the front was added. The proposed office space was also removed and the planning application was withdrawn.

The new design was submitted, however, was withdrawn by the Beetham Corporation after talks over the purchase of the adjacent multi-storey car park with National Car Parks broke down without a deal. This was a surprise to the developers as they had expected to be able to purchase the land and had even included their plans for the site in the previous planning application. Amendments to the planning application were made and it was resubmitted in October 2000.

The final design was approved by the Planning Department at Birmingham City Council with conditions on 3 April 2003 after the Beetham Corporation paid £1.8 million under Section 106 to gain planning approval.

A model of the tower was tested in a wind tunnel with models of surrounding buildings also being included. The ground of the model was also accurate to that of the Birmingham landscape. The model passed with few problems and construction of the tower began.

Construction began in March 2003 with the erection of hoardings around the site allowing clearance work to commence and the construction of a tower crane. The concrete core then began to rise and reached a considerable height before the construction of the concrete floor panels began. The transportation of materials to the higher levels were done using a lift attached to the middle of the curved frontage. That area was intended to be used as a staircase in the case of an emergency. The building topped out in April 2005.

The construction of the building encountered several problems. Not far into the construction of the lift shaft, a piece of scaffolding became dislodged and fell to the ground causing traffic delays around Holloway Circus which subsequently resulted in widespread disruption in the city centre. On 24 November 2005, 5 pieces of cladding from the higher levels on the sides became detached from the building and fell to the ground. No injuries were caused, however fear of more panels falling off caused nearby roads to be closed for an entire weekend, until the site could be declared safe by inspectors. Clips were later installed to secure the panels, and as of mid-2006, work was underway to permanently secure the panels in place using new clips. The securing of the panels was completed in late-August 2006. The Beetham Corporation could now face legal action due to the structure causing road closures and subsequent congestion. Excluding the problems with the panel clips, construction of the floors took ten months. Concrete was the primary material in the construction of the structure.

The Beetham Organisation again faced legal action over claims by people who signed contracts to buy flats before the tower was completed that the flats they received did not match those described in the sales literature.

As a result of technical problems within the underground car park, resident's cars were trapped for three days. Cars are placed on a platform and are taken into a space by a computer when the owner's card is swiped, however, glitches meant that people who had purchased spaces within the park either could not get access to their cars or were unable to enter the car park in their vehicles.

10 Holloway Circus faced yet more problems when, on 8 July 2007, a glass panel shattered and sent pieces raining 60 feet (18 m) onto the ground. The 6 ft (1.8 m) by 3 ft (0.91 m) panel on the eighth floor of Beetham Tower is believed to have shattered due to a build up of chemical compounds inside the glass. Splinters fell onto the car park roof and Smallbrook Queensway at about 6.30 am. It was the third safety incident at the tower in three years.

== See also ==
- List of tallest buildings and structures in Birmingham
- The Sentinels, two tower blocks opposite on Holloway Head.

Two other towers in the UK share the same name:

- Beetham Tower, Manchester
- Beetham Tower, Liverpool
