= River Street Tower =

Residential building in Manchester, England

Coordinates: 53.470824°N 2.249284°W

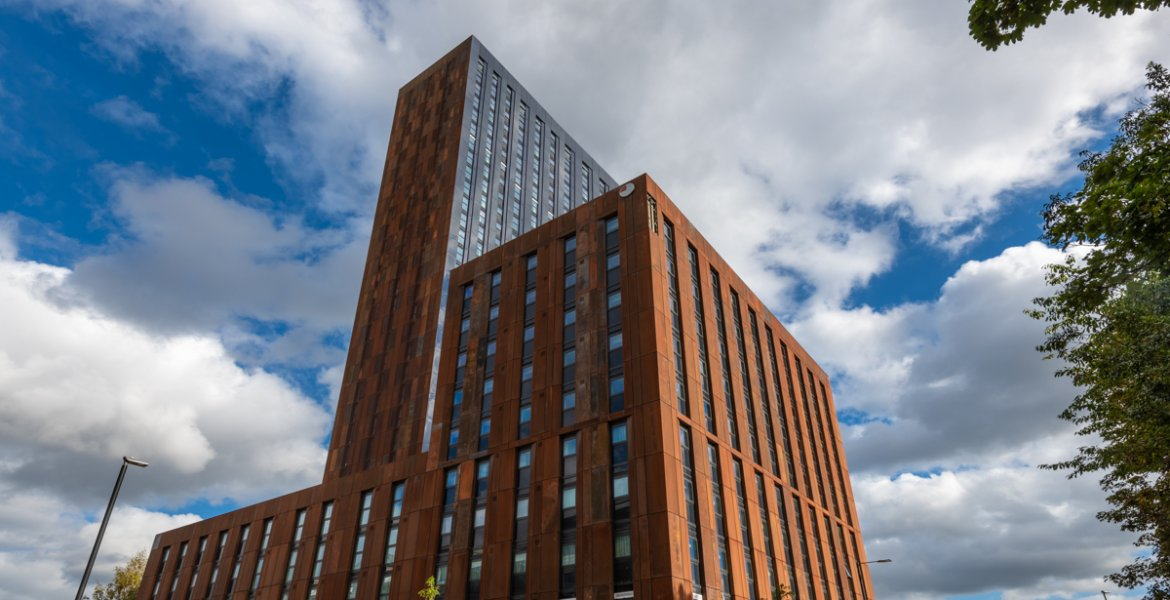
- River Street Tower, September 2020

General information
- Status: Completed
- Type: Residential
- Architectural style: Neomodern
- Location: Manchester, England
- Construction started: 2018
- Completed: 2020
- Cost: £95 million

Height
- Roof: 92 m (302 ft)

Technical details
- Floor count: 32

Design and construction
- Architect: SimpsonHaugh and Partners
- Developer: Downing

River Street Tower (also known as the Downing Tower after its developer) is a high-rise residential tower in Manchester, England. The tower is situated immediately north of the Mancunian Way on land which was formerly occupied by a concrete car park frame from 2005 to 2018.

A 125 m (410 ft) tall tower was originally approved in October 2012. However, the scheme never materialised and the land was sold to new owners. A revised scheme for the site was approved in 2017 for a 32-storey, 92 m (302 ft) tall high-rise tower, comprising 420 apartments targeted at the student accommodation market.

The unfinished concrete frame was demolished in May 2018 and construction commenced on the tower in summer 2018.

== Background ==
=== 2012 scheme ===
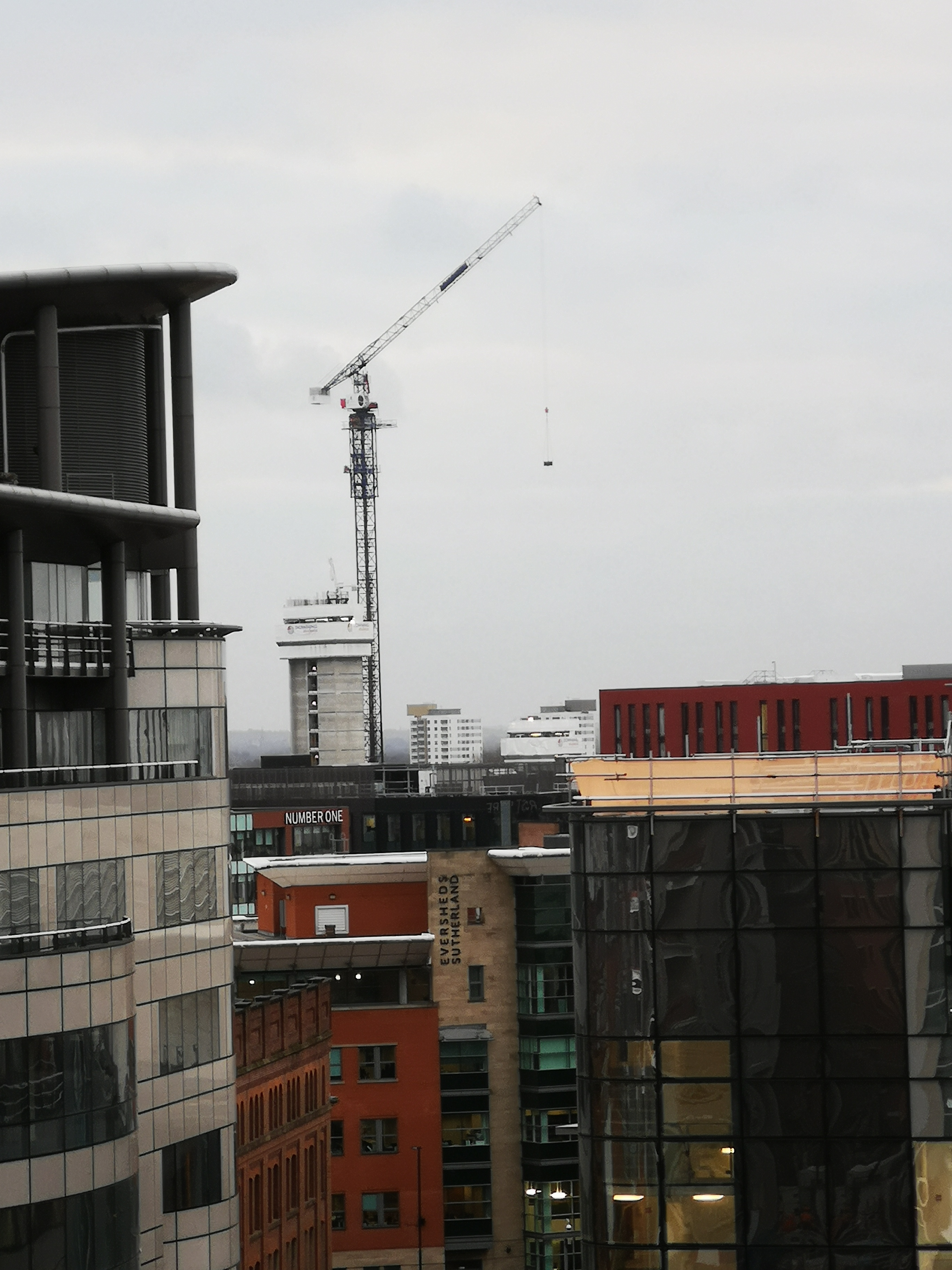
River Street Tower under construction

The development was located on a site on River Street, beside Manchester city centre's southern boundary next to the Mancunian Way. At the time of the planning submission in 2012, the site was occupied by a half-built concrete frame, originally built for a medium-rise apartment block in 2004. The developer went bankrupt and the concrete frame remained uncompleted for 13 years. Chelmer Developments bought the site in April 2011 and pursued development opportunities. Liaising with Manchester City Council, the company commissioned SimpsonHaugh and Partners to devise design proposals for a skyscraper building above 100 m (330 ft) in height. The company held a four-week consultation period in spring 2012.

The 2012 approved scheme included 600 serviced apartments designed for short-stay 'serviced living' as well as a café and gym. The tower would have been similar to modernist buildings such as the New Century House and will reflect light to create effect. The architect, Ian Simpson described the building as "a simple, very elegant and slender building with a glass surface so it will pick up reflections from the light and I think it will be quite dramatic".

The planning application was submitted in July 2012 and Manchester City Council approved the plans in October 2012. Approval was confirmed on 25 October 2012 at the monthly planning committee meeting. Demolition of the existing concrete structure was expected to begin in earnest, though works did not commence.

The land was subsequently sold to new owners, Bolton-based development firm Forshaw Land & Property and a revised planning application was made and approved by Manchester City Council in 2015 for 420 privately rented apartments, fewer than the 600 originally planned in the 2012 scheme. Construction of the skyscraper was expected to take approximately 18 months with the demolition of the concrete car park shell to commence in November 2015. However, by May 2017 construction had yet to begin, and the car park structure had not been demolished.

The scheme was effectively abandoned when new owners of the site proposed a different and smaller building in December 2017.

=== 2017 scheme ===
A planning application was submitted in late 2017 for a tower reduced in scale which was approved in January 2018. The concrete frame which had been incomplete since 2005 was finally demolished in May 2018. Groundworks commenced in summer 2018 with the core beginning to rise in October 2018. In September 2020, the building was completed and began taking bookings for students.

== See also ==
- List of tallest buildings and structures in Greater Manchester
