= West Tower =

Skyscraper in Liverpool, England

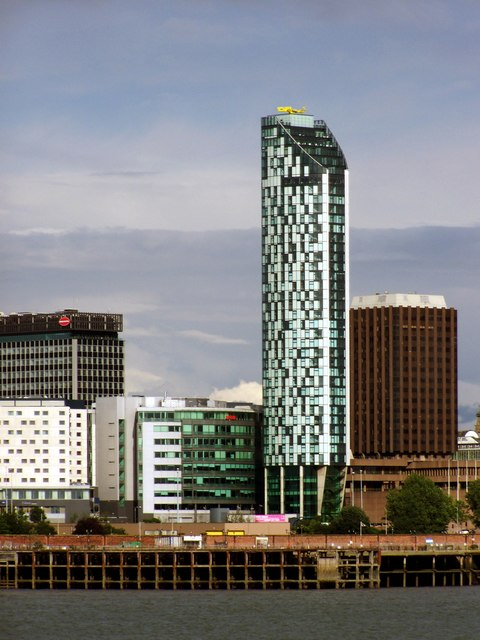

General information
- Type: Mixed
- Location: Liverpool, England, United Kingdom
- Coordinates: 53.40987°N 2.99668°W
- Construction started: 2005
- Completed: 2007
- Cost: £35,000,000

Height
- Roof: 140 metres (459 ft)

Technical details
- Floor count: 40
- Lifts/elevators: 2

Design and construction
- Architect: Aedas
- Developer: Beetham
- Main contractor: Carillion

Other information
- Number of units: 127

West Tower is a 40-storey tall skyscraper in Liverpool, England. It is the tallest building in Liverpool. The building was the second tower to be built by Carillion in Liverpool for property developers Beetham, who now use the building as their headquarters.

== Description ==
With an architectural height of 140 metres (459 ft) and 40 floors, West Tower is the tallest building in Liverpool. Nationwide, it is ranked at 62nd tallest in the United Kingdom but is the tallest in the country outside of Greater London, Greater Manchester and Birmingham. The building commands views across the city, over the Mersey to the Wirral and as far as Blackpool on a clear day. The first five floors are the new headquarters for the Beetham Organization and the remaining floors, apart from the 34th, have been divided into luxury apartments and penthouses.

However, unlike St. John's Beacon, West Tower has no antennae on the roof. Therefore, when considering height excluding antennas, West Tower is the highest building in Liverpool.

The five floors of Beetham's offices are set back between concrete columns and are fully glazed. A glazed lift and stair serving the office are accommodated between raking fins with views to the river.

The 127 apartments are clad in a fully glazed perimeter curtain wall of random clear and opaque panels and are orientated to provide views of both the city and river. The upper penthouse floors are tiered back to incorporate external terraces behind glazed balustrade screens.

The 34th floor is home to Liverpool's highest restaurant, Panoramic. This floor is completely clad in a clear glass perimeter offering diners views of the city of Liverpool and further afield.

== Awards ==
At the 4th Liverpool Daily Post Regional Property Awards in association with RBS, Beetham West Tower won Aedas the best Mixed Use Development prize. This prize was awarded for best use of land which would normally have stood barren; creation of an "iconic" building; and best use of limited space.

== Administration ==
In February 2011, the West Tower went into administration after the parent companies were hit by falling property prices. Out of the 123 apartments, 106 had been purchased as buy to let investments, while 17 were owner-occupied or unsold.

== Gallery ==
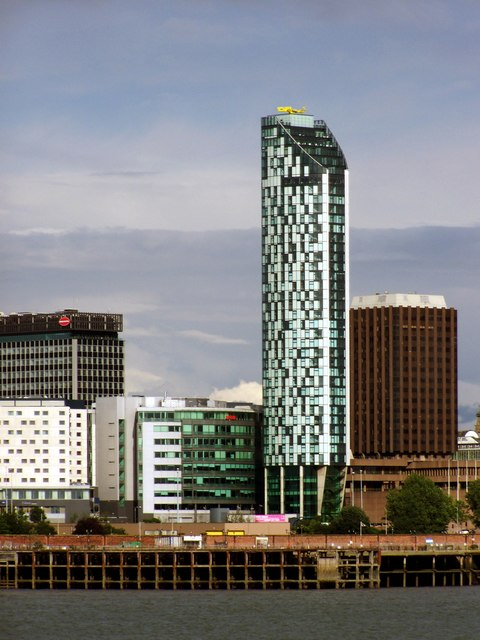
West Tower viewed from Seacombe

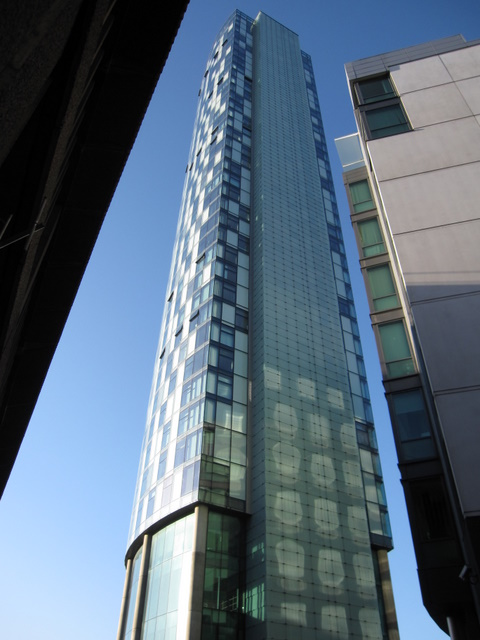
West Tower viewed from ground level

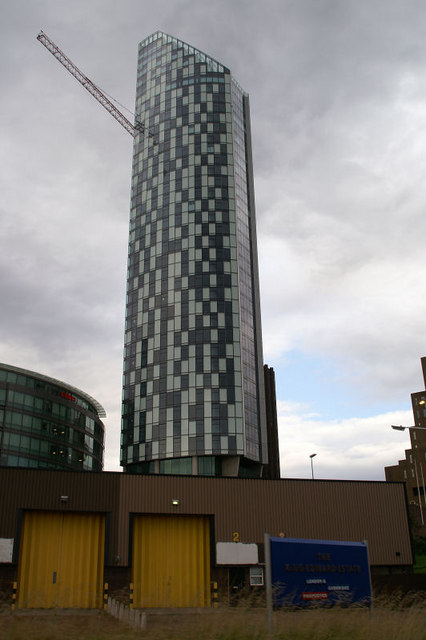
West Tower viewed from ground level

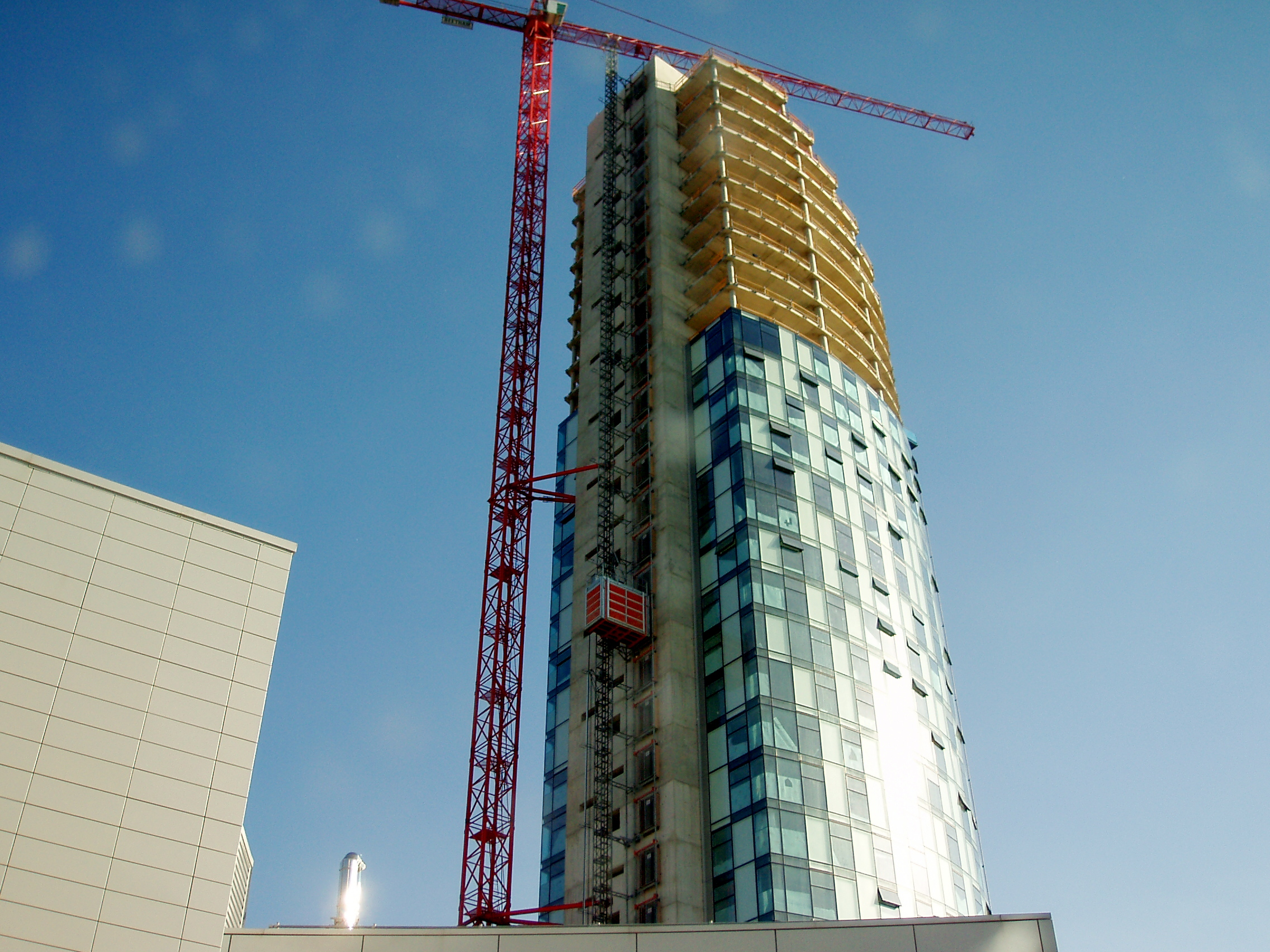
West Tower under construction in May, 2007

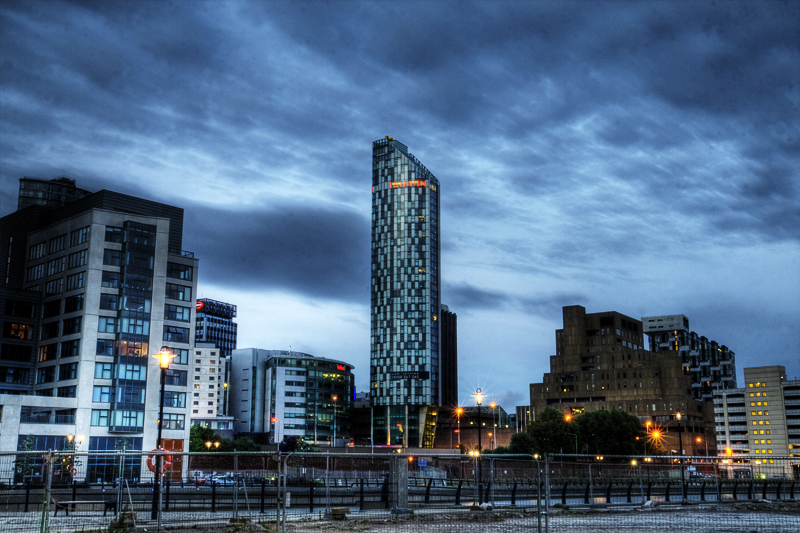
West Tower at night

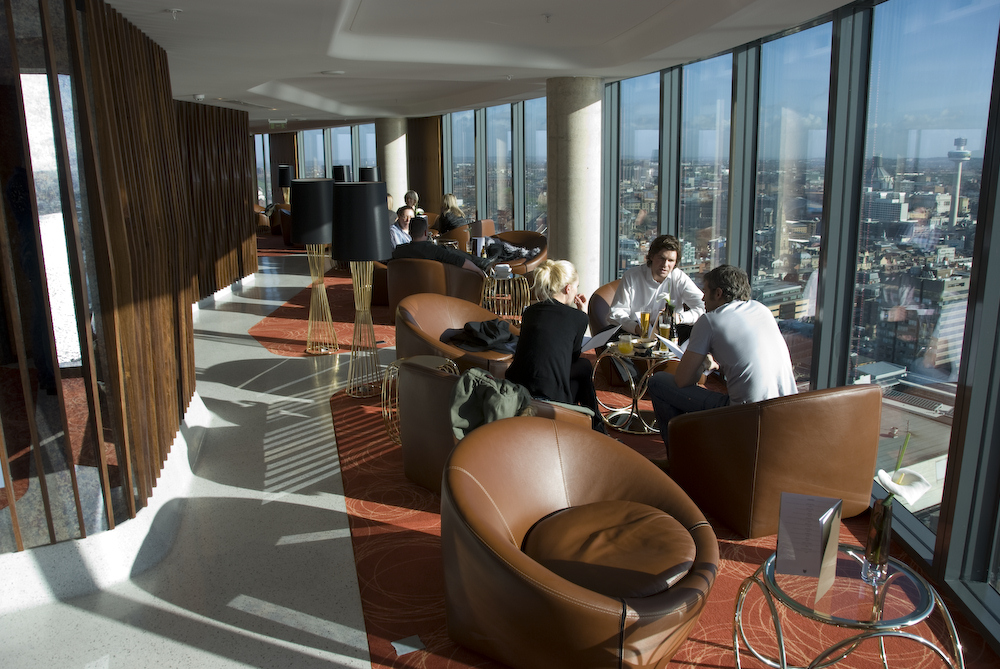
The 34th floor restaurant 'Panoramic'

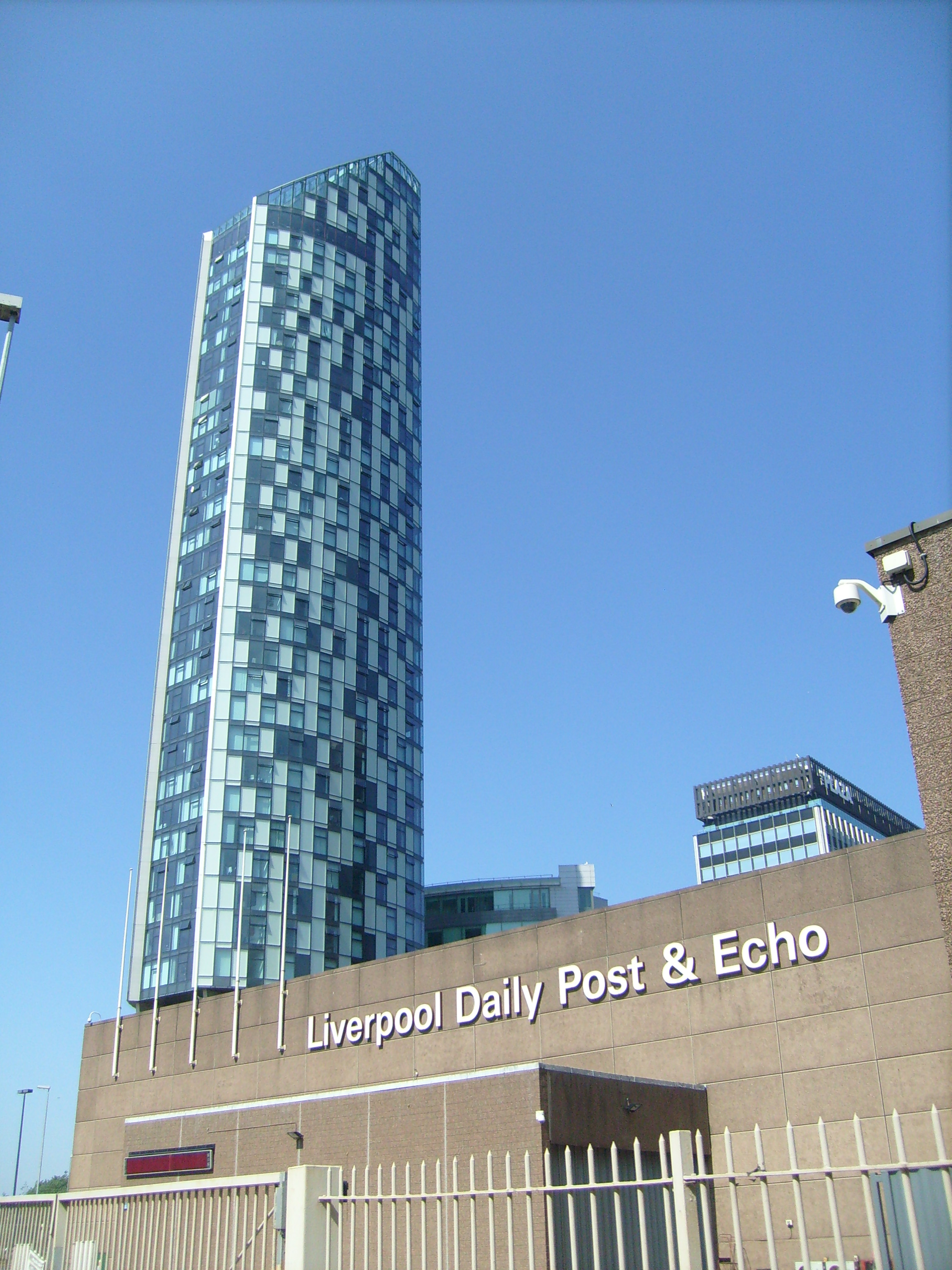
West Tower along with the Post & Echo Building

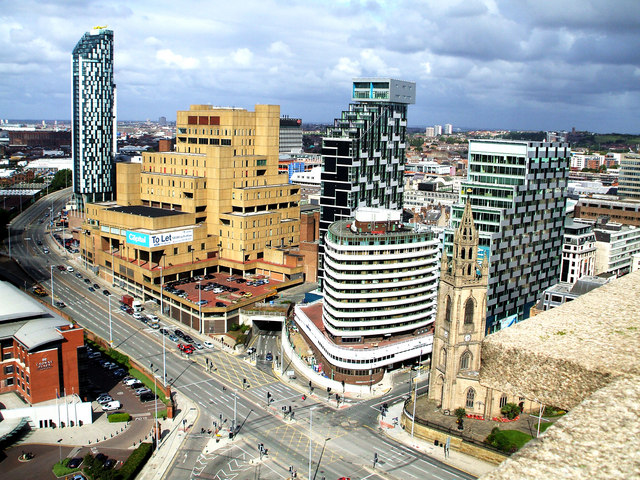
West Tower within the Commercial District

Records
Preceded by Radio City Tower	Tallest Building in Liverpool; 2008 – present	Incumbent
