= One Blackfriars =

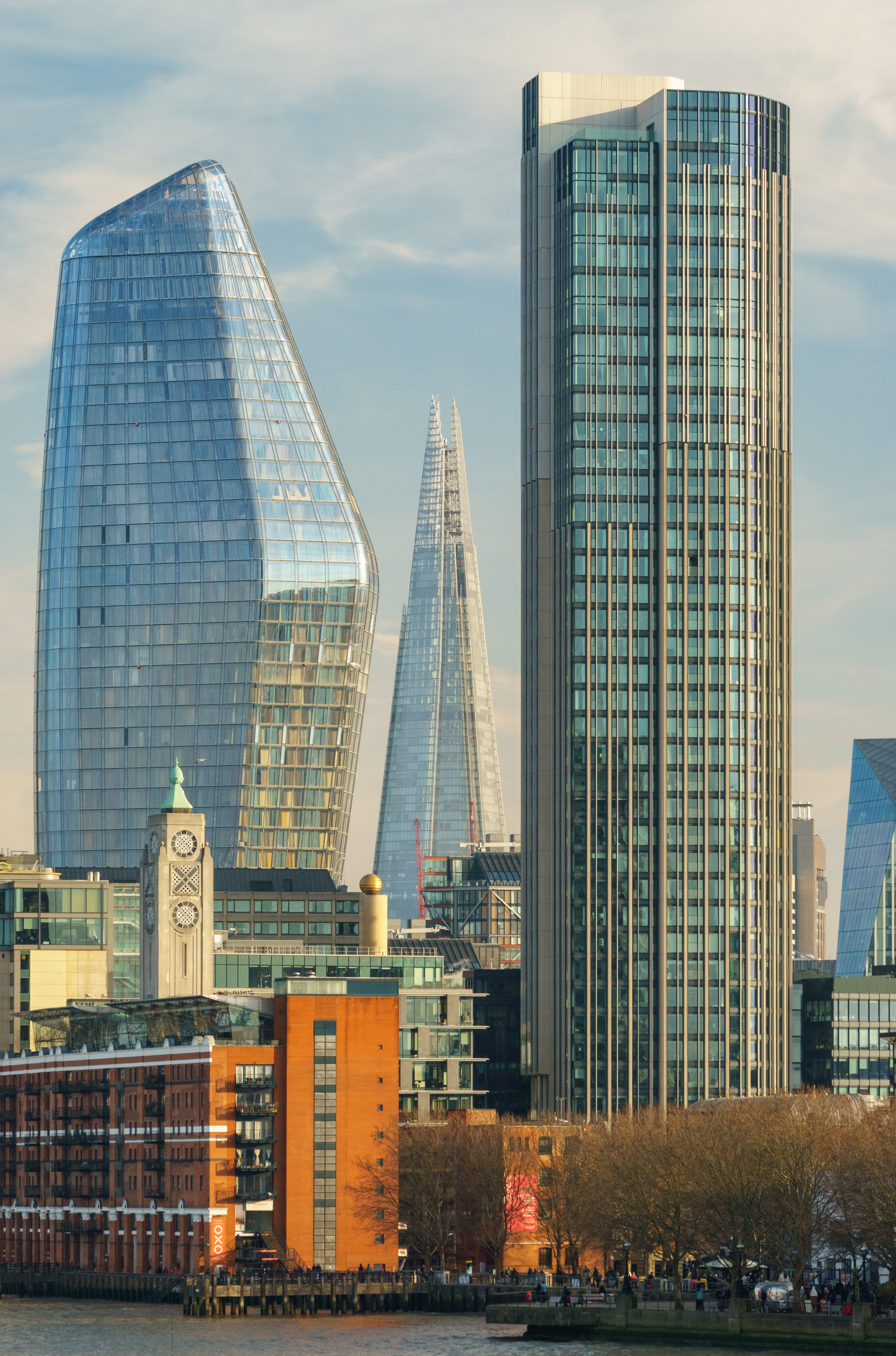
- One Blackfriars (left), The Shard, and South Bank Tower from Waterloo Bridge, January 2019
- Interactive map of the One Blackfriars area

General information
- Status: Completed
- Location: London, SE1; United Kingdom
- Coordinates: 51.5078°N 0.1047°W
- Construction started: 2013
- Completed: 2018
- Client: St. George South London Limited

Height
- Roof: 166.3 m (546 ft)

Technical details
- Floor count: 50
- Floor area: 74,925 square metres (806,490 sq ft) including 274 flats

Design and construction
- Architect: SimpsonHaugh and Partners
- Structural engineer: WSP Group
- Services engineer: Hoare Lea
- Other designers: Tara Bernerd & Partners (interior designers); Byrne Bros Ltd (PT slabs)

Website
- oneblackfriars.co.uk

One Blackfriars is a mixed-use development at No. 1 Blackfriars Road in Bankside, London. It is informally known as The Vase or The Boomerang due to its shape.

The development is made up of a 50-storey tower of a maximum height of 166.3 m (546 ft) and two smaller buildings of six and four storeys respectively. Uses include residential flats, a hotel and retail. In addition, a new public space will be created. The site was formerly occupied by the headquarters of Sainsbury's supermarket.

== Original planning and design ==
Initially promoted by the Beetham Organisation, the tower was originally proposed at 225 m (738 ft), with 68 storeys, but was eventually scaled down after concerns about its impact on the rest of London. A revised planning application for a 163 m (535 ft), 49-storey tower was submitted on 30 October 2006. Although 57 m (187 ft) shorter than before, this would still make it one of the tallest buildings in the city, similar in height to the Gherkin and Tower 42 in the City of London. According to the architect Ian Simpson, the unusual shape of the building was inspired by Timo Sarpaneva's classic Lansetti glass vase from 1952.

A public observation gallery was to have been situated on the upper two floors, offering panoramic views across the capital. The original plan would have featured a 5-star hotel and luxury apartments, each with their own internal conservatory space. However, a number of affordable homes were also included as part of the scheme in a separate building on Rennie Street.

Despite a number of objections - from English Heritage, Royal Parks, Lambeth Council, Westminster City Council, local residents and ward councillors − the tower was given initial planning permission by Southwark Council on 24 July 2007. The Mayor of London was in favour, and Lambeth Council wanted £180,615 of Section 106 money in compensation. The Dubai-based Jumeirah hotel chain signed up as anchor tenants. In March 2008, the tower was called in for a Public Inquiry by the then Secretary of State Hazel Blears. After the inquiry, Blears announced that she endorsed the recommendation of planning inspector John Gray that both schemes should be granted planning permission.

== Change in ownership ==
The project was placed into administration by The Royal Bank of Scotland in October 2010 following a breakdown in relationships in the project partnership. The site was purchased by Berkeley Group's St. George subsidiary in October 2011, leading to the renewed expectation that the tower would be built.

In January 2013, it was announced that the building was to go ahead and be built with some minor revisions.

== Second planning application and design ==
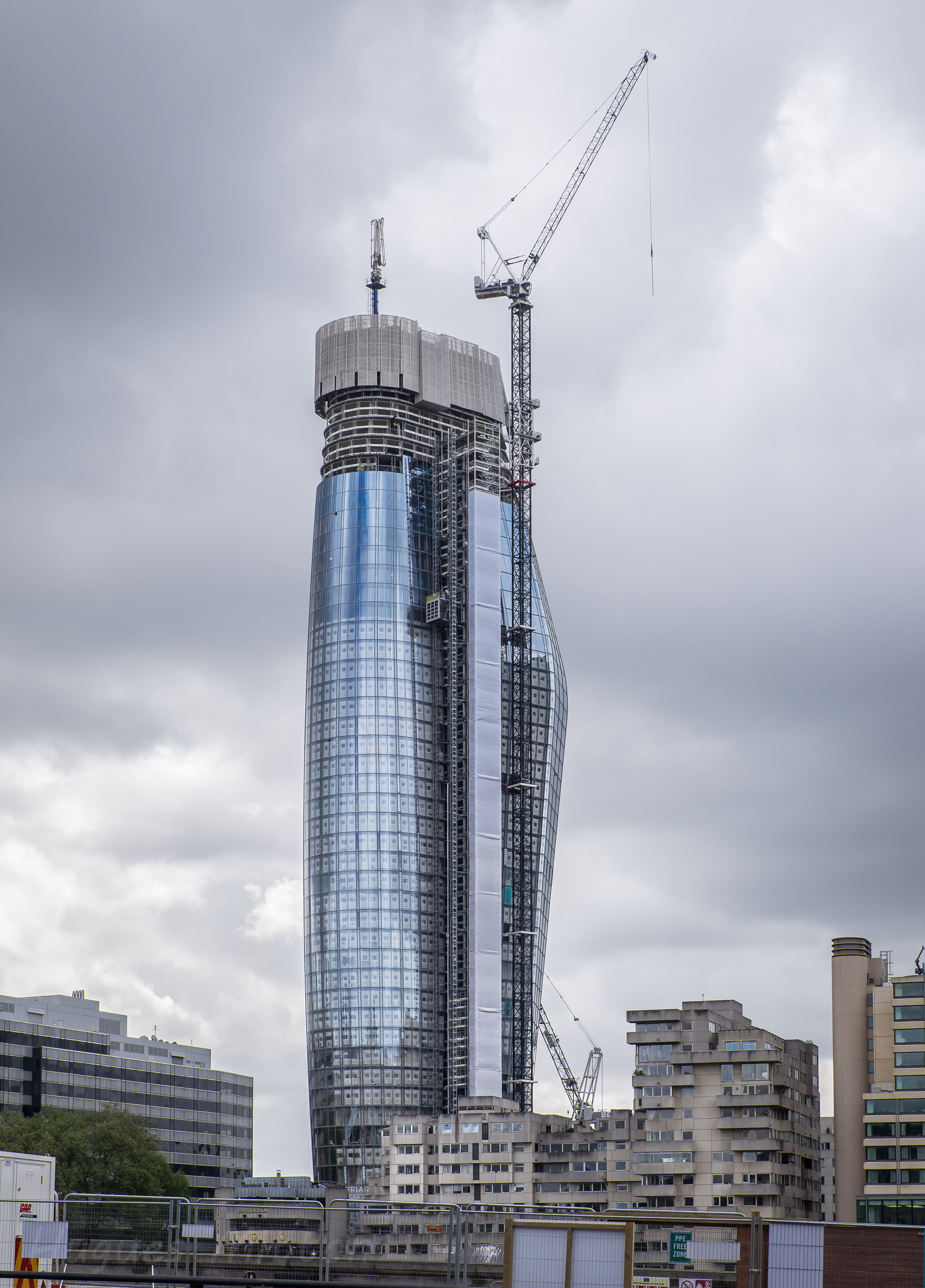
One Blackfriars under construction in April 2017

In May 2012, St George filed a new planning application for the site for the construction of three buildings: a virtually identical 50-storey tower as the original application along with a 6-storey building (The Rennie Street Building) and a 4-storey building (The Podium Building). The application was granted in October 2012.

The tower provides 274 private flats, however the viewing lounge on the 32nd floor received widespread criticism for revoking the promise of public access, when in reality it costs £50 per visit, and £30 per hour for residents and companies only in the local postcode. Critics pointed out that the public viewing area was the fundamental reason why the council permitted the development without social housing. The council have refused to release the information in relation to those transactions.

The number of flats includes 13 studio flats, 78 one bedroom, 120 two bedroom, 56 three bedroom, 6 four bedroom and 1 triplex. Southwark Council's Affordable SPD states that affordable housing in applicable developments should be located on the development site or exceptionally off site or through an in lieu payment. Southwark accepted the applicant's explanations of why an in lieu payment would be appropriate, the value of which was agreed at £29m. The cost to the developer of the provision of the public viewing lounge has been calculated at £5.5m (based on foregone revenue on lost floor space for two medium-sized flats).

== Construction ==
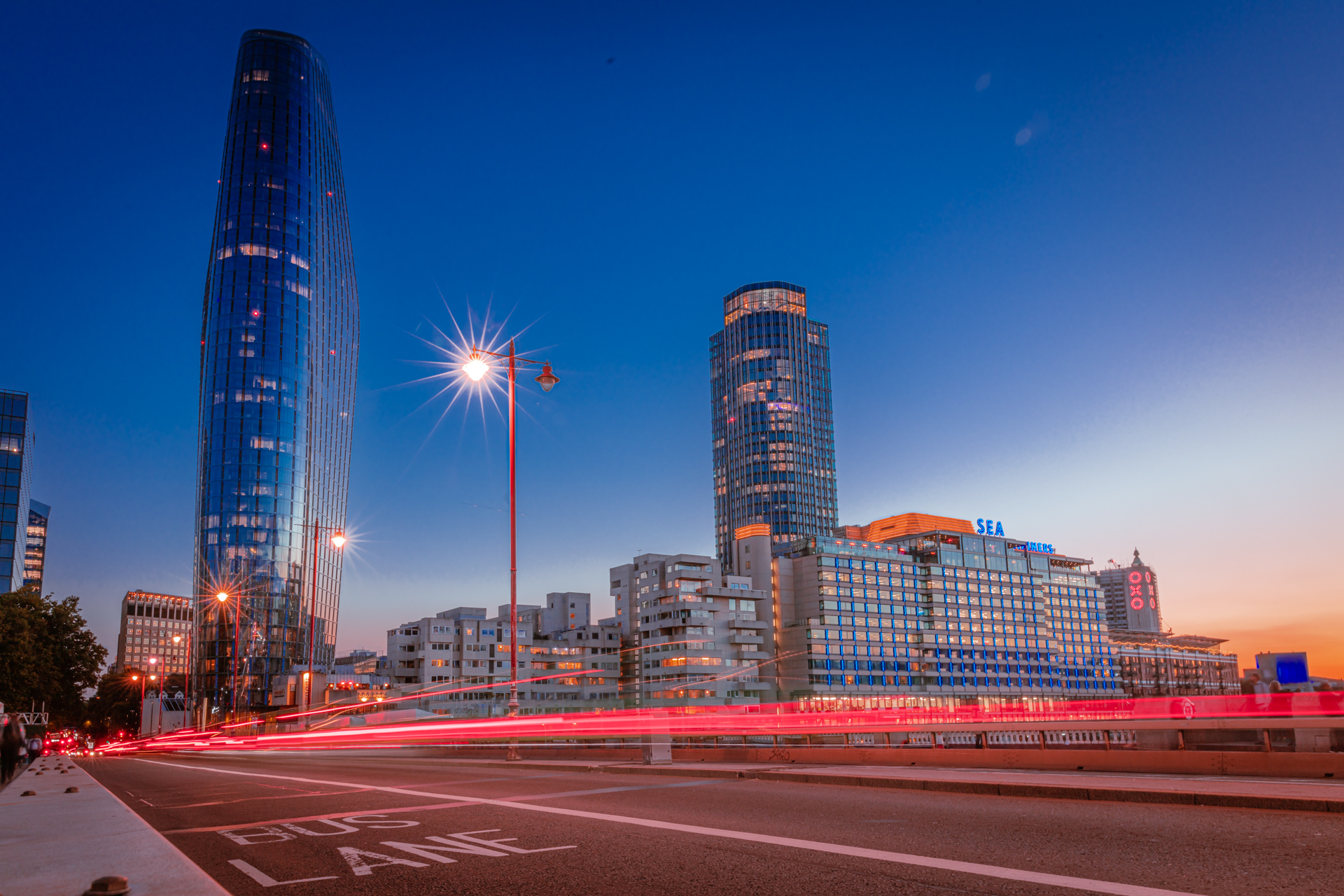
One Blackfriars in London, England, United Kingdom

A single storey marketing building was constructed during 2012 in the north east corner of the site and was due to be used for one year. In October 2013, a three-storey marketing building was constructed in the south eastern corner of the site and was due to stand for five years whilst the rest of the buildings were being completed. The ground-breaking ceremony also took place in October 2013.

The site topped out in spring 2017, and was completed in 2018.

== Marketing ==
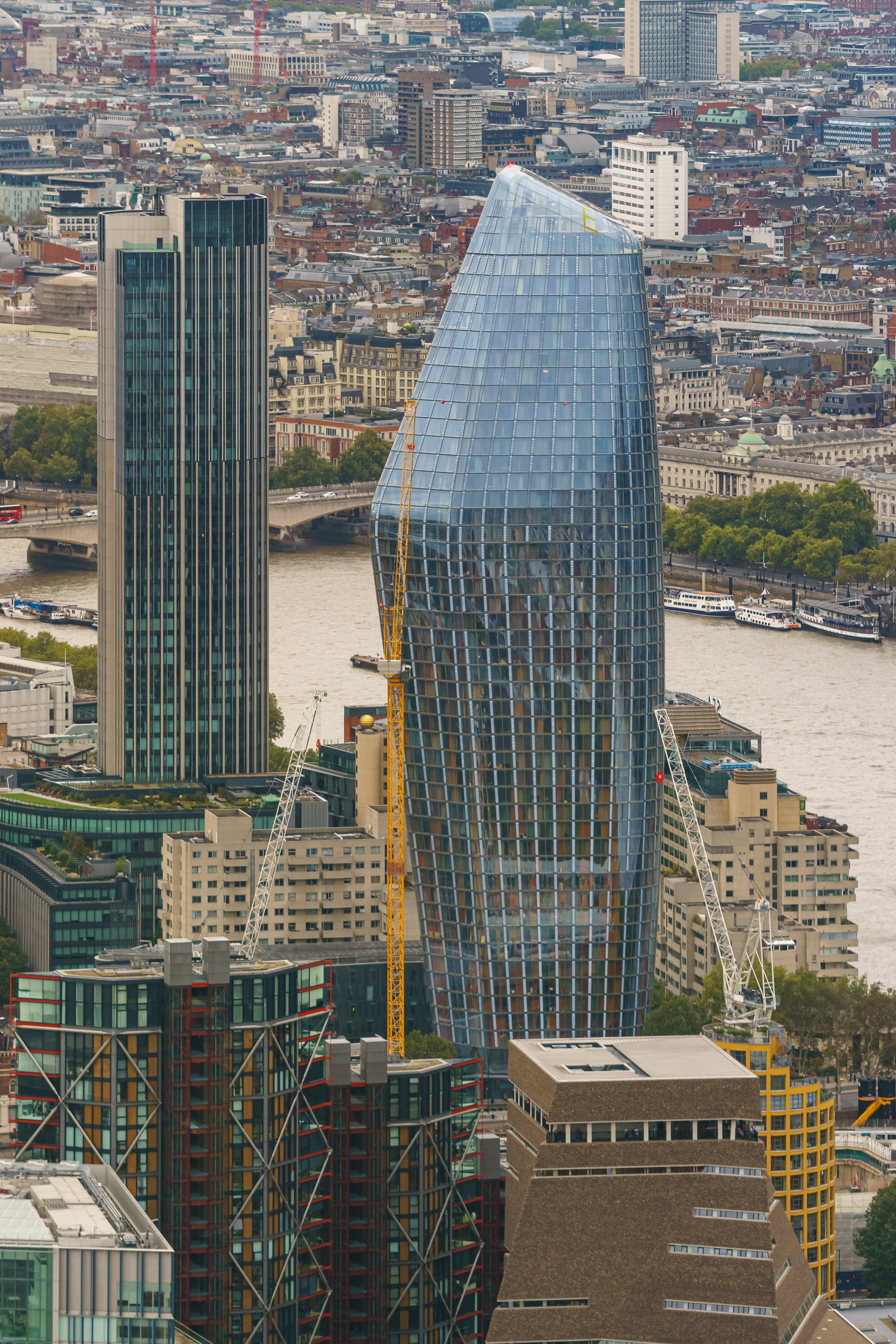
View from The Shard

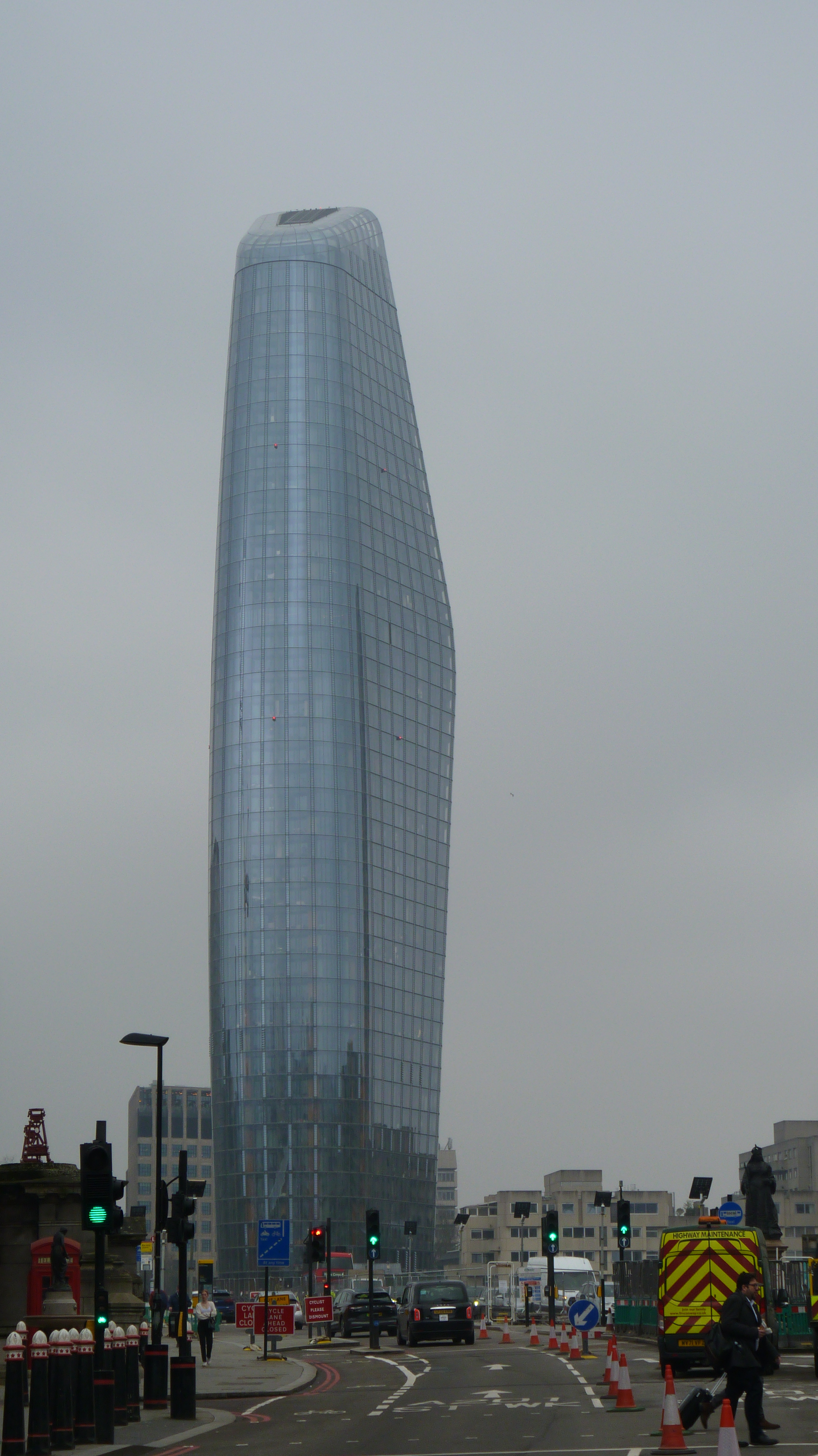
View looking south from Blackfriars Station

In January 2015, a sales and marketing video for the development was swiftly ridiculed on social media and reported by the professional media, and was promptly withdrawn.

== See also ==
- Tall buildings in London
