= Ian Simpson (architect) =

English architect

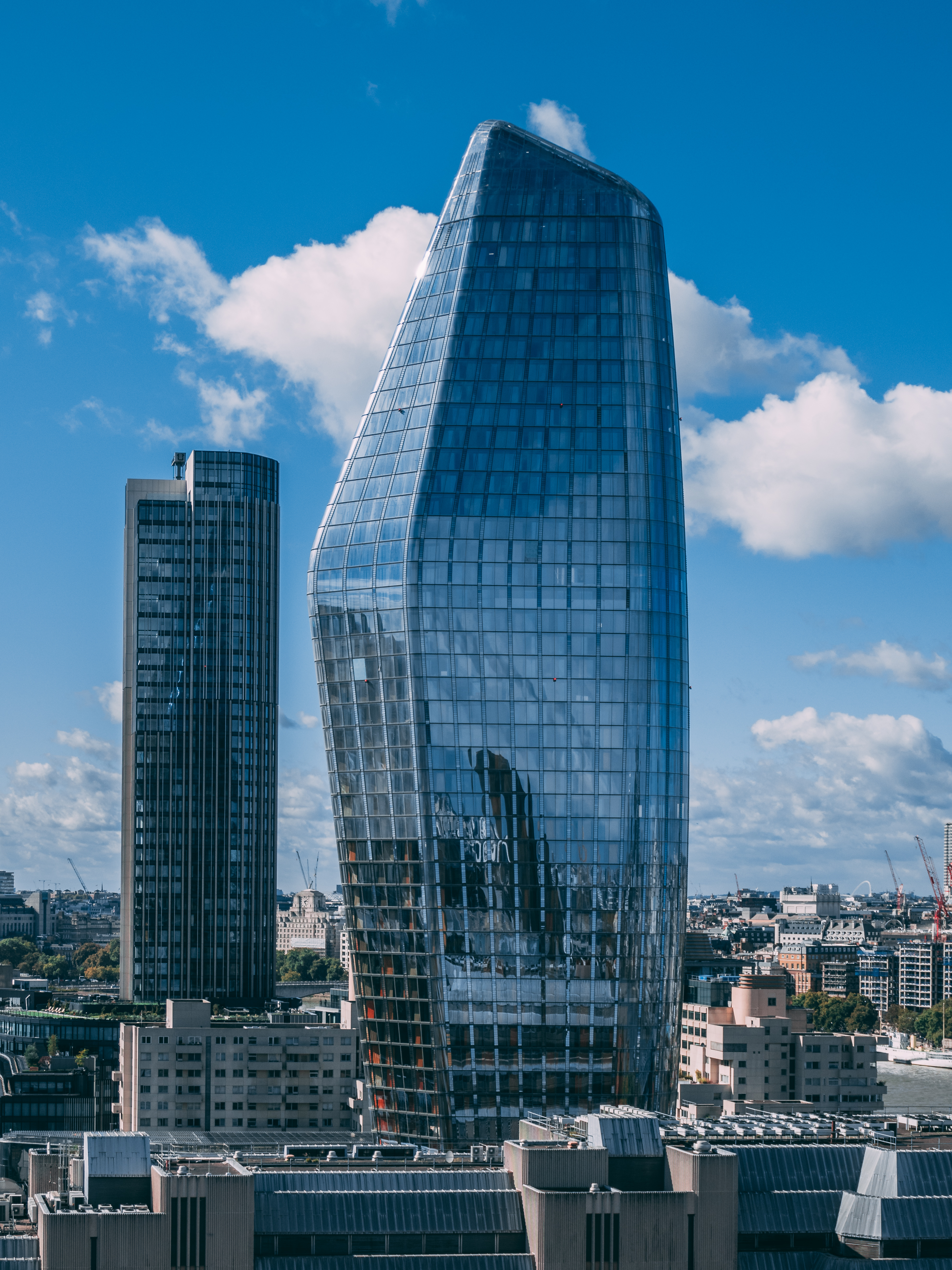
One Blackfriars, London

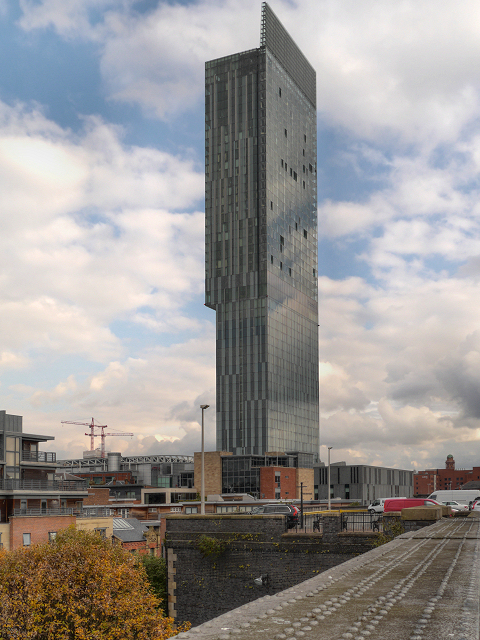
Beetham Tower, Manchester

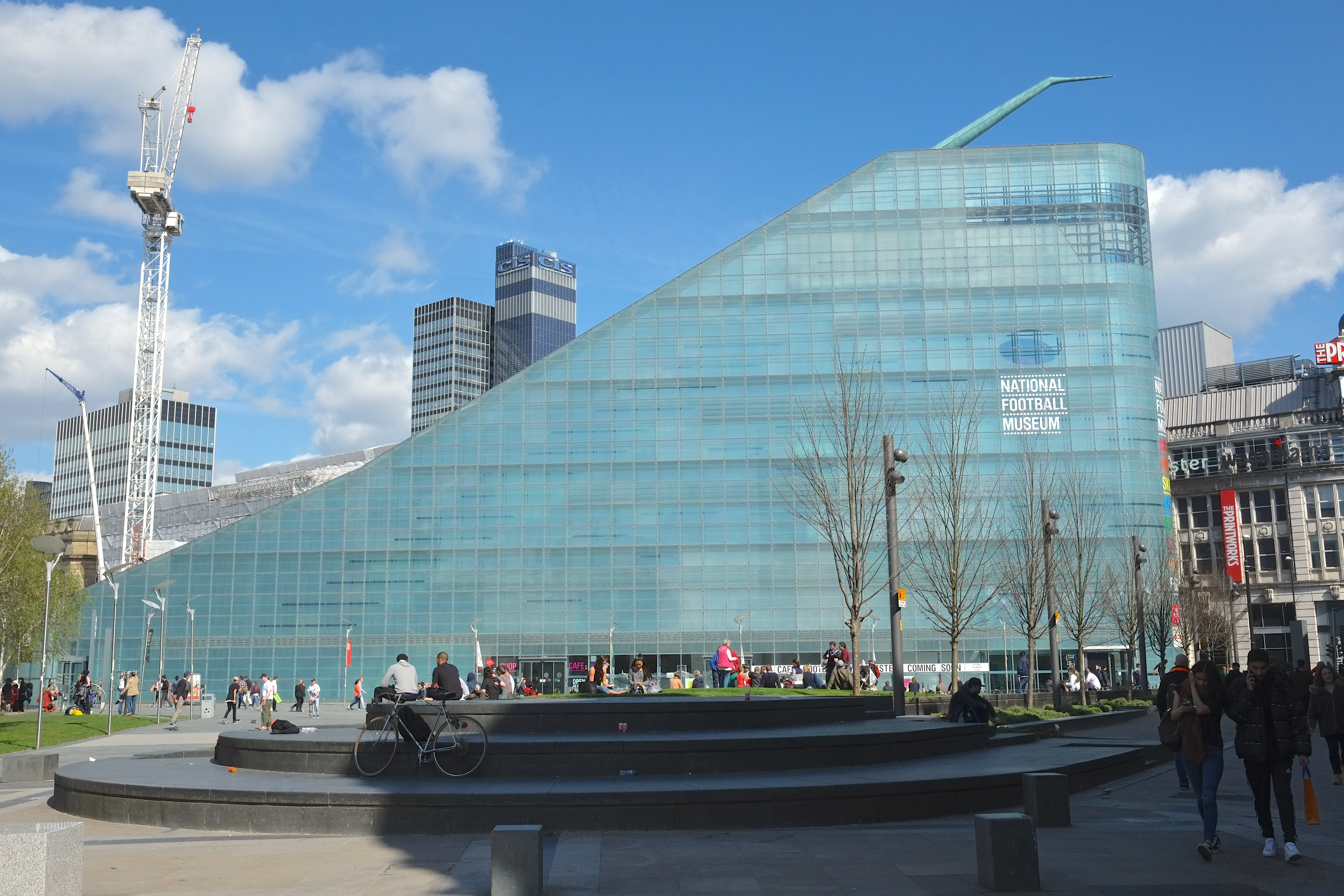
Urbis, Manchester

Ian Simpson (born c. 1955) is an English architect and one of the partners of SimpsonHaugh, established in 1987 with Rachel Haugh (as Ian Simpson Architects).

== Biography ==
=== Early life ===
Ian Simpson was born and brought up in Heywood, near Rochdale, the oldest of six children. His father was a demolition contractor. Excelling in art and woodwork at school, he claims he knew he wanted to be an architect from age 12.

=== Education and career ===
He studied architecture at Liverpool Polytechnic and after he completed his studies he left to work in London with Foster and Partners.

After three years, he moved back to Manchester and set up Ian Simpson Architects with Rachel Haugh. Simpson's lecturer’s post at Manchester University paid the bills; the practice wouldn’t make a profit for almost ten years. The first projects were in Manchester, including the Green Room theatre, a nine-year project with Manchester Museum and work on Ducie House and in Castlefield, where the practice is still based. These brought Simpson to the attention of Sir Howard Bernstein and the city council.

==== Council development guidelines ====
In the early nineties, the City Council tasked a new group to look at urban design principles for the city and produce a guide for developers. The group was convened and led by article Lesley Chalmers, Chief Executive of Hulme Regeneration Ltd (a Manchester public/private regeneration partnership), following her facilitation of "A Guide to Development" for Hulme, published in 1994. She gathered together a dozen development and regeneration professionals (and two academics in the field) and organised a structured series of site visits and discussion meetings to draft the "Guide to Development in Manchester" (published January 2007). Ian Simpson was a member of the group, as was Nick Johnson, later to become CEO of Urban Splash.

When the IRA bomb struck in the City Centre in 1996, the text to the Guide was completed and agreed by the Council, awaiting illustration and formal publication. The Guide, which shortly afterwards adopted as Supplementary Planning Document and Planning Guidance (SPD) was issued as part of the Council's brief for production of a masterplan for the reconstruction of the city centre. Ian Simpson Architects joined the team led by EDAW, chosen after open competition. Simpson's local knowledge and his strategy to grasp the opportunity to expand the city centre formed the core of the proposals.

==== Later career ====
In 2013, Simpson brought in experienced Manchester architect Roger Stephenson, whose own practice went into administration, helping him set up a new studio within the practice which will concentrate on projects at a different scale and type to Simpson and Haugh’s work.

In 2014 Ian Simpson Architects rebranded to SimpsonHaugh.

=== Personal life ===
In 2002 he moved in to live in a large apartment at No1 Deansgate, a new building he designed as part of the post-IRA bomb city centre reconstruction. He now lives with his long-term partner Jo Farrell and their son in the penthouse at the top of The Beetham Tower. He designed the building (described as "the UK’s first proper skyscraper outside London") and bought the top two floors (48th and 49th) as a 12,500 square foot shell before construction started. He was interviewed in his home by Daon Bruni for weekly online magazine Fashion Art and Design Weekly in August 2013. The apartment includes an olive grove: 30 mature trees were hoisted up by crane before the roof was completed. The views extend to 56 km in clear weather.

== Posts Held ==
- Lecturer at Manchester School of Architecture 1987–1994
- External examiner for the London South Bank University and Newcastle University
- Vice President (Architecture) for Liverpool John Moores University Design Academy.
- Board Member for Oldham and Rochdale Housing Market Renewal (HMR) Pathfinder.
- Fellow of the RSA, The Royal Society for the encouragement of Arts, Manufactures and Commerce.
