= Beetham Organization =

Privately owned property development and investment company based in Liverpool, UK

Coordinates: 53.4099°N 2.9965°W

Beetham Organisation Ltd
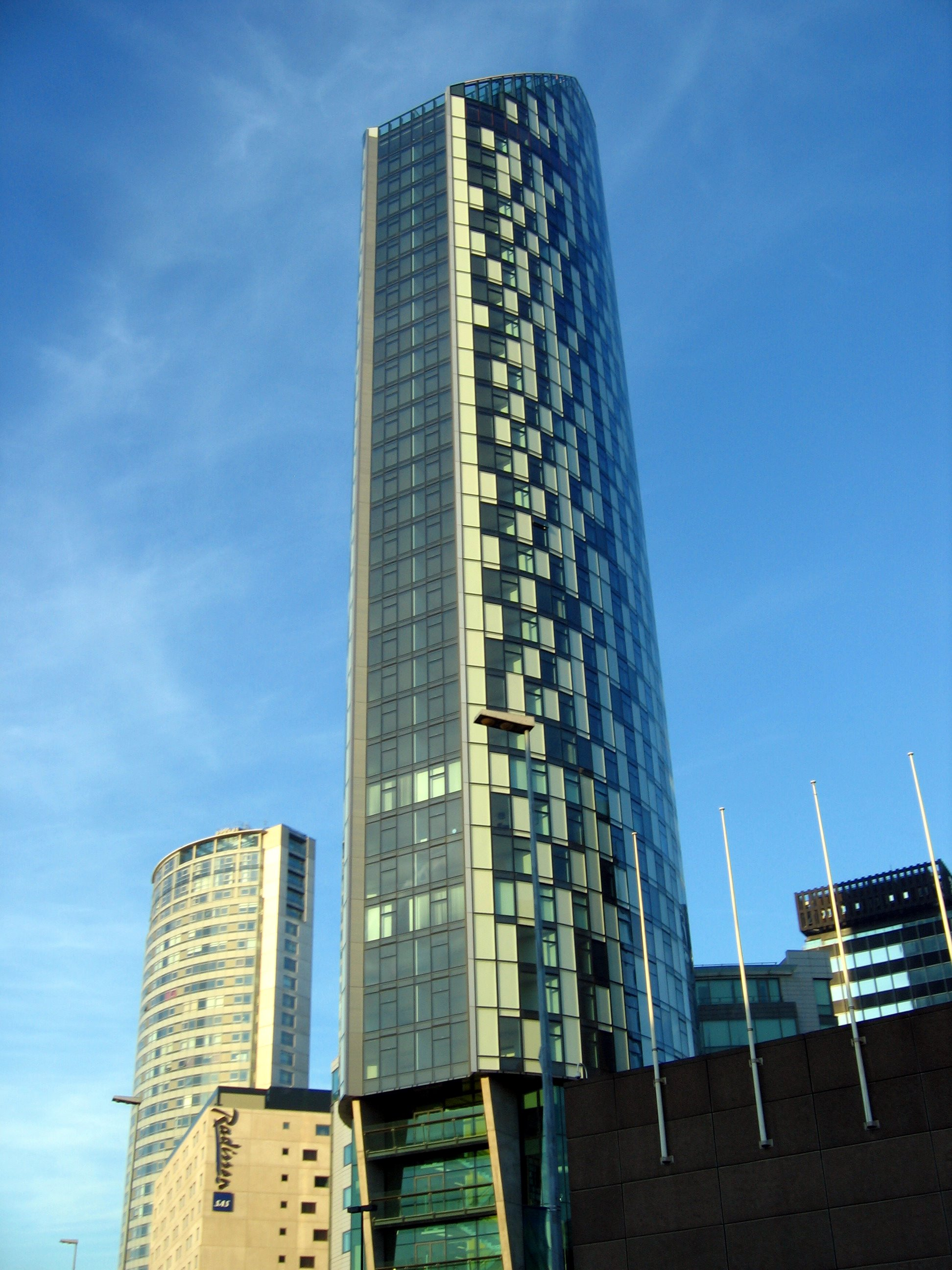
- Beetham Tower and West Tower in Liverpool were both built by the Beetham Organisation
- Type: Private
- Industry: Real estate
- Founded: 1985 as Oastdren Investments
- Founder: Hugh Frost
- Headquarters: West Tower, Liverpool, UK
- Area served: United Kingdom
- Key people: Directors: Stephen Beetham, Simon Frost, Hugh Frost; Company secretary: Andrew Gresty
- Products: Property
- Website: http://www.beetham.eu/

The Beetham Organisation is a privately owned property development and investment company based in Liverpool, UK. It was founded by Hugh Frost as Oastdren Investments in 1985. Its primary focus is city-centre real estate, specialising in hotel, residential and office projects. As of 2005, Hugh Frost owned 67%, his sons Stephen Beetham (born Stephen Frost) owned 27%, and Simon Frost held the remaining 6% of the company. Stephen changed his name from Frost to Beetham after joining the sect into which he was born, the Plymouth Brethren. Beetham is an ancestral family name; the name of the business was subsequently changed.

== Portfolio ==
Their portfolio includes;

- Beetham Tower, Liverpool
- 10 Holloway Circus, also known as Beetham Tower, Birmingham, or Holloway Circus Tower
- Beetham Tower, Manchester, also known as the Hilton Tower
- West Tower, also known as Beetham Tower West, Liverpool
- Beetham Tower, Brighton
- One Blackfriars, London, known locally as the Vase.
