= Penang Plaza =

Shopping mall in George Town, Penang, Malaysia

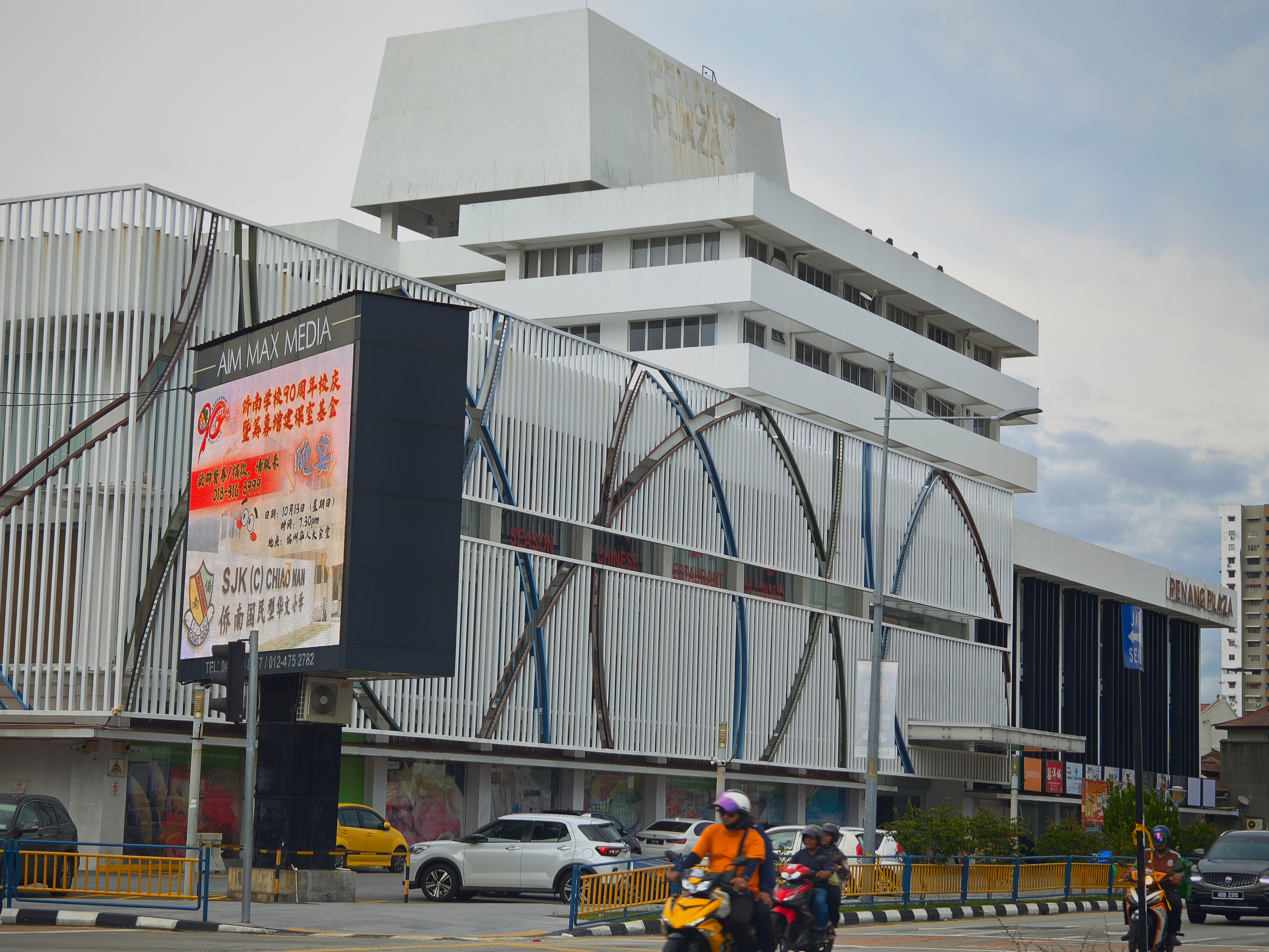
- Location: George Town, Penang
- Coordinates: 5.42146°N 100.325°E
- Address: 126, Burmah Road, 10050 George Town, Penang, Malaysia
- Opened: 1982
- Floor area: 138,222 ft^{2} (12,841.2 m^{2})
- Floors: 10
- Parking: 88

Penang Plaza is a shopping mall within George Town in the Malaysian state of Penang. Located at Burmah Road within the city's Central Business District (CBD), the 10-storey 138,222 sq ft (12,841.2 m^{2}) retail complex was the city's first shopping mall. Completed in 1982, it comprises three retail floors, a seven-storey tower that accommodates offices and maintenance spaces, and 88 car park bays.

The mall serves as an annexe to the adjacent Hotel Royal. Giant is the main anchor tenant of the mall, which has experienced declining footfall due to the emergence of newer shopping malls throughout the city.

== History ==
Penang Plaza was built in 1982, making it the first shopping mall in Penang. It preceded the completions of Komtar^{α} and Island Plaza^{β}, although GAMA Supermarket & Departmental Store had been opened in 1967. Penang Plaza, Komtar and GAMA emerged as the three primary shopping destinations of George Town by the late 1980s.

Both the mall and the adjacent 21-storey Dorsett Penang Hotel were owned by local real estate company Faber Kompleks. The hotel was managed by Dorsett Hospitality International, a subsidiary of Hong Kong-based Far East Consortium. Dorsett Penang Hotel was reportedly the first Dorsett hotel that was managed without ownership of the property.

In 2008, Hotel Royal Limited, a Singapore-based hospitality company, acquired both Penang Plaza and the adjacent hotel. Penang Plaza had a net value of RM18.9 million as of 31 December 2007. The mall underwent renovations from 2009 to 2010.

Despite the refurbishments, it struggled with dwindling foot traffic due to competition from newer shopping malls throughout George Town and was referred to as a "white elephant" by local media. Both the mall and the hotel were also impacted by the COVID-19 pandemic, leading Hotel Royal Limited to lay off hotel staff. However, the mall remained operational for the duration of the pandemic.

== Location ==
Penang Plaza is situated at the junction of Burmah Road and Jalan Larut, within George Town's Central Business District.

== Notes ==
^αKomtar was topped out in 1985.

^βIsland Plaza was opened in 1995.

== See also ==
- List of shopping malls in Malaysia
