= Victoria Riverside =

Residential development in Manchester, England

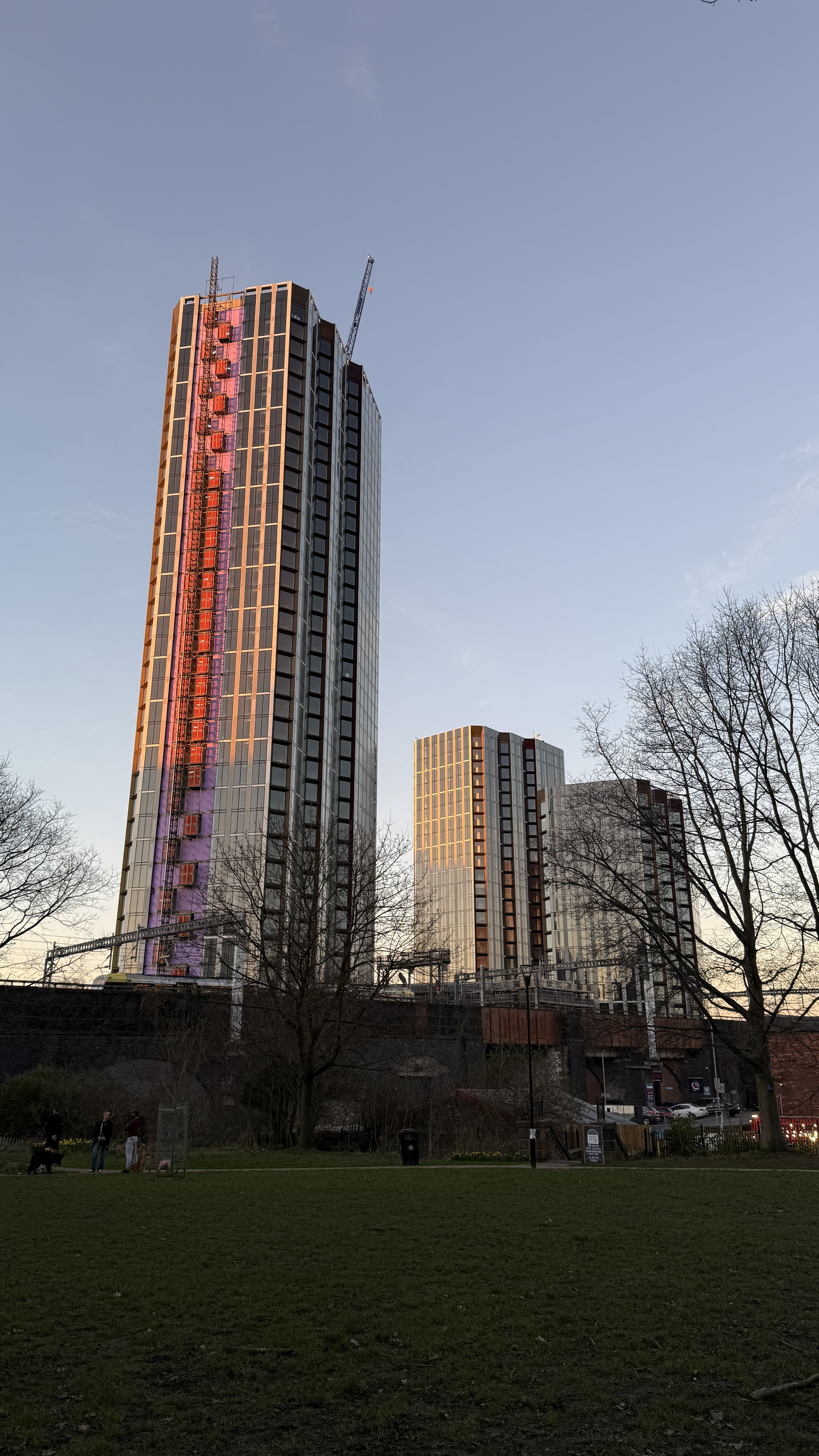
- All three towers in the Victoria Riverside development in March 2025

- Location within Greater Manchester

General information
- Type: Residential high-rises, skyscraper
- Location: Victoria North, Manchester, England
- Coordinates: 53.49122°N 2.23166°W
- Construction started: 2021
- Completed: 2025; 1 year ago
- Cost: £185 million
- Owner: Far East Consortium

Height
- Height: Crown View: 119 m (390 ft)

Technical details
- Floor count: Crown View: 37; Park View: 26; City View: 18

Design and construction
- Architect: Hawkins\Brown
- Main contractor: CR Construction (UK)

Other information
- Number of units: 634

Website
- victoriariverside.co.uk

Victoria Riverside is a residential development in the Red Bank area of Manchester, England. It comprises 634 homes across three towers linked by podiums: the 18-storey City View, the 26-storey Park View and the 37-storey Crown View. The towers were designed by Hawkins\Brown architects. At a height of 119 metres (390 ft), Crown View is the 18th-tallest building in Greater Manchester as of August 2026.

The development is a joint venture between the developer Far East Consortium and Manchester City Council, and is one of the first to be constructed within the wider Victoria North masterplan to build 15,000 homes over 15–20 years.

== History ==
=== Planning ===
A planning application for three towers was submitted to Manchester City Council in May 2020, as part of the then-named Northern Gateway masterplan. Planning approval was obtained in January 2021. In March 2021, the masterplan area of which Victoria Riverside was to form part was renamed Victoria North.

The Victoria Riverside development occupies the former Angelgate site, a project that encountered significant difficulties and controversy following the collapse of both the developer, Pinnacle, and the main contractor, PHD1.

=== Construction ===
In 2021 the construction contractor CR Construction (UK) was appointed to build the three towers.

Park View and City View towers were topped out in early 2023; the third and tallest tower, Crown View, was topped out in November of that year. City View contains 128 apartments, all of which are classed as affordable. In July 2024, the development was expected to complete in early 2025.

== Amenities ==
Crown View tower includes approximately 4,500 sq ft (420 m^{2}) of amenity floorspace comprising co-working spaces, a gym and yoga studio, a bar and lounge, and a private dining area.

== See also ==
- List of tallest buildings and structures in Greater Manchester
- List of tallest buildings in the United Kingdom
