= Victoria North =

Victoria North could refer to:

- Victoria North (federal electoral district) in Ontario, Canada, abolished in 1903
- Victoria North (provincial electoral district) in Ontario, Canada, abolished in 1933
- Victoria North, Manchester, new town in Greater Manchester, England
