= Dorsett Wanchai Hong Kong Hotel =

Hotel in Wan Chai, Hong Kong

Coordinates: 22.27468°N 114.17887°E

Dorsett Wanchai Hong Kong

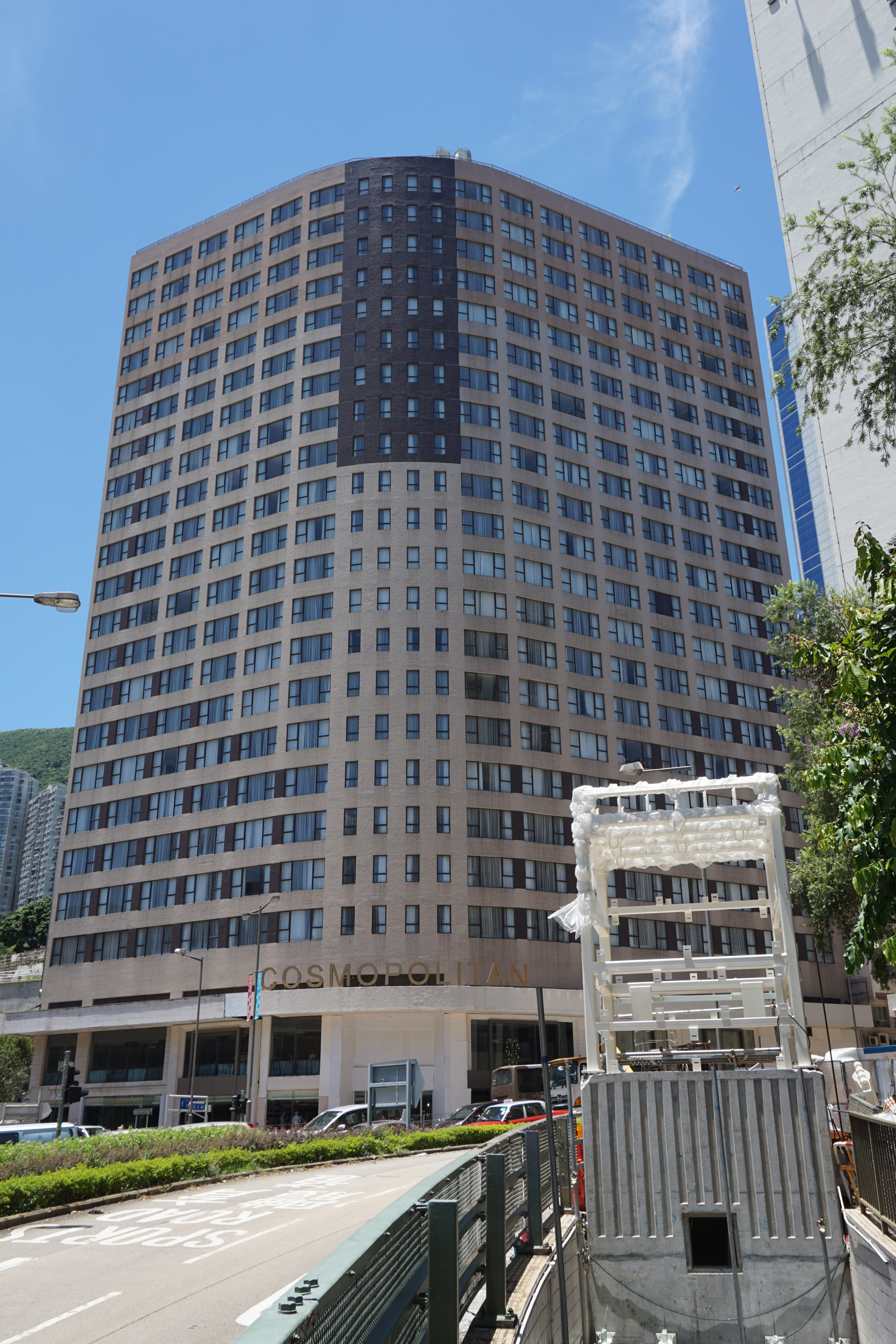
- Interactive map of the Dorsett Wanchai Hong Kong area

General information
- Location: 387-397 Queen's Road East, Wan Chai, Hong Kong
- Opened: 2004; 22 years ago
- Management: Dorsett Hospitality International

Technical details
- Floor count: 25

Other information
- Number of rooms: 454
- Number of suites: 19
- Number of restaurants: 1

Website
- https://www.wanchai.dorsetthotels.com/

Dorsett Wanchai Hong Kong Hotel
- Traditional Chinese: 香港灣仔帝盛酒店
- Simplified Chinese: 香港湾仔帝盛酒店
Transcriptions
Standard Mandarin
- Hanyu Pinyin: Xiānggǎng Wān Zǎi Dì Shèng Jiǔdiàn
Yue: Cantonese
- Jyutping: hoeng1 gong2 waan1 zai2 dai3 sing6 zau2 dim3

Dorsett Wanchai Hong Kong Hotel (formerly Cosmopolitan Hotel Hong Kong) is a 454-room 4.5-star hotel located on 387–397 Queen's Road East, midway between Wan Chai and Causeway Bay while opposite of Happy Valley Racecourse in Hong Kong Island. The hotel has been recently awarded the TripAdvisor's Travellers’ Choice 2020. It is also a 2019 EarthCheck Silver Certified green hotel with 100% smoke-free guest floors.

The Dorsett Wanchai Hotel is one of the participating hotels of the membership program Dorsett-Your Rewards, which belongs to Dorsett Hospitality International.

== History ==
The building was originally built to be a hotel, but bought by and formerly used by Xinhua News Agency Hong Kong Branch before it finished. After 1997, Xinhua News Agency Hong Kong Branch became the Liaison Office of the Central People's Government in the Hong Kong Special Administrative Region. After the liaison office moved to Sai Ying Pun in 2001, Far East Consortium International Limited took over the building and refurbished it as a hotel. The hotel, originally named Cosmopolitan Hotel Hong Kong, was renamed Dorsett Wanchai Hong Kong Hotel and renovated in 2016, as one of the hotels under Dorsett Hotels & Resorts of Dorsett Hospitality International.
