= St Catherine's Wood =

Park in Manchester, England

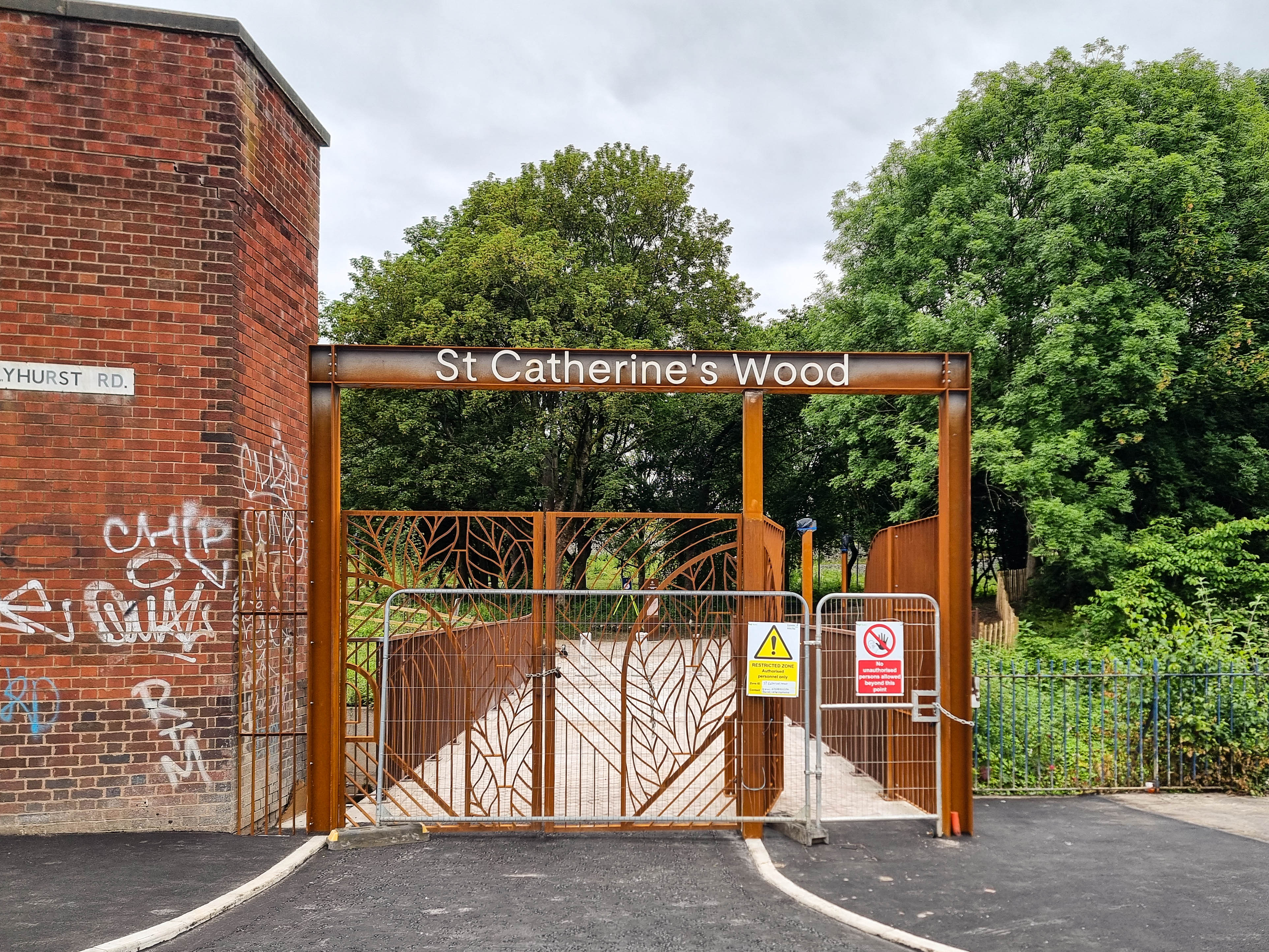
- Entrance to the park in June 2026
- Interactive map of St Catherine's Wood
- Type: Urban park
- Location: Collyhurst Road, Manchester, England
- Coordinates: 53.4926°N 2.2315°W
- Area: 2.7 acres (1.1 ha)
- Created: July 2026; 2 months ago

St Catherine's Wood is an urban park off Collyhurst Road and alongside the River Irk in Manchester, England. Covering 2.7 acres (1.1 ha), it is the most recent new green space to open in the city, following the creation of Mayfield Park in 2022. Named after the former St Catherine's Church, the park is surrounded by land that was historically industrial and later used for railway sidings and storage yards. Developed as part of the Victoria North regeneration programme, it opened to the public on 24 July 2026 and forms the first completed element of a planned network of new parks.

== Toponymy ==
The park takes its name from St Catherine's Church, which once stood nearby. The church closed in 1966 and was later demolished.

== History ==
The land surrounding the park was historically industrial, with dyeworks and mills operating along the River Irk. It was later incorporated into Manchester's railway infrastructure, becoming the site of sidings, storage yards and associated buildings, uses that continued into the 20th century before the area was cleared for redevelopment.

Designed by landscape architects Planit, the park forms part of the wider Victoria North regeneration, which will create seven linked green spaces and around 15,000 new homes on former industrial land. It also represents the first stage of a planned 113-acre (46 ha) network of connected parks, with later phases expected to introduce play facilities as new housing is delivered.

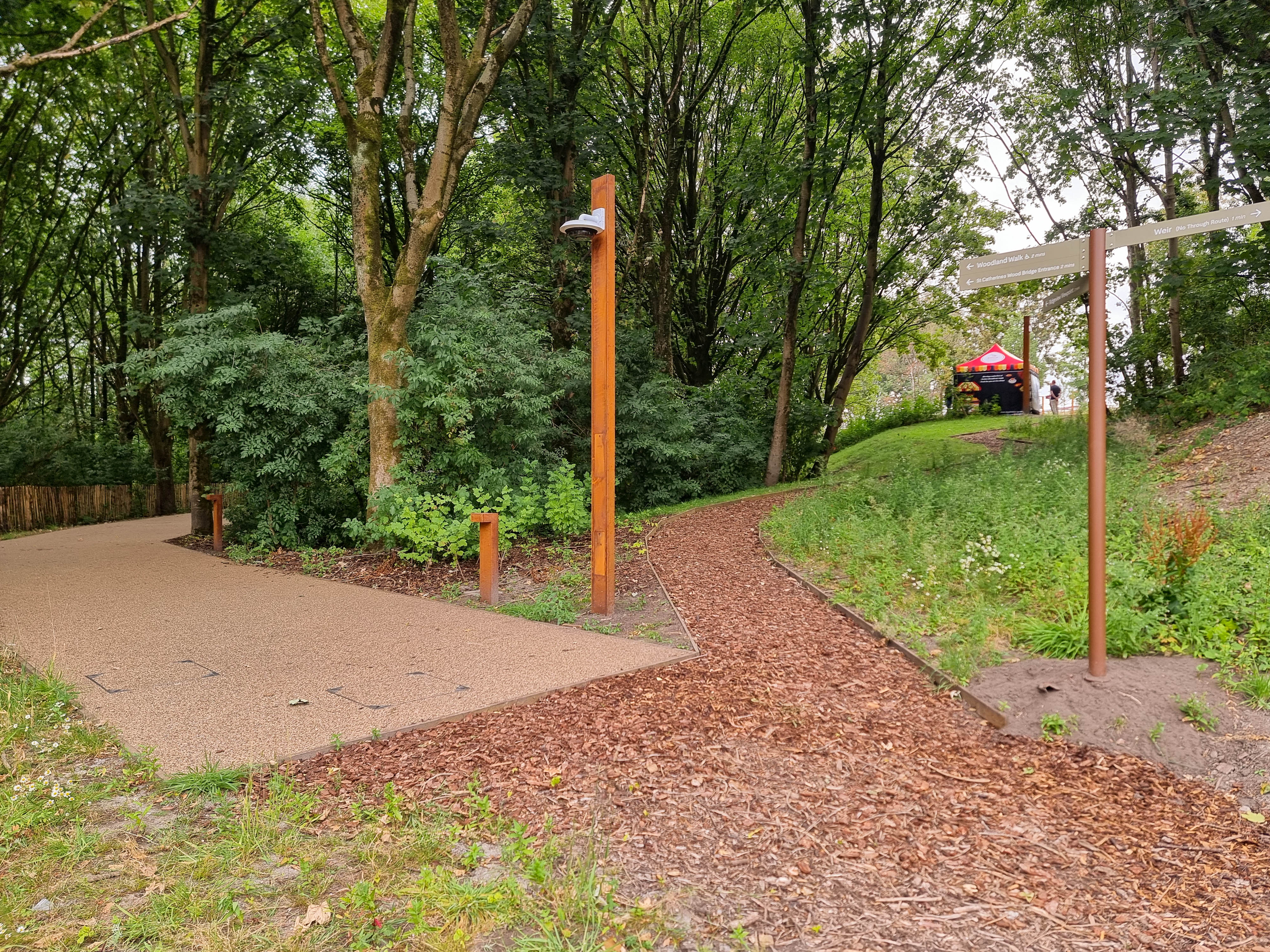
Paths within the wood

The park was funded in part through a £51.6 million Housing Infrastructure Fund grant from Homes England, used to unlock the wider development area for new homes and public space. A further contribution from the £6.93 million brownfield fund from the Greater Manchester Combined Authority supported delivery of the first phase of the City River Park programme.

St Catherine's Wood opened to the public on 24 July 2026, with Manchester City Council and the Victoria North development partner FEC formally unveiling the new park to local residents. It is the newest park to be created in Manchester since the opening of Mayfield Park in September 2022.

The park forms a component of the CyanLines initiative, a strategic urban greening and connectivity programme aimed at establishing a 100-mile (160 km) network of linked parks, waterways, and pedestrian routes across Greater Manchester.

== Features ==
The park includes accessible paths edged with gabion walls that climb through the woodland to a raised plateau, reached by stepped circular routes and open areas designed for informal use and small gatherings. The park incorporates metal and stone elements intended to reference the area's industrial heritage. Three Manchester poplar trees, an endangered local form of the black poplar, have been planted as part of the scheme.
