= Consort Place =

Mixed-use development in London, England

Coordinates: 51.500912°N 0.022521°W

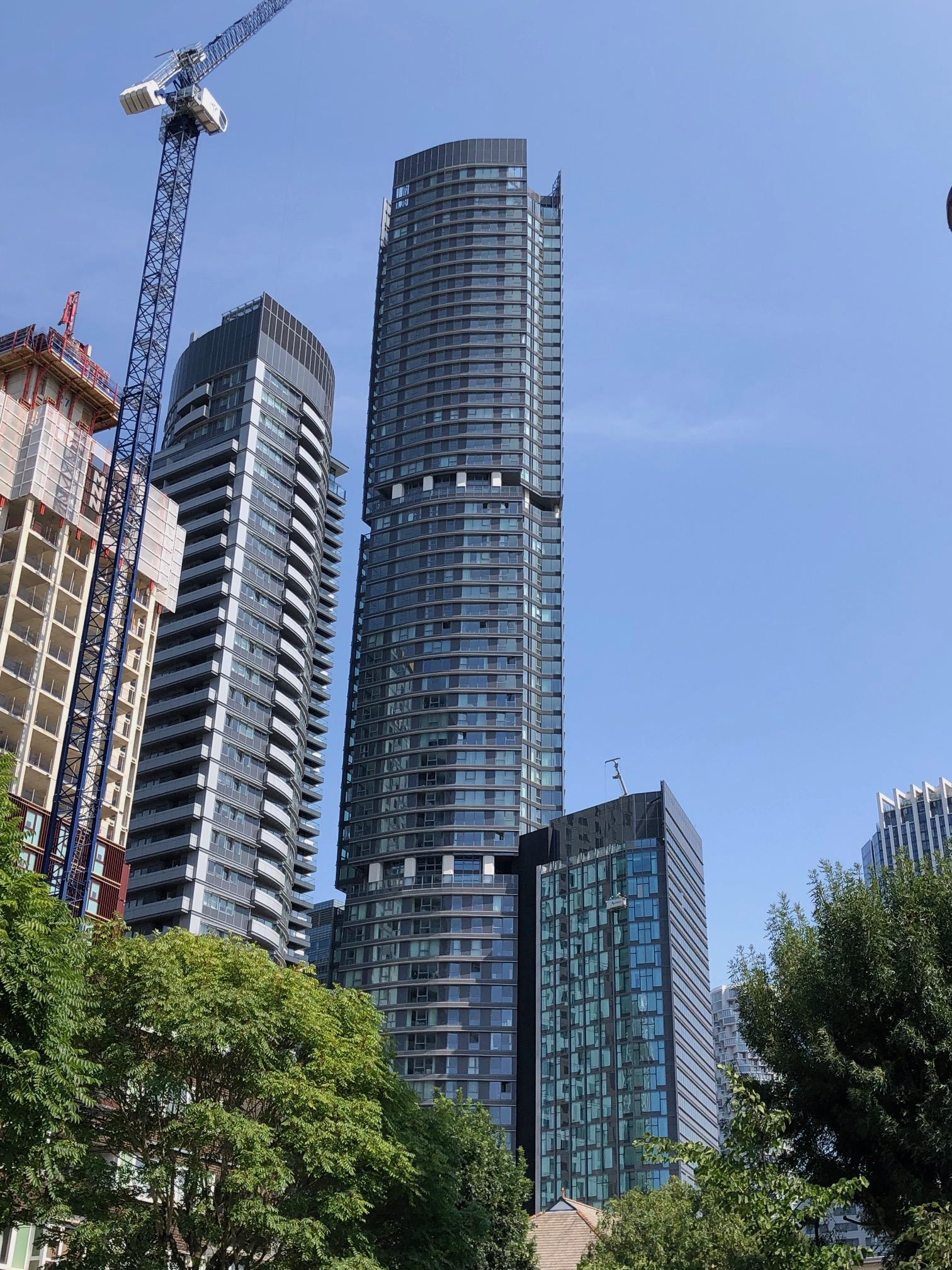
- Consort Place in August 2025

General information
- Status: Completed
- Type: Mixed-use
- Location: London, E14; United Kingdom, 50 Marsh Wall
- Opening: 2025
- Client: Far East Consortium (FEC)

Height
- Height: Aspen Tower 215.8 m (708 ft); Alta Tower 121.8 m (400 ft)

Technical details
- Floor count: 20/34/65

Design and construction
- Architects: Pilbrow and Partners

Consort Place, formerly known as Alpha Square, is a mixed-use development in the Isle of Dogs, London, England, south of the financial estate of Canary Wharf.

Original plans for the development were withdrawn by the developer in 2015 following a recommendation to refuse the scheme by Tower Hamlets Development Committee. Revised plans were submitted in 2015 which were rejected by Tower Hamlets Council in February 2016. The then Mayor of London Boris Johnson called in the scheme in early 2016 which gave him the authority to reject or allow the proposals. It was approved on 27 April 2016.

Consort Place is a mixed-use 80,000-square-metre (860,000 sq ft) development project, which has a gross development value of £470 million and is planned by the Hong Kong developer, Far East Consortium (FEC). It comprises three key buildings:

- Aspen at Consort Place: the taller east tower, standing at 65 storeys (217 metres (712 ft)) with 495 new apartments, is the third-tallest residential building in Canary Wharf. The building has won Mixed Use Development - London at the International Property Awards 2023-2024.
- Alta at Consort Place: the lower west tower, standing at 34 storeys (124 metres (407 ft)), offers 139 affordable homes. All shared ownership apartments at Alta are between the 25th and 32nd floor. These homes received Highly Commended for Best Medium Development at the First Time Buyer Awards 2023.
- Dorsett Aspen Canary Wharf Hotel: the 231-room four-star international hotel occupies 20 storeys (80 metres (260 ft)).

Additionally, the development features a new public square with ancillary amenities, ground floor retail space, a health centre, and a new school. The North Pole, a 160-year-old pub, has also been restored and reopened.

== Gallery ==
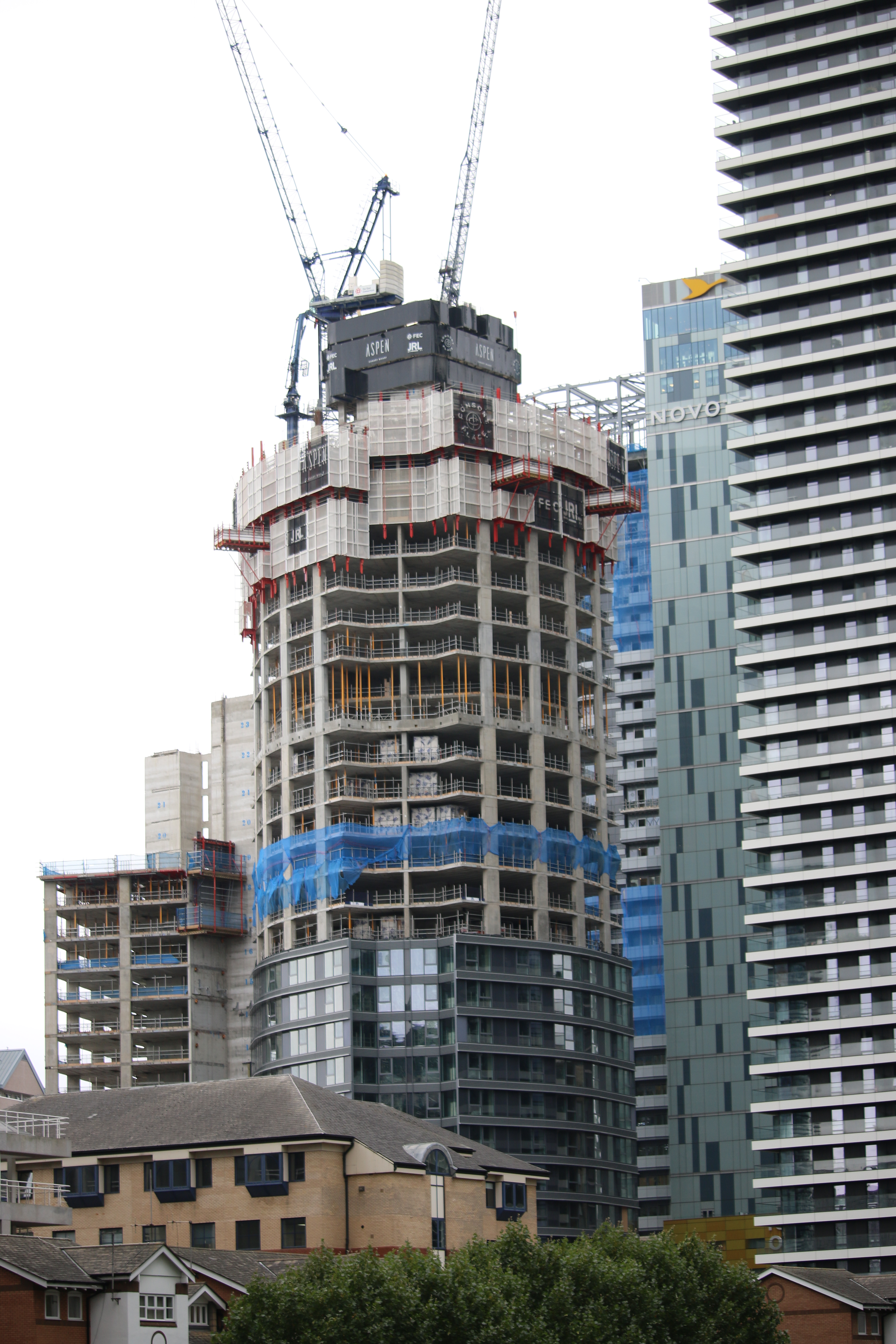
Aspen at Consort Place, October 2022

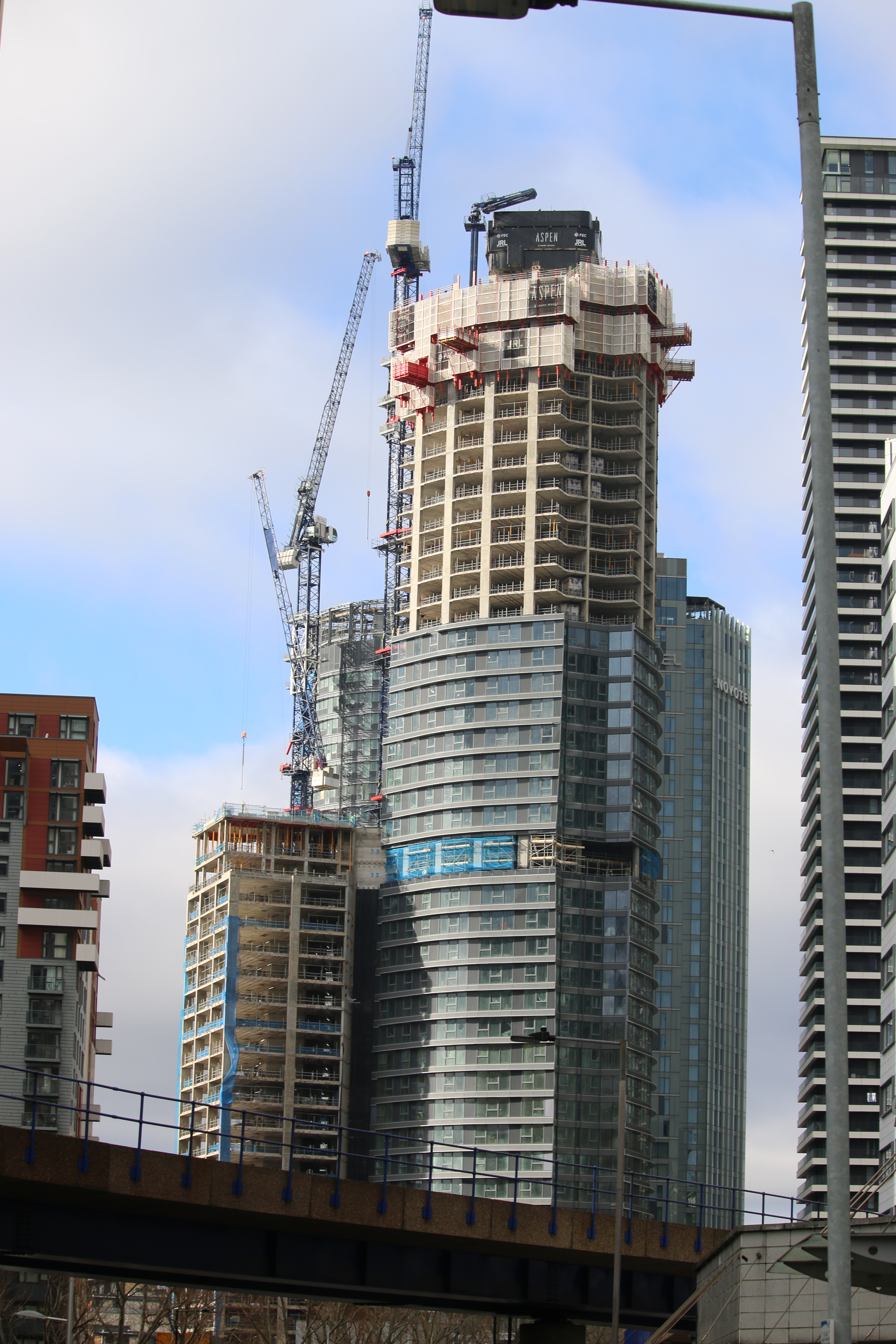
Aspen at Consort Place, February 2023

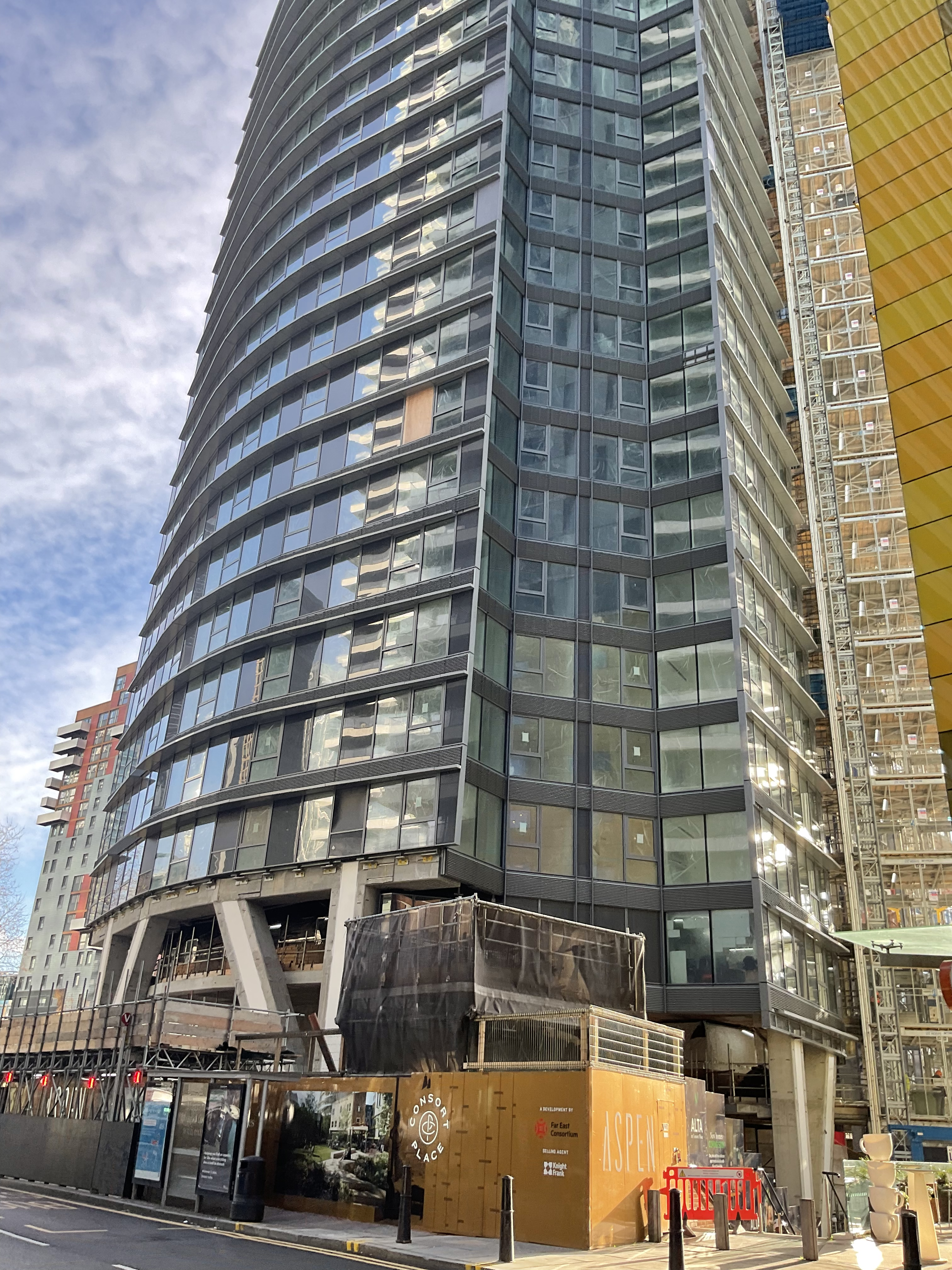
Aspen at Consort Place, February 2023

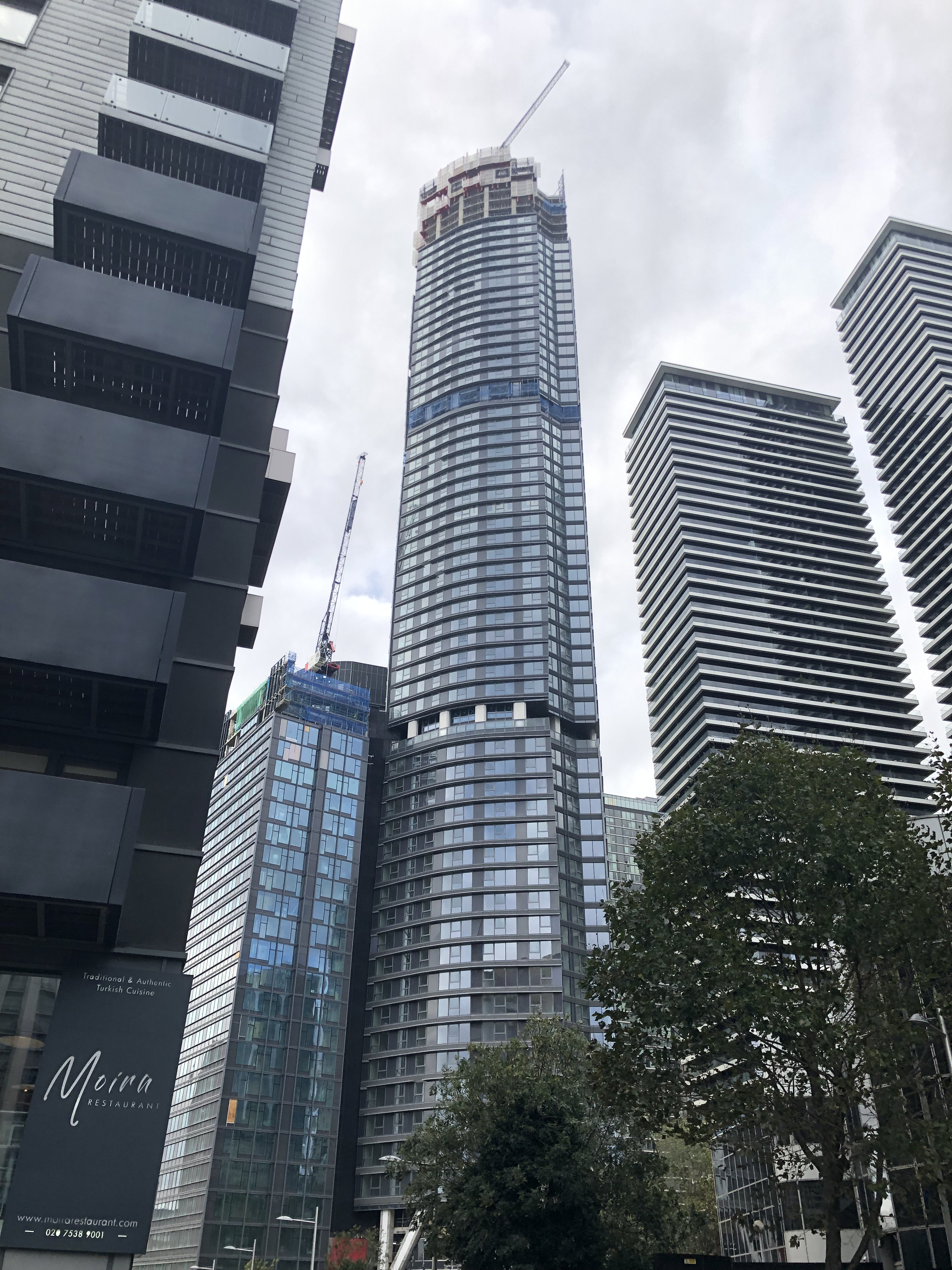
Aspen at Consort Place, October 2023

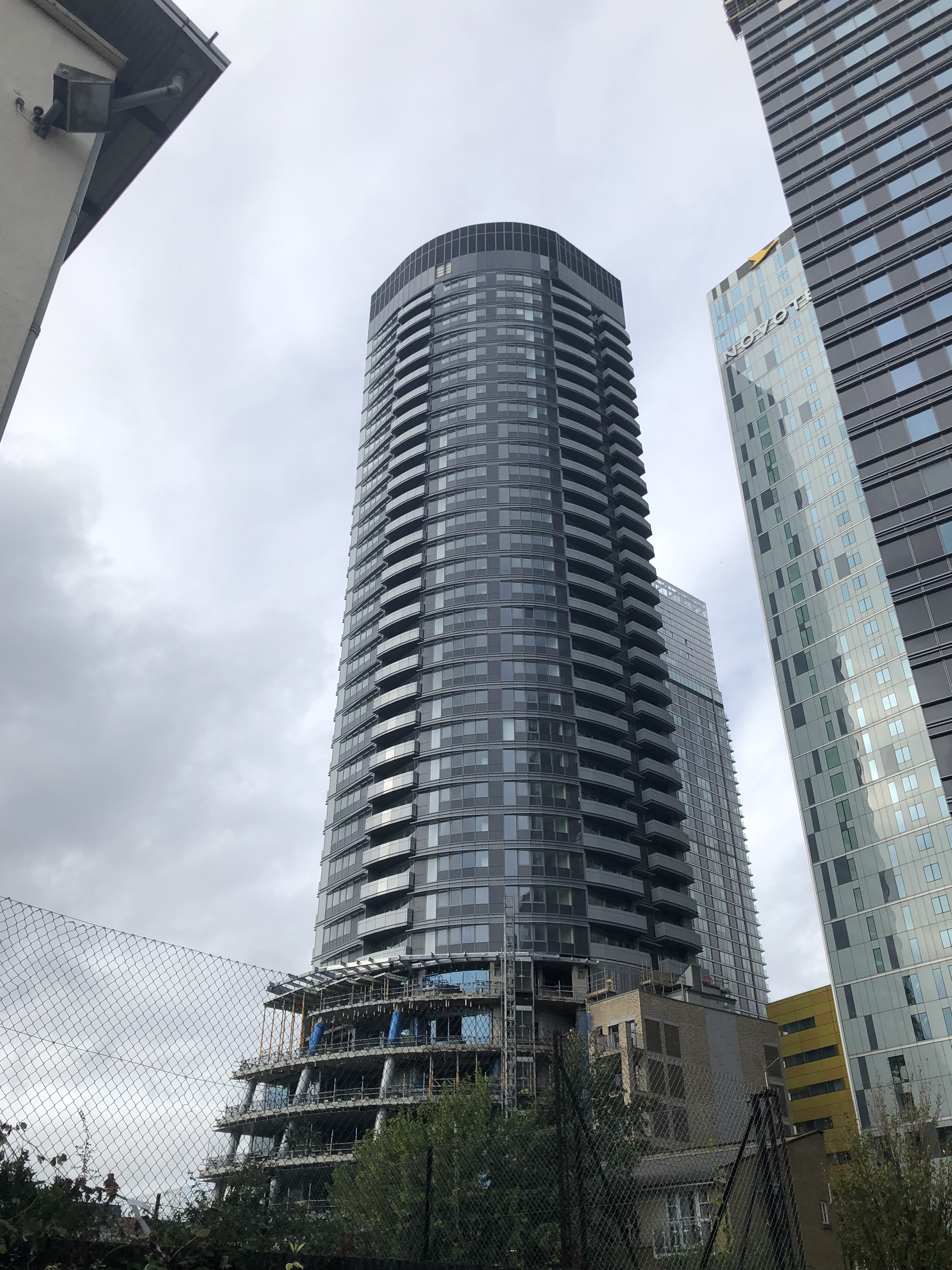
Alta at Consort, October 2023

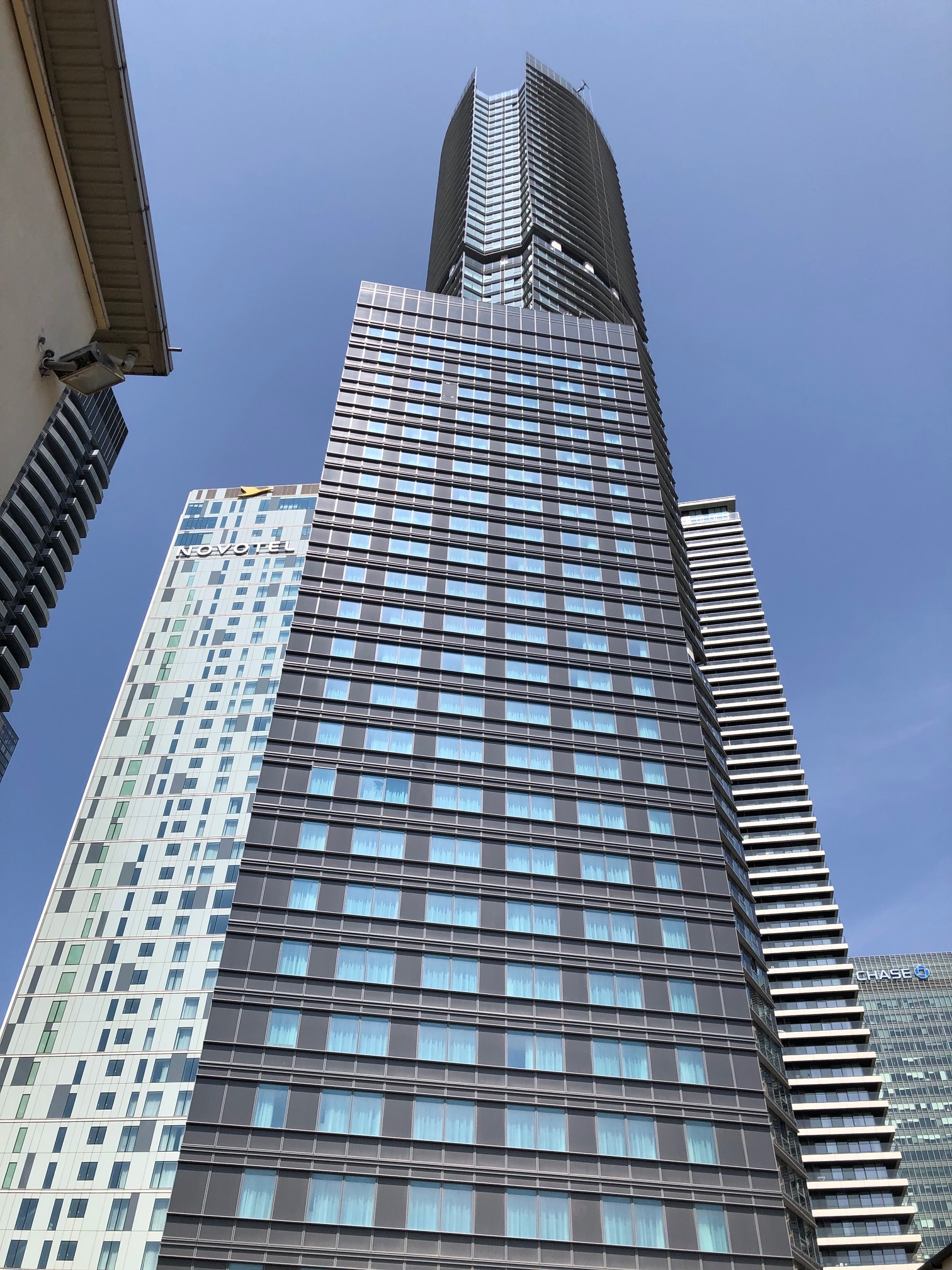
Consort Place, August 2025

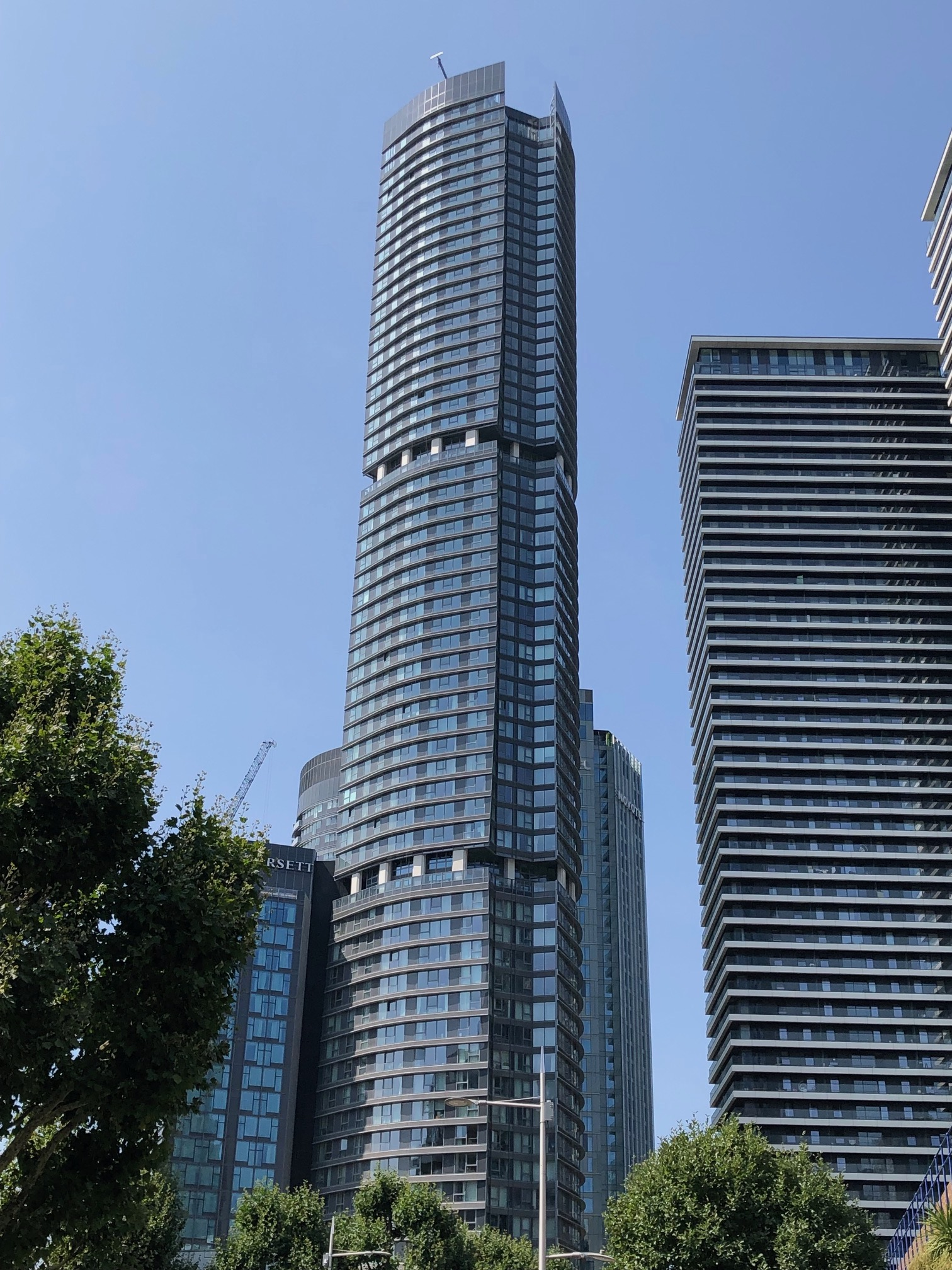
Aspen at Consort Place, August 2025

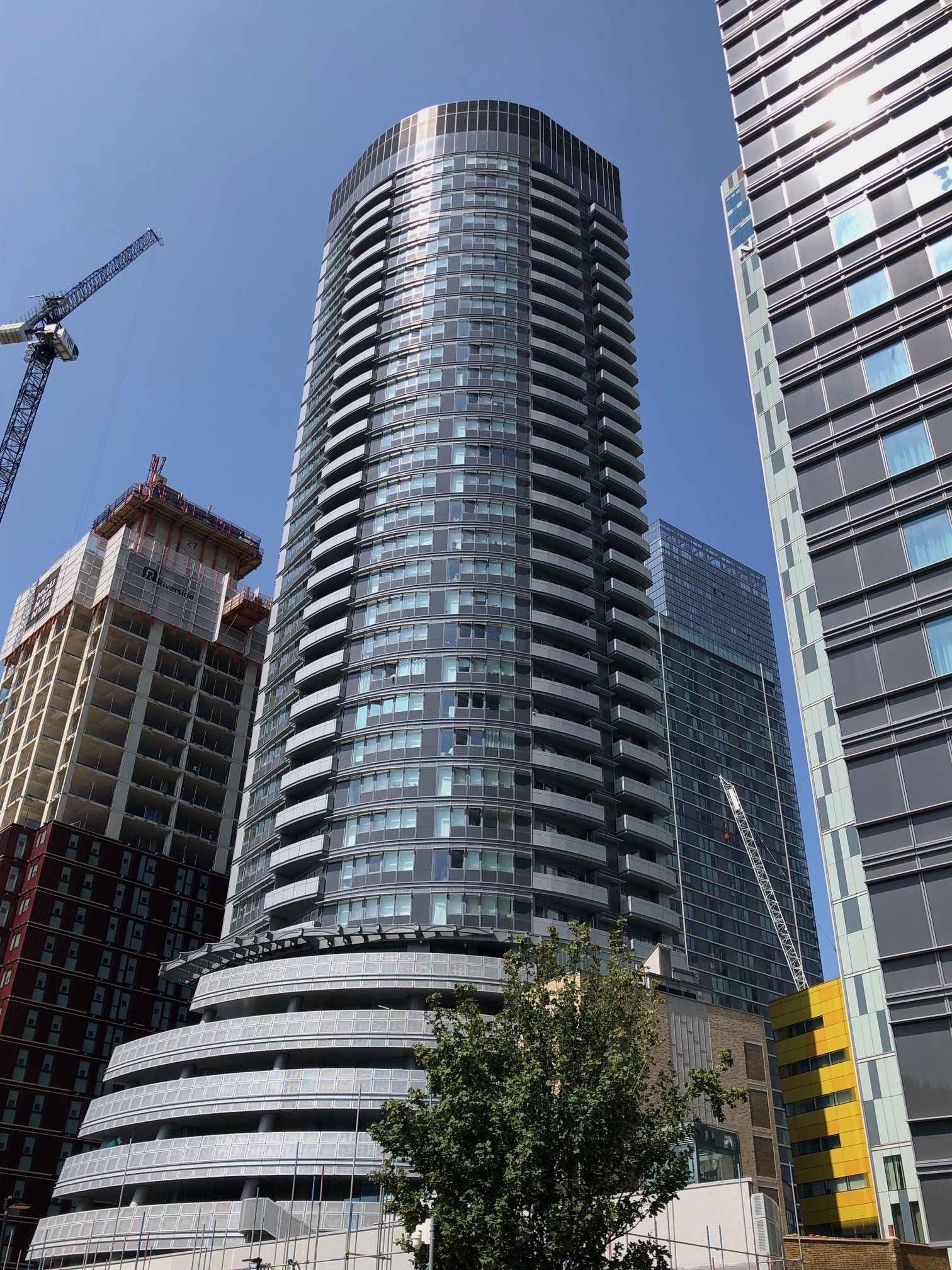
Alta at Consort Place August 2025

== See also ==
- List of tallest buildings and structures in London

== Design Team ==
Midgard / JRL Group EDC- Engineering Design Consultants Pilbrow & Partners WSP Outerspace
