= Tanjong Tokong =

- Suburb of George Town
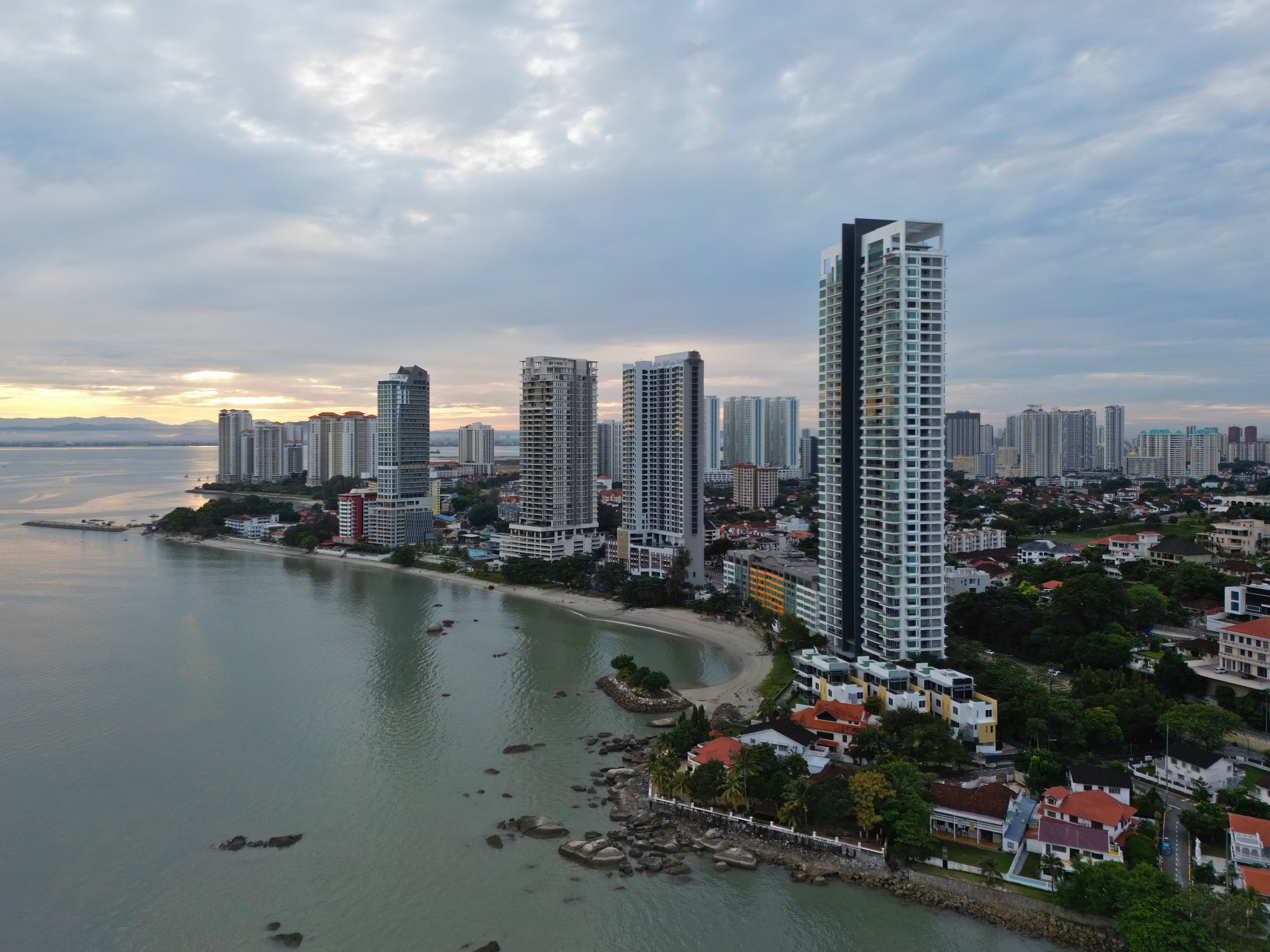

- Location within George Town in Penang
- Coordinates: 5°27′4.42″N 100°18′19.69″E
- Country: Malaysia
- State: Penang
- City: George Town
- District: Northeast
- First settled: Mid-18th century
- Founder: Zhang Li
- Named for: Tua Pek Kong

Area
  - Total: 1.5 km^{2} (0.58 sq mi)

Population (2020)
  - Total: 12,550
  - Density: 8,400/km^{2} (22,000/sq mi)

Demographics
  - Ethnic groups: 54.6% Chinese; 33.9% Bumiputera; 33.6% Malay; 0.3% indigenous groups from Sabah and Sarawak; 5.8% Indian; 0.9% Other ethnicities; 4.7% Non-citizens
- Time zone: UTC+8 (MST)
  - Summer (DST): Not observed
- Postal code: 10470

Tanjong Tokong (Note: Also spelt as Tanjung Tokong.) is a suburb of George Town in the Malaysian state of Penang. It is located at the northeastern coast of Penang Island, 4 km (2.5 mi) northwest of the city centre. The suburb is bordered by Tanjong Bungah to the west and Tanjong Pinang to the east.

The suburb was founded in the mid-17th century by Chinese settlers, and was believed to be the site of the first Chinese settlement on Penang Island. It remained a fishing village until the 1970s, when rapid urbanisation from the city centre soon followed. Today, the suburb is lined by residential high rises along the coast, and is known for its relatively upscale standard of living.

== History ==
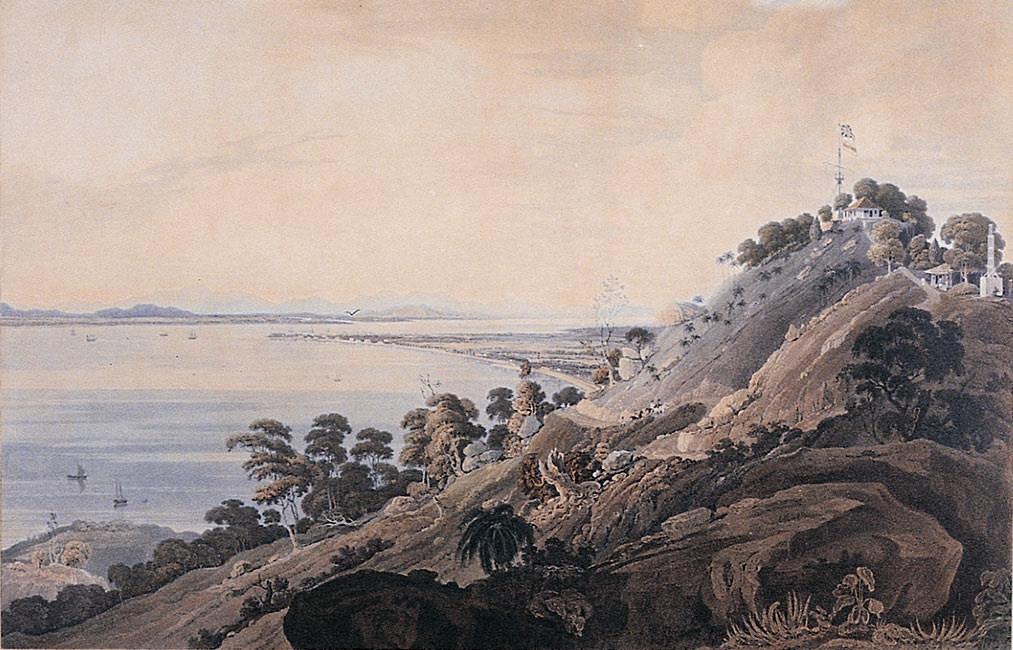
An 1818 painting depicting the coastline of what is now Tanjong Tokong. Mount Erskine (now Pearl Hill) is also visible to the right.

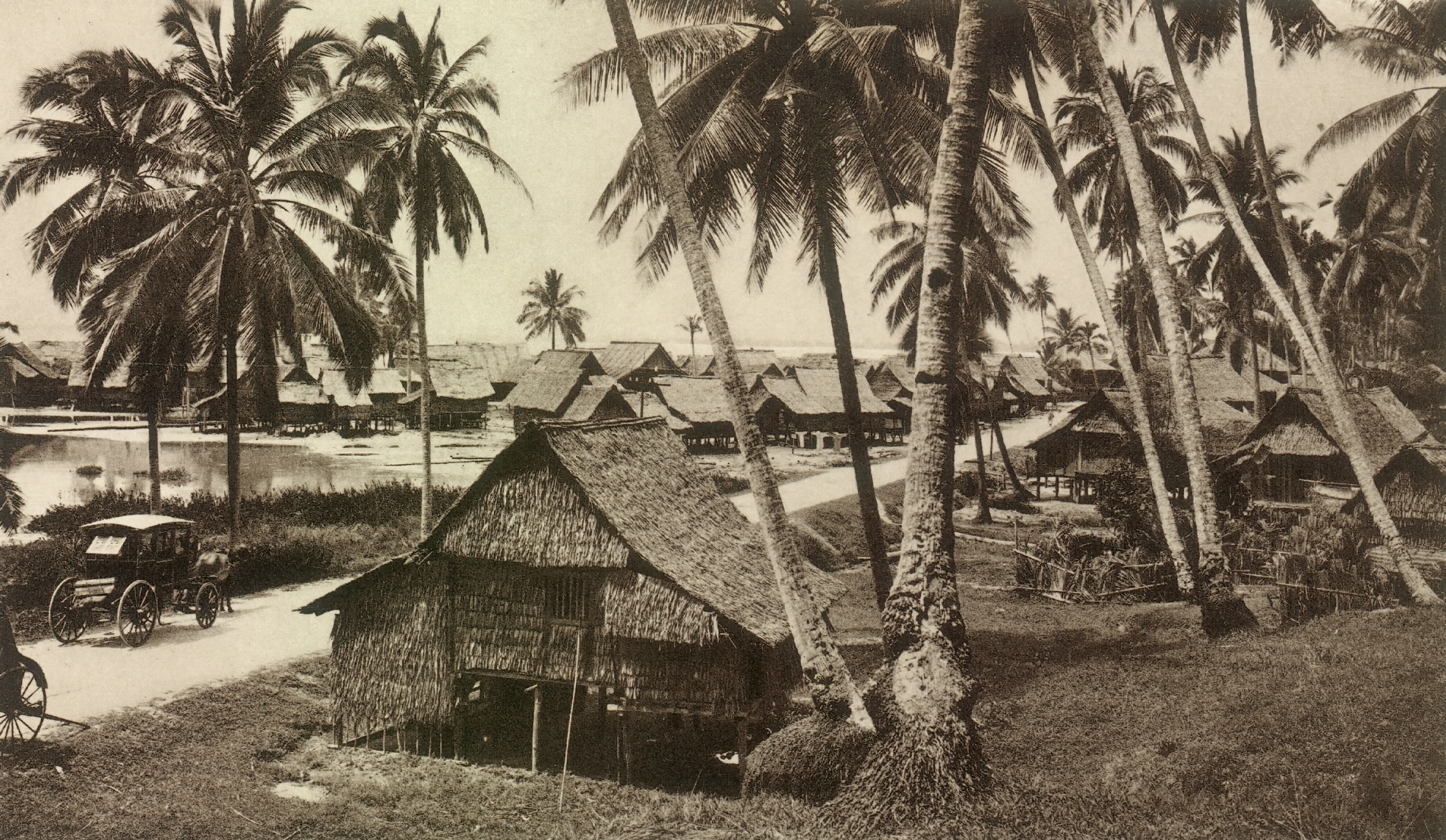
Tanjong Tokong in the 1910s

In the mid-18th century, a Chinese by the name of Zhang Li founded a fishing village at what is now Tanjong Tokong. He had actually intended to sail from China to Sumatra, but the rough seas pushed him to Penang Island instead. His arrival at Tanjong Tokong preceded Captain Francis Light's landing on Penang Island by about 40 years. To this day, Zhang Li, whose grave still lies at Tanjong Tokong, is worshipped by ethnic Chinese in Malaysia and Singapore as Tua Pek Kong, a local deity.

Tanjong Tokong remained a quiet fishing village until the 1970s, when the urbanisation of the area began. Low-rise apartments were followed by higher condominiums that were constructed along the shoreline. In addition, land reclamation is currently being carried out off the coastline as part of the Seri Tanjong Pinang project. These constructions have led to an increase in the standards of living, as Tanjong Tokong grew into an upscale suburb of George Town.

Tanjong Tokong was one of the hardest hit areas during the 2004 Indian Ocean tsunami that ultimately claimed a total of 52 lives in Penang.

== Geography ==
Map of Tanjong Tokong.
Click link at the top right corner to zoom in.
1 Island 88
2 City Junction
3 I-Santorini
4 The Landmark
5 Mount Miriam Cancer Hospital
6 Penang Chinese Swimming Club
7 UDA Flats

== Demographics ==
Ethnicities within Tanjong Tokong in 2020
Ethnicities / Nationality	Percentage
Chinese	54.6%
Malays	33.6%
Other Bumiputeras	0.3%
Indians	5.8%
Others	0.9%
Non-Malaysians	4.7%

As of 2020, Tanjong Tokong was home to a population of 12,550, resulting in a population density of 8,367/km^{2} (21,670/sq mi). Ethnic Chinese constituted almost 55% of the area's population, while Malays formed another 33% of the population. Indians comprised close to 6% of the suburb's population, followed by expatriates at nearly 5%.

== Transportation ==
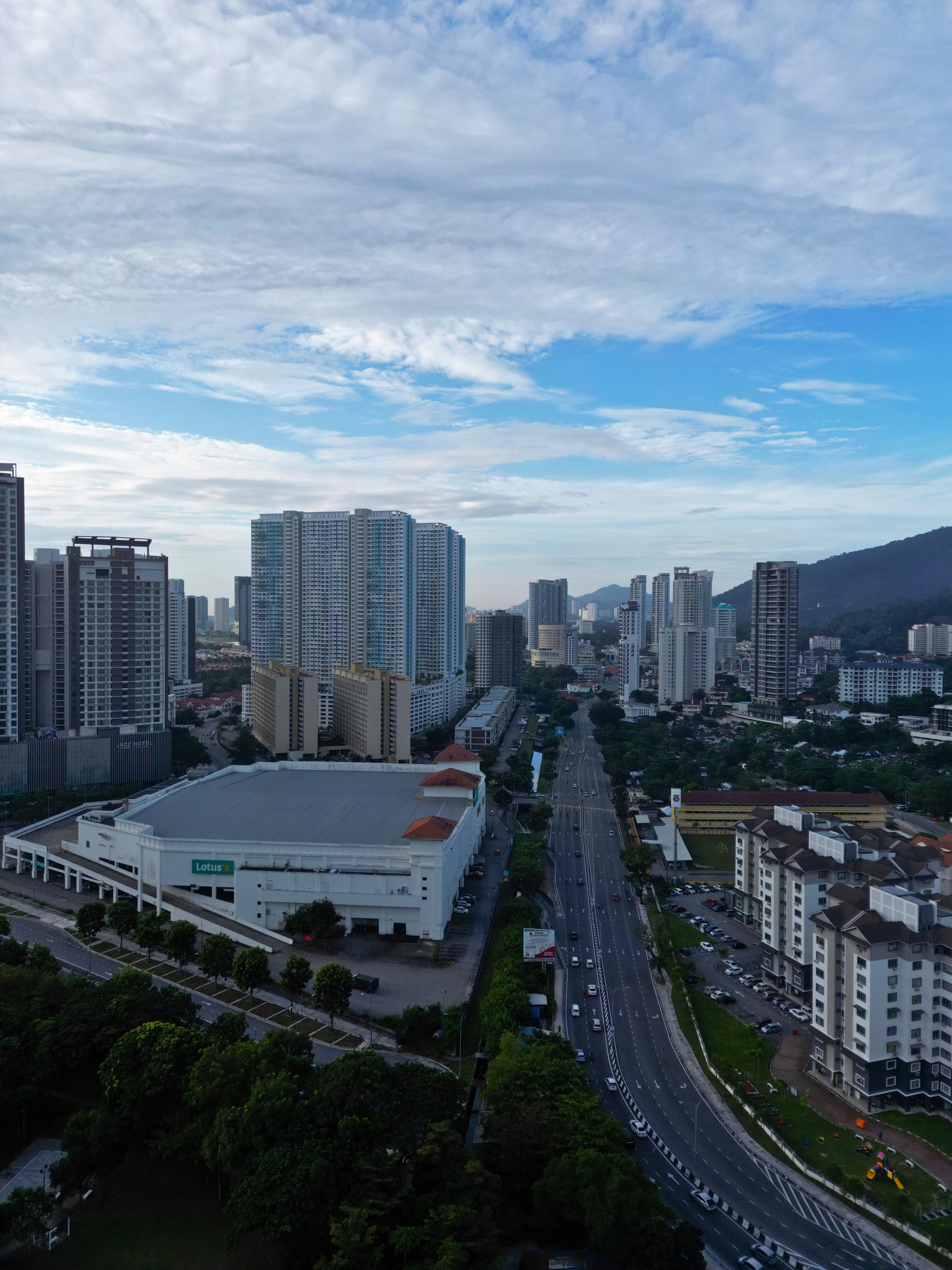
Jalan Tanjong Tokong is the main artery through the suburb

The main thoroughfare within Tanjong Tokong is Jalan Tanjong Tokong, which stretches from the neighbouring Pulau Tikus suburb and continues as Jalan Tanjong Bungah to the west. Part of the pan-island Federal Route 6, Jalan Tanjong Tokong, as with the handful of roads within the suburb, is prone to traffic congestion. An alternative route for the residents within the Tanjong Tokong and Tanjong Bungah suburbs is the Vale of Tempe Road, which connects with Mount Erskine Road.

Rapid Penang buses 101, 102 and 104 serve the residents of the suburb, by connecting Tanjong Tokong with various destinations within the city, such as Tanjong Bungah, Batu Ferringhi, the Penang International Airport and Queensbay Mall.

== Education ==
A total of two primary schools are located within Tanjong Tokong.

- SK Tanjong Tokong
- SJK (C) Hun Bin

== Retail ==
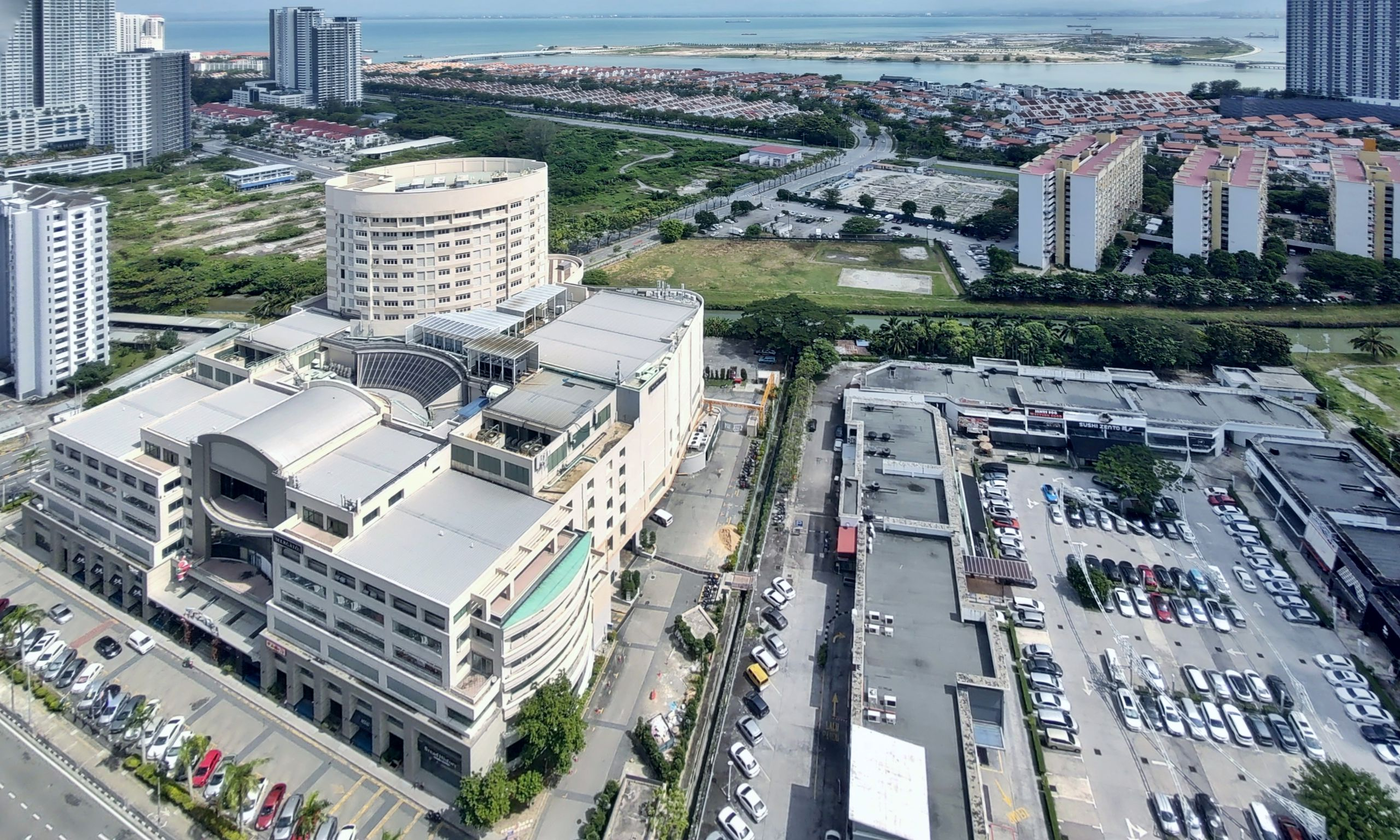
Island 88 (left) and Precinct 10 (right) viewed from City Residence condominium

Launched in 1995 at a cost of RM200 million, Island 88, formerly known as Island Plaza, was once considered the most luxurious retail complex in Penang. Due to the emergence of other retail centres throughout the city and lengthy renovations, the mall faced a period of decline, before being acquired by Hong Kong–based property magnate Paul Law. In the 2020s, City Junction was launched opposite Island 88 as part of the integrated City Residence mixed-use complex.

== Sports ==
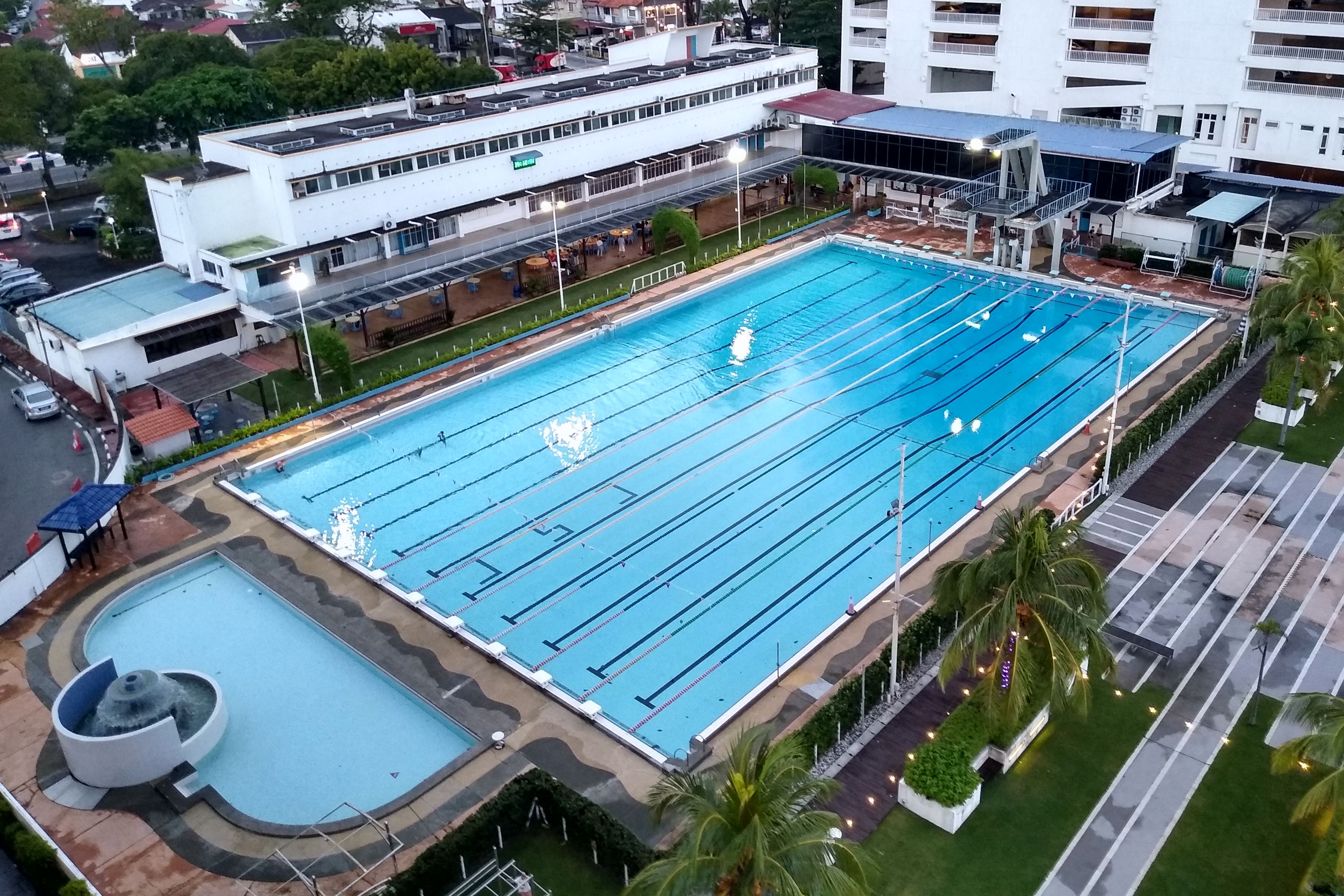
Penang Chinese Swimming Club

The Penang Chinese Swimming Club at the western end of Tanjong Tokong was founded in 1928 to promote swimming among Penang's Chinese community, at a time when Asians were barred from existing swimming associations. Aside from swimming activities, the club house now hosts other watersports activities as well, such as water polo and scuba diving.

== Neighbourhoods ==
- Mount Erskine
