= Victoria North, Manchester =

Proposed new town in England

Coordinates: 53°29′45″N 2°13′27″W

Victoria North
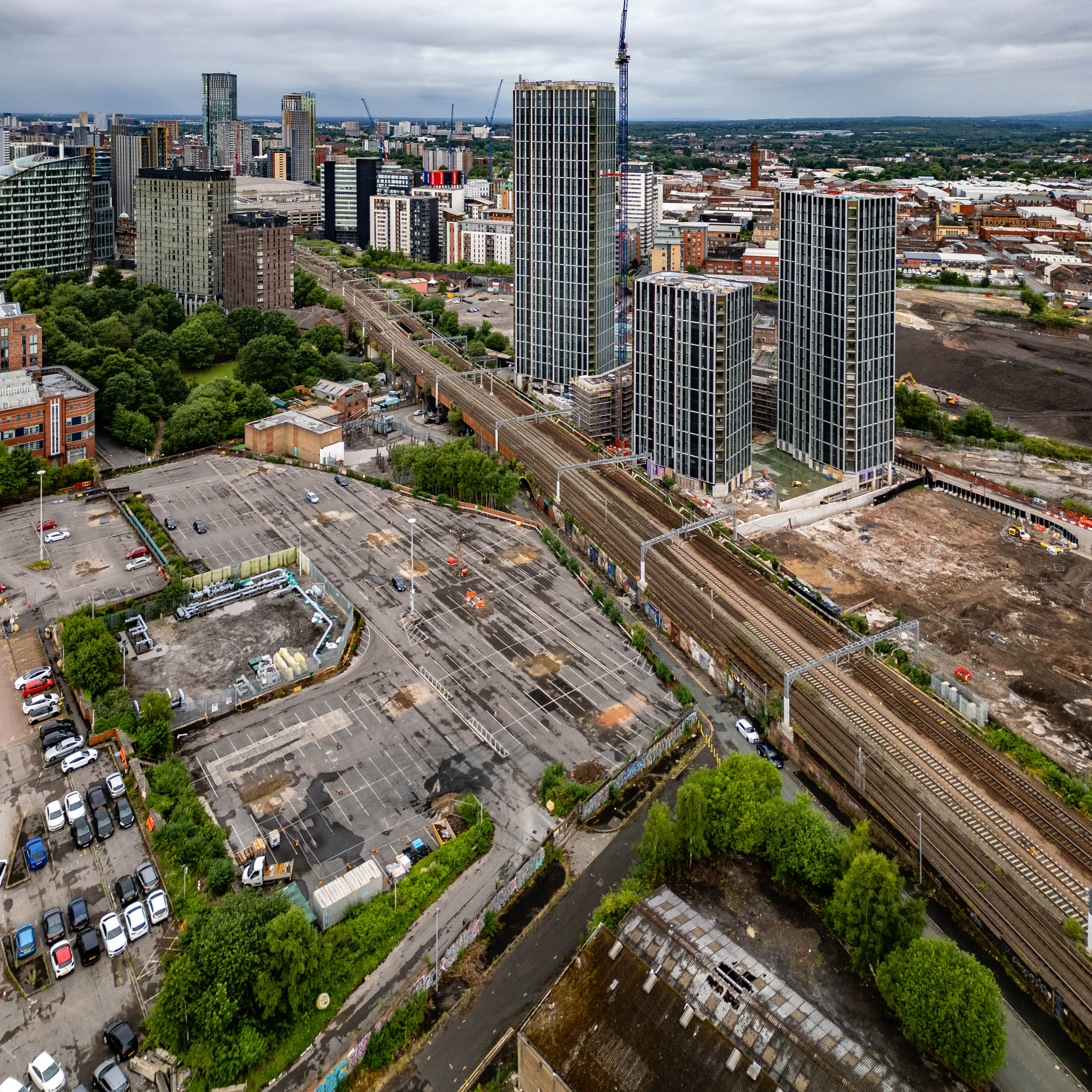
- Current progress (right of railway) alongside land earmarked for future residential development (bottom left)

- Location within Greater Manchester
- Interactive map of Victoria North
- Metropolitan borough: Manchester
- Metropolitan county: Greater Manchester
- Region: North West
- Country: England
- Sovereign state: United Kingdom
- Post town: MANCHESTER
- Postcode district: M40
- Dialling code: 0161
- Police: Greater Manchester
- Fire: Greater Manchester
- Ambulance: North West

Victoria North is a proposed new town and inner-city development area in Manchester, England. The development is located north of Manchester Victoria station and covers 380 acres (150 ha) of brownfield land, divided into seven neighbourhoods.

== History ==
The initial proposal was withdrawn in 2012 due to a lack of funding. The development was previously known as Manchester's Northern Gateway. The project is projected to cost upwards of £4 billion.

In September 2025, it was named as one of 12 locations by the government's New Towns Taskforce. Manchester City Council has described the project as one of the UK's largest and most ambitious regeneration schemes, and the biggest in the history of Manchester. The development will include 15,000 new homes. The site, which will comprise seven neighbourhoods, is located between Manchester city centre and Collyhurst.

In March 2026, the Ministry of Housing, Communities and Local Government announced that Victoria North was one of seven shortlisted areas for potential development. (Note: The other areas were Brabazon and West Innovation Arc, Gloucestershire; Crews Hill and Chase Park, Enfield; Leeds South Bank, West Yorkshire; Tempsford, Bedfordshire; Thamesmead, southeast London; and a site in Milton Keynes.) Further consultation is expected to take place, with final decisions due later in the year.

== Developments ==
=== Under construction ===
Project	Developer	Units	Year	Neighbourhood
Victoria Riverside	Far East Consortium (FEC)	634	2025	Red Bank
Downtown Victoria North	McGoff	237	U/C	New Town
Collyhurst Village	FEC/Manchester City Council	274	2025	Collyhurst

=== In development ===
Manchester-based developer Renaker submitted a proposal for 977 homes in the New Cross neighbourhood, located south of Victoria North. The scheme includes a 31-storey tower and several smaller buildings.

MCR Property Group proposed a 1,200-home development on a 6.6-acre (2.7 ha) site previously occupied by the Rochdale Road Gasworks. The scheme was approved by Manchester City Council in 2021.

FEC has outlined its next steps, including the 322-home Kingfisher building and the 189-home Falcon, both situated adjacent to the company's completed Victoria Riverside development.

== Transport and infrastructure ==
Victoria North will be connected by a new Metrolink tram stop at Sandhills.

Alongside housing, new schools and medical facilities are being developed through a joint venture between Manchester City Council and FEC.

== Parks ==
The masterplan also includes 99 acres (40 ha) of parkland, particularly concentrated around Irk Valley and Sandhills Park.

In July 2026, St Catherine's Wood was delivered as one of the first completed elements of the regeneration programme. Developed on land beside the River Irk, the 2.7-acre (1.1 ha) park was created using part of a £51.6 million Housing Infrastructure Fund grant from Homes England and additional brownfield funding from the Greater Manchester Combined Authority. It became the first new park established in Manchester since Mayfield Park in 2022.
