= City Residence =

Mixed-use complex in George Town, Penang, Malaysia

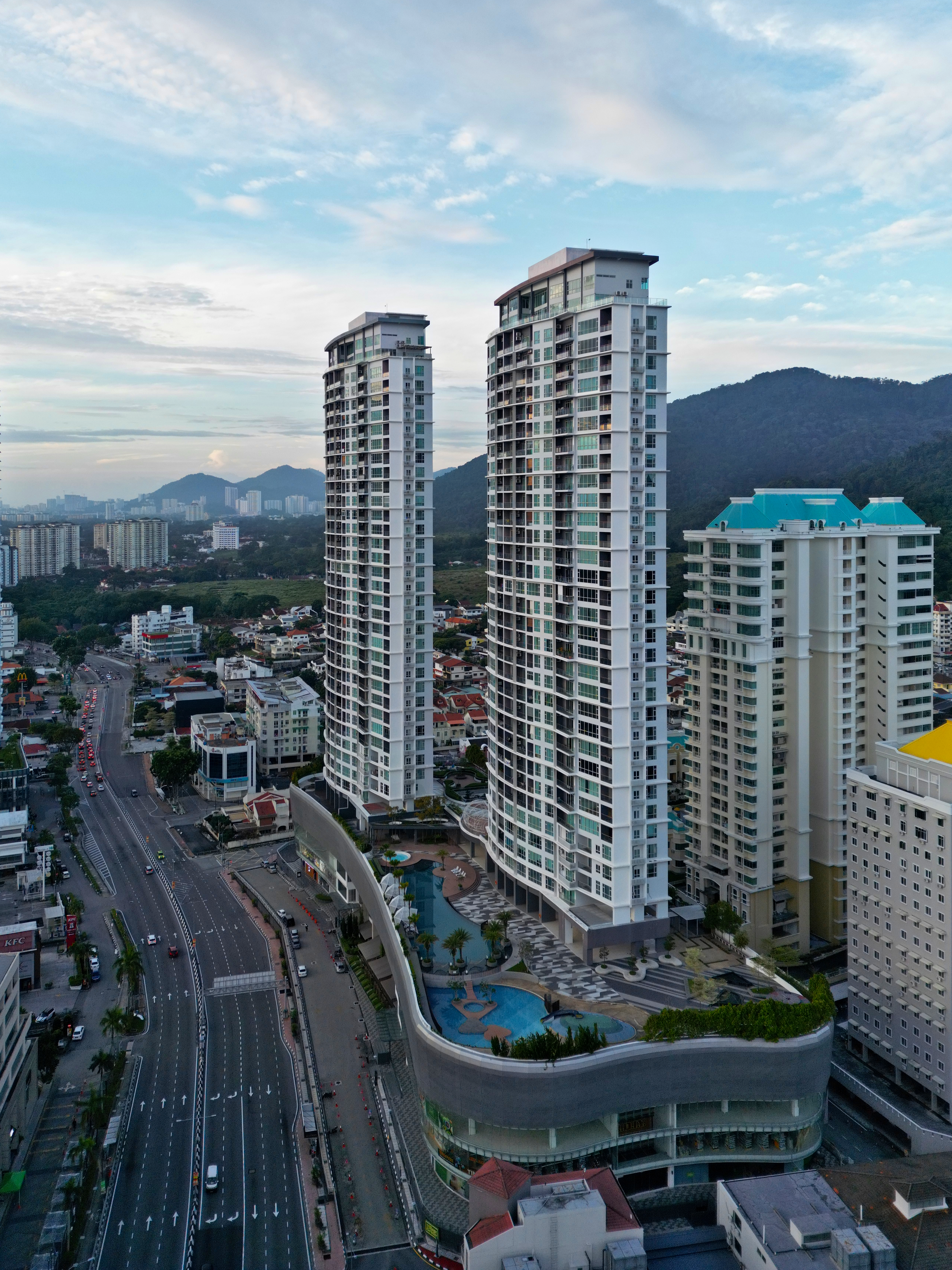
- Interactive map of the City Residence area

General information
- Type: Mixed-use complex
- Location: Persiaran Lengkuas 2, 10470 Tanjong Tokong, George Town, Penang, Malaysia
- Coordinates: 5.449744°N 100.30495°E
- Completed: 2017
- Owner: Ivory Properties Group

Height
- Top floor: 39

Technical details
- Floor count: 39
- Grounds: 2.42 acres (0.98 ha)
- Shopping mall details
- City Junction
- Developer: Ivory Properties Group
- Floor area: 217,000 sq ft (20,200 m^{2})
- Floors: 3
- Website: www.cityjunctionpg.com

City Residence is a mixed-use complex within George Town in the Malaysian state of Penang. Located at the suburb of Tanjong Tokong, the development consists of twin residential towers and a three-storey shopping mall named City Junction that forms the podium. Built by local developer Ivory Properties Group, each tower is designed as a low-density residence comprising only 101 units spread across 39 storeys, integrated with recreational and communal amenities.

== Facilities ==
The complex includes twin residential towers named City Residence and a three-storey commercial podium known as City Junction, covering 2.42 acres (0.98 ha) of freehold land at Tanjong Tokong. As of 2016, it was estimated that the complex would generate about RM313 million in gross development value.

The twin towers have a total of 202 residential units, ranging from 460 sq ft (43 m^{2}) sf for the smallest unit to the largest penthouse unit measuring 5,600 sq ft (520 m^{2}). Various recreational and communal amenities are available at the top of the podium, such as a swimming pool, barbecue pit, gymnasium, sauna and playground.

== Retail outlets ==
The three-storey commercial segment, City Junction, consists of 23 units ranging from 3,750 sq ft (348 m^{2}) to 14,200 sq ft (1,320 m^{2}). The interior features a tropical-style interior design that combines plants and water features, while allowing natural light and ventilation.

In 2022, Village Grocer, a Malaysian premium grocery chain, opened its first Penang store at City Junction, becoming the mall's anchor tenant. Since then, the 217,000 sq ft (20,200 m^{2}) retail centre has attracted a range of lifestyle, and food and beverage (F&B) tenants, including CU Mart, Guardian, MR.DIY and Taco Bell.

== Location ==
City Residence is situated opposite the Island 88 shopping mall, just off Jalan Tanjong Tokong, the main thoroughfare running through Tanjong Tokong. A RM2 million pedestrian bridge that connects both malls was completed in 2023.

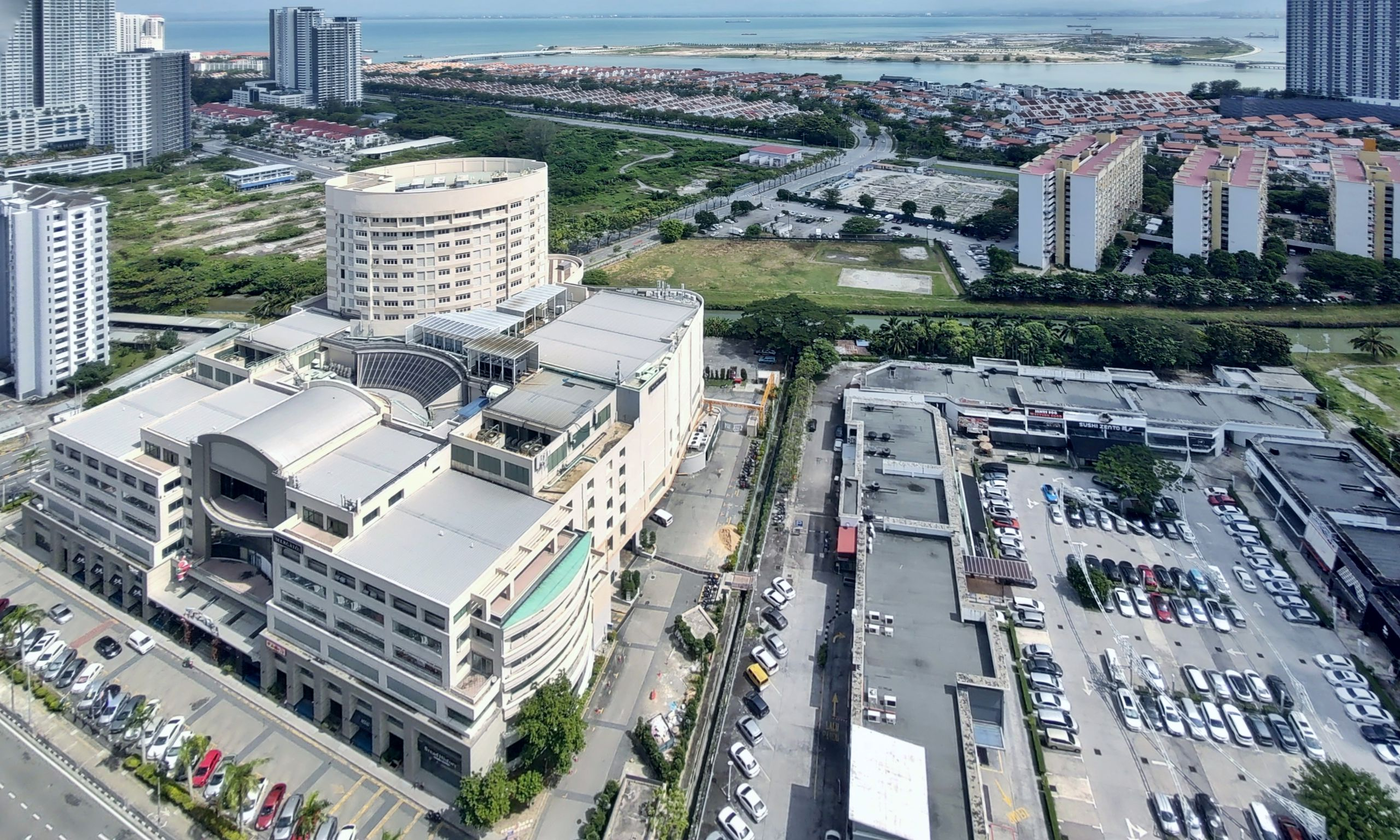
Island 88 (left) and Precinct 10 (right) shopping malls viewed from City Residence

== See also ==
- List of shopping malls in Malaysia
- List of tallest buildings in George Town, Penang
