= Island 88 =

Shopping mall in George Town, Penang, Malaysia

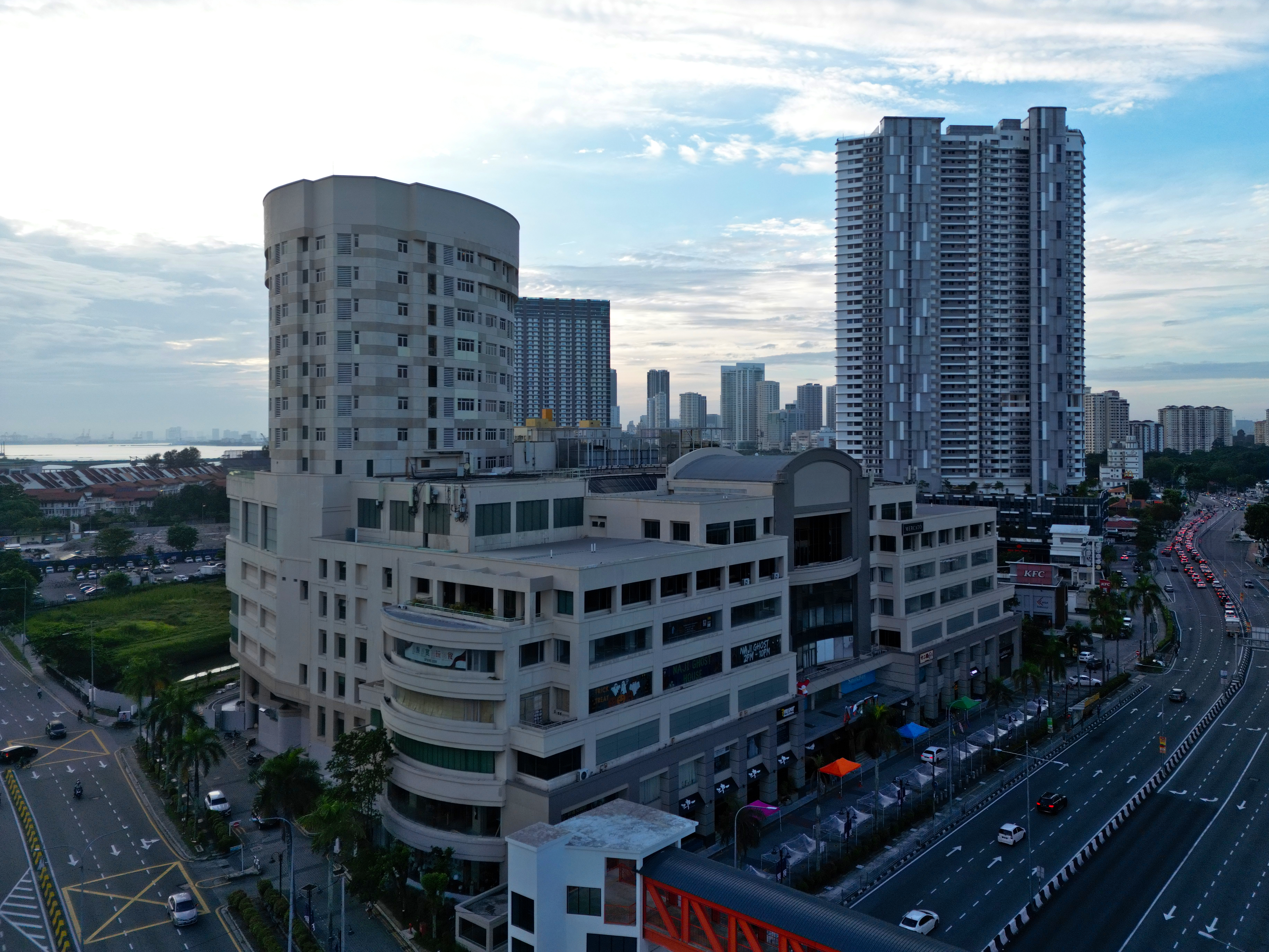
- Location: Tanjong Tokong, George Town, Penang
- Coordinates: 5.45046°N 100.30588°E
- Address: 118, Jalan Tanjong Tokong, 10470 Tanjong Tokong, George Town, Penang, Malaysia
- Opened: 1995
- Floors: 4
- Website: island88.com

Island 88, formerly known as Island Plaza, is a shopping mall within George Town in the Malaysian state of Penang. Located at the suburb of Tanjong Tokong, the 500,000 sq ft (46,000 m^{2}) retail complex was opened in 1995. After facing a decline due to the emergence of newer shopping malls throughout George Town, it was rebranded as Island 88 in 2023 by Hong Kong real estate tycoon Paul Law.

== History ==
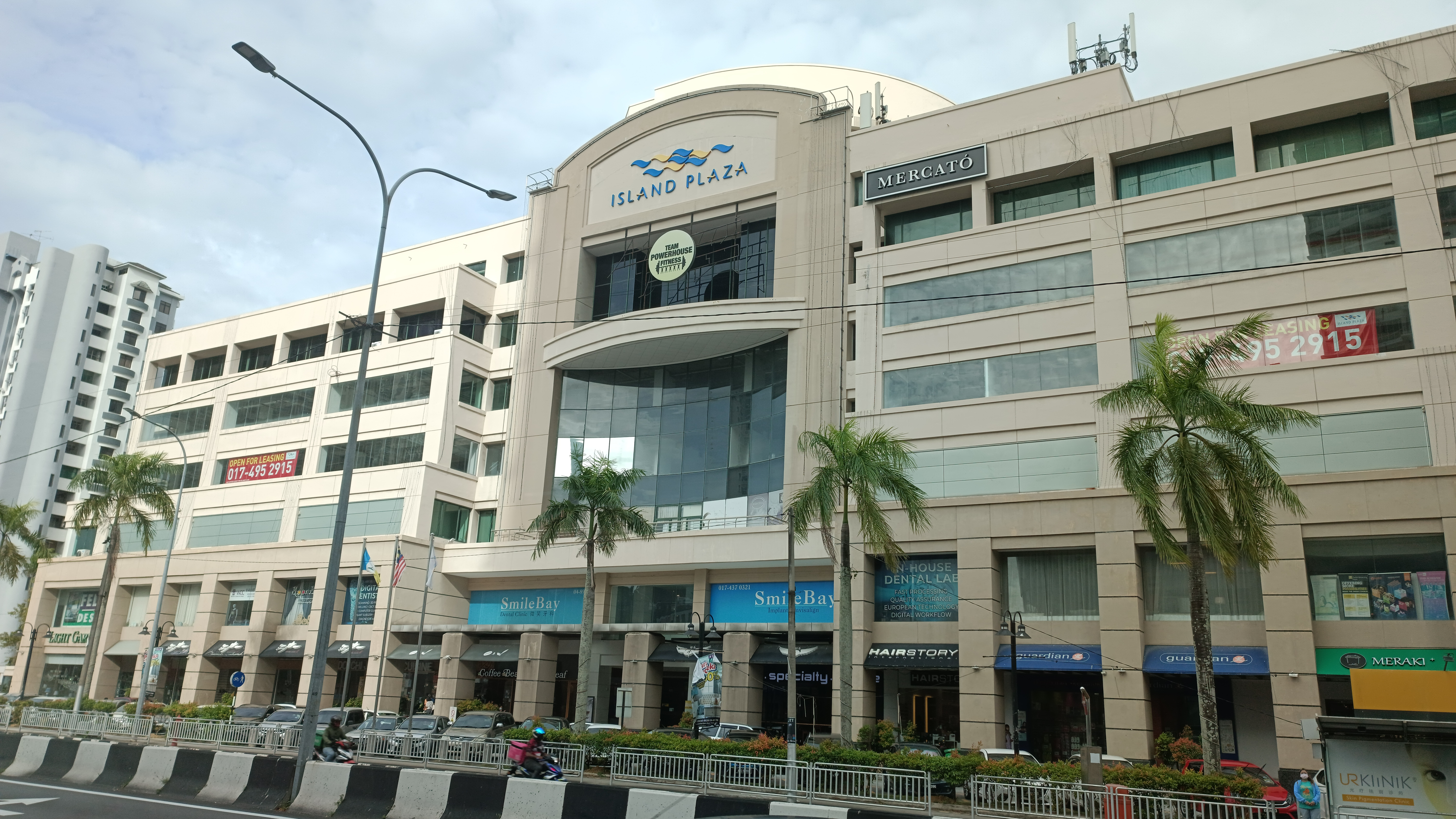
Island 88 in 2022

Island Plaza was launched in 1995 at a cost of RM200 million. Touted as the most luxurious retail complex in Penang at that time, it was at the forefront of introducing high-end brands like Versace, Fila, Oshkosh B'gosh and Mizuno into Penang. In 2005, Metrojaya became Island Plaza's anchor tenant by opening its first department store in Penang within the mall.

The Asian Retail Mall Fund II (ARMF II), a real estate fund managed by Primerica, purchased Island Plaza in 2007 and spent RM40 million on its renovation. However, due to the emergence of numerous shopping malls throughout George Town and the lengthy renovation, Island Plaza began to decline gradually. Metrojaya's department store was closed in 2011, and ARMF II started looking for investors to sell Island Plaza.

In 2020, just before the Movement Control Order caused by the COVID-19 pandemic, Paul Law, a Hong Kong property magnate, acquired Island Plaza for an undisclosed sum. The mall underwent rebranding in 2023 and was renamed Island 88. The revitalisation of Island 88 will involve the integration of Hong Kong-inspired dining establishments and lifestyle outlets.

== Location ==
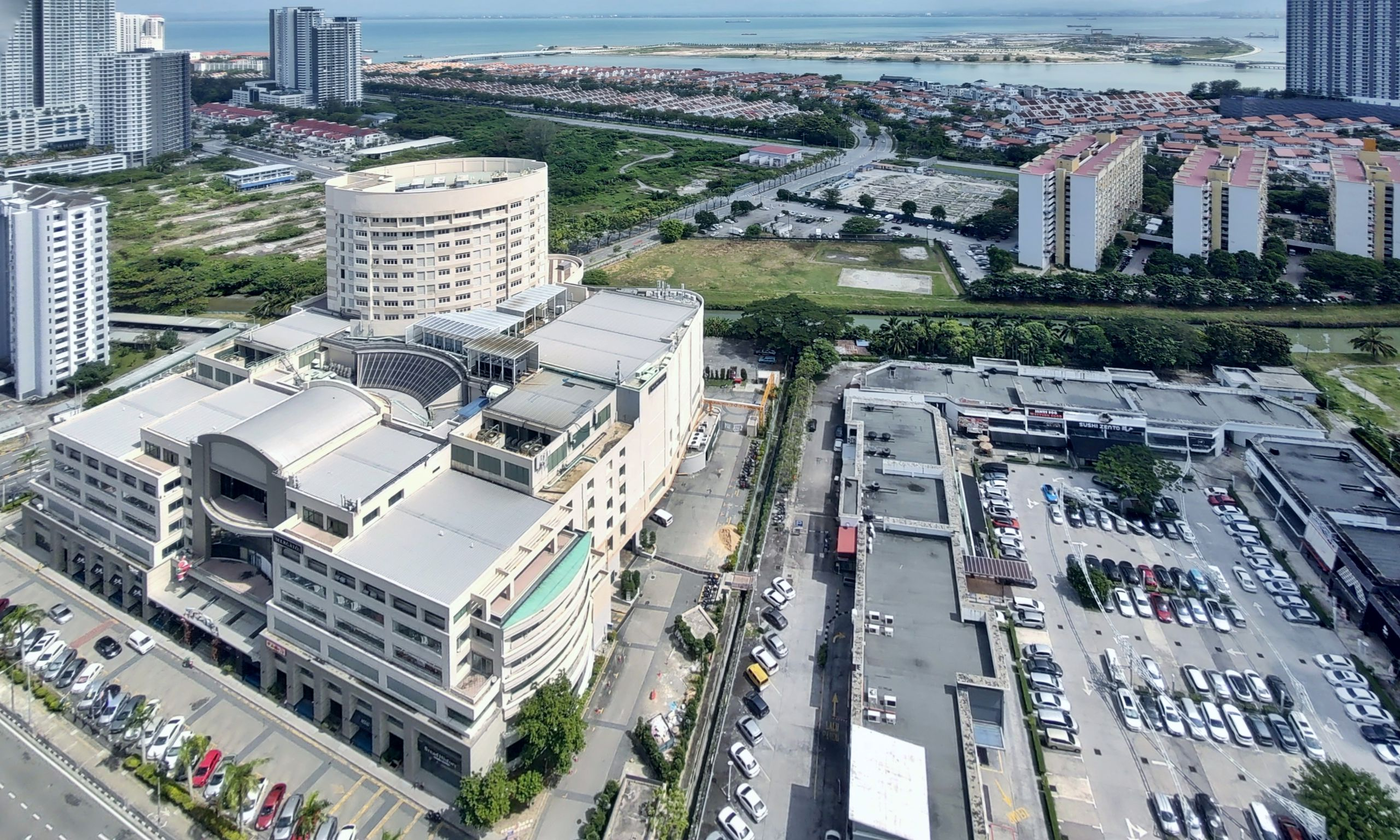
Island 88 (left) and Precinct 10 (right) viewed from City Residence condominium

Island 88 is situated opposite City Residence, at Jalan Tanjong Tokong, the main thoroughfare running through Tanjong Tokong.

== See also ==
- List of shopping malls in Malaysia
