= Dorsett Hospitality International =

Hong Kong-based hotel organization

Dorsett Hospitality International 帝盛酒店集團
- Type: Private
- Traded as: SEHK: 2266
- Industry: Hotels
- Founded: 23 January 2007; 19 years ago
- Headquarters: 18/F, Far East Consortium Building, 121 Des Voeux Road, Central, Hong Kong
- Key people: Winnie Chiu JP, President and Executive Director
- Website: www.dorsett.com

Dorsett Hospitality International, formerly known as Kosmopolito Hotels International (formerly traded as SEHK: 2266), is an international hotel and hospitality organization. Established in 2007, the company is a subsidiary of Far East Consortium International Limited. The company develops, owns and manages hotels across several countries with a specific focus in the Asia-Pacific region. Previously listed on the Hong Kong Stock Exchange in October 2010, Dorsett Hospitality International was privatised by its parent company Far East Consortium Limited in 2015.

== Senior leadership ==
- Chairman: David Chiu Tat-cheong (since January 2007)
- President: Winnie Chiu Wing-kwan (since November 2011)

=== Former presidents ===
- Bill Mok Kwai-pui (2007–2011)

== Hotels ==
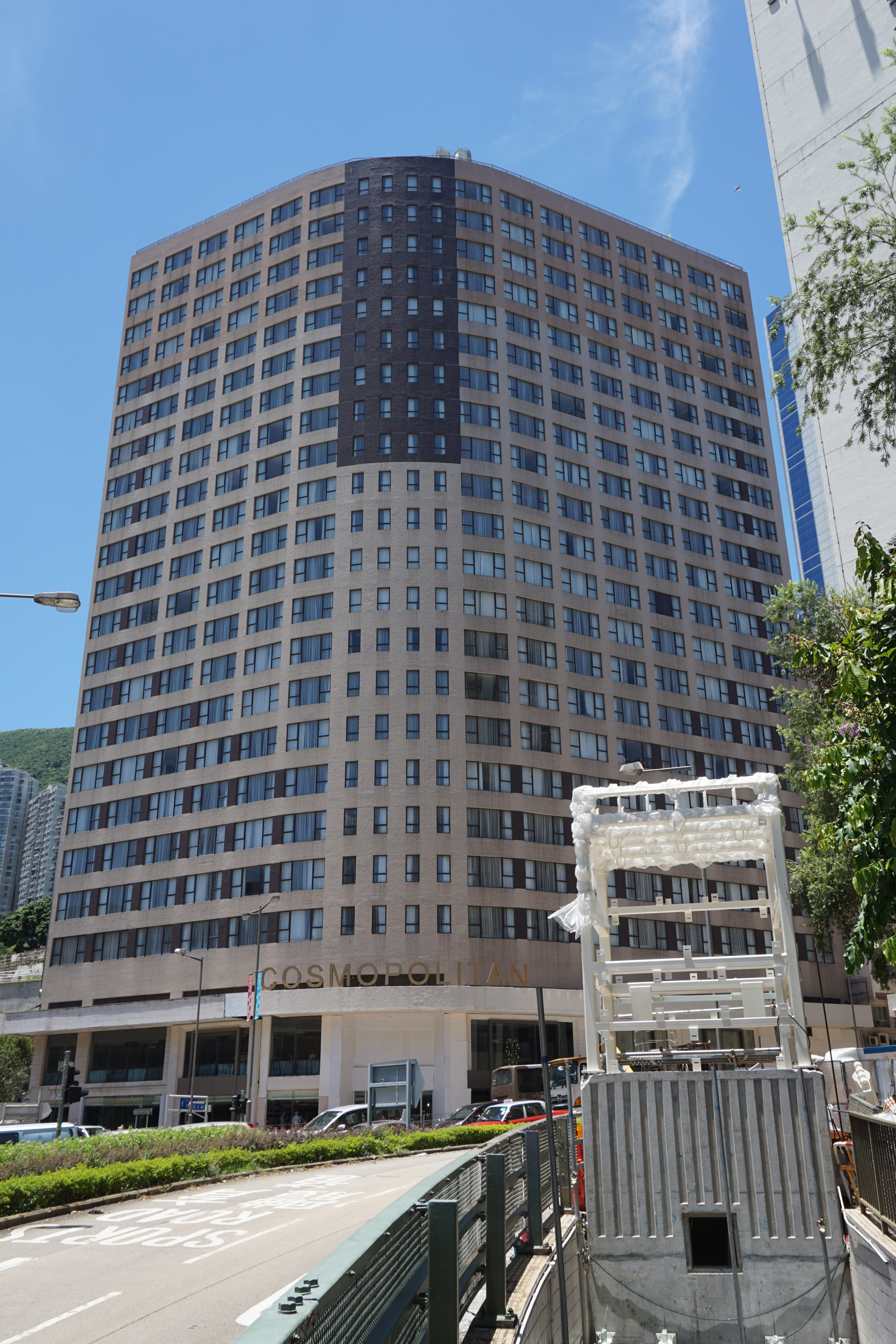
Dorsett Wanchai Hong Kong as seen in 2016.

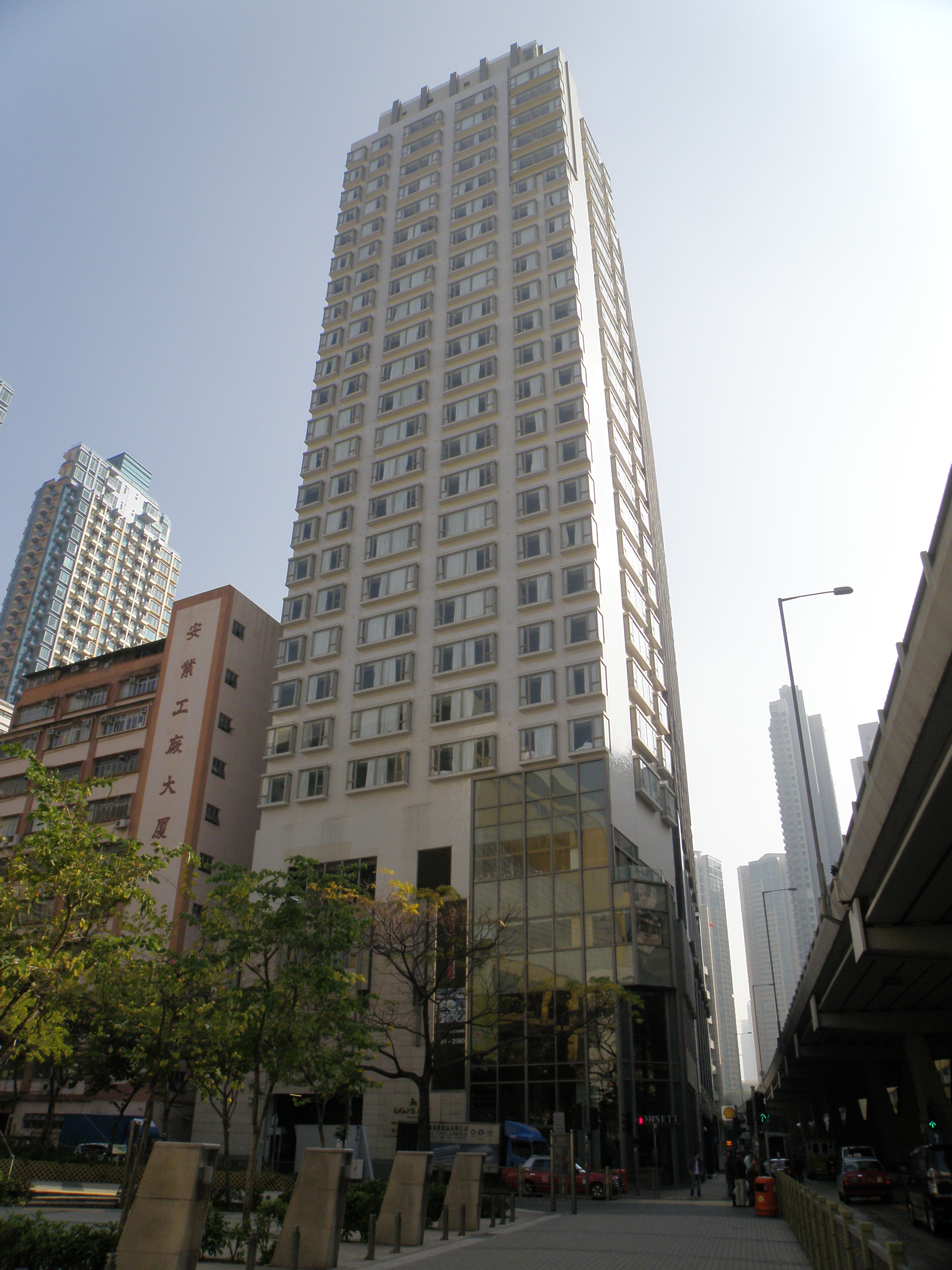
Dorsett Mongkok, Hong Kong as seen in 2015.

Hotels can be found throughout Mainland China (Shanghai, Chengdu, Jiujiang and Wuhan), Hong Kong, Malaysia (Kuala Lumpur, Johor Bahru, Labuan and Subang), Singapore, the United Kingdom (London) and Australia (Gold Coast and Melbourne).

List of hotels as of July 2023:

=== Mainland China ===
- Dorsett Chengdu
- Dorsett Shanghai
- Dorsett Wuhan
- Lushan Resort

=== Hong Kong ===
- Dorsett Kai Tak, Hong Kong (under development)
- Dorsett Kwun Tong, Hong Kong
- Dorsett Mongkok, Hong Kong
- Dorsett Tsuen Wan, Hong Kong
- Dorsett Wanchai Hong Kong Hotel
- Cosmo Hotel Hong Kong
- Lan Kwai Fong Hotel@Kau U Fong
- Silka Far East, Hong Kong
- Silka Seaview, Hong Kong
- Silka Tsuen Wan, Hong Kong

=== Singapore ===
- Dao by Dorsett AMTD Singapore
- Dorsett Singapore

=== United Kingdom ===
- Dao by Dorsett West London
- Dao by Dorsett AMTD Hornsey Town Hall (under development)
- Dorsett Canary Wharf, London
- Dorsett Shepherds Bush, London

=== Malaysia ===
- Dorsett Grand Labuan
- Dorsett Grand Subang
- Dorsett Kuala Lumpur
- Dorsett Putrajaya
- Dorsett Hartamas, Kuala Lumpur
- Dorsett Residences Bukit Bintang
- J-Hotel by Dorsett
- Silka Johor Bahru
- Silka Maytower, Kuala Lumpur
- Silka Cheras

=== Australia ===
- Dorsett Brisbane (under development)
- Dorsett Gold Coast
- Dorsett Melbourne
- Dorsett Perth (under development)
