= Far East Consortium =

Hong Kong property development company

Far East Consortium International Limited 遠東發展有限公司
- Company type: public
- Traded as: SEHK: 35
- Industry: Property development, hotel and car park
- Founded: 1950; 76 years ago
- Headquarters: 16/F, Far East Consortium Building, 121 Des Voeux Road, Central, Hong Kong
- Key people: David Chiu (Chairman, Board of Directors)
- Website: fecil.com.hk

Far East Consortium
- Traditional Chinese: 遠東發展有限公司
- Simplified Chinese: 远东发展有限公司
Transcriptions
Standard Mandarin
- Hanyu Pinyin: Yuǎndōng Fāzhǎn Yǒuxiàngōngsī
Yue: Cantonese
- Yale Romanization: Yúhn dūng faat jín yáuh haahn gūng sī
- Jyutping: Jyun5 dung1 faat3 zin2 jau5 haan6 gung1 si1

Far East Consortium International Limited (FEC) (SEHK: 35) is a company with its head office in Central, Hong Kong. It was founded in 1950 by Deacon Chiu and listed on the Hong Kong Stock Exchange in 1972.

FEC is mainly engaged in property development and investment, hotel development and management, car park operations and facilities management, securities and financial product investment and gaming and related operations and provision of mortgage services.

The Group adopts geographical diversification and "Asian wallet" strategy, with business covering Hong Kong, Mainland China, Australia, Malaysia, Singapore, the United Kingdom, New Zealand and other European countries.

== Senior leadership ==
FEC has been led by Deacon Chiu since the company's founding 1950, until 2011 when Deacon retired and was replaced by his son David Chiu.

=== List of chairmen ===
1. Deacon Chiu (1950–2011)
2. David Chiu (2011– )

=== List of CEOs ===
The position of CEO was formed in 1997.

1. David Chiu (1997– )

== Property ==
FEC has a residential and mixed-use project portfolio across different markets in Australia, Mainland China, Hong Kong, Malaysia, Singapore and the United Kingdom.

== Hotel ==
The company operates more than 20 hotels with approximately 6,000 rooms, located in Hong Kong, mainland China, the United Kingdom, Austria, Germany, Czechia, Singapore, and Malaysia.

FEC holds a strategic investment in Dorsett Hospitality International, formerly known as Kosmopolito Hotels International (HKEx Stock Code: 2266), an international hotel and hospitality organization established in 2007. Listed on the Hong Kong Stock Exchange in October 2010, the company develops, owns and manages hotels across several countries with a specific focus in the Asia region. Hotels can be found throughout Hong Kong, Malaysia (Kuala Lumpur, Johor Bahru, Labuan and Subang), China (Shanghai, Chengdu, Jiujiang and Wuhan), Singapore, Austria (Linz), Germany (Hann. Münden, Seligenstadt, Much), Czechia (Hatě) and the United Kingdom (London).

== Car park ==
FEC is among the top three car parking chain brands in Australia. The market share (2015) was approximately 20%. As at 30 September 2015, the Group's car park portfolio comprised 351 car parks with approximately 70,700 car parking bays.

This division expanded its operation to include facilities management in Australia (mainly in Brisbane, Melbourne and Adelaide) and Johor Bahru, Malaysia.

== Gaming ==
At the end of 2014, FEC signed a consortium bid agreement with Chow Tai Fook Enterprises Limited and Star Entertainment Group Limited to bid for the development of an entertainment precinct and integrated resort in Brisbane with approximately 9.4 hectares of site area. In July 2015, Destination Brisbane Consortium was selected by the Queensland State as the preferred proponent to undertake the Project. The Project entails the development of an entertainment precinct and integrated resort as well as residential development at Queen's Wharf Brisbane, Queensland, Australia.

Far East operates three casinos in the Czech Republic under its wholly owned subsidiary Trans World Corporation along the borders with Germany and Austria. The three casinos were later rebranded as "PALASINO". In 2022, FEC has been granted an online gaming license in Malta as it looks to expand its gaming interests in Europe.

== Mortgage services ==
FEC established a mortgage lending platform under BC Invest that provides residential mortgages to non-resident international property buyers, as an extension of its property development business.

BC Invest also provides investments service, it launched one of Australia's first green mortgage funds in 2022 and issued seven residential mortgage-backed securities (RMBS) programs in the Australian bond market since 2020.

== See also ==
- Consort Place
