= St. Peter's Church =

Aside from St. Peter's Basilica in Vatican City, St. Peter's Church may refer to:

== Australia ==
- St Peter's Church, Darlinghurst, Sydney, New South Wales
- St Peters Church, St Peters, Sydney, New South Wales
- St Peter's Anglican Church, Barcaldine, Queensland
- St Peter's Cathedral, Adelaide, South Australia
- St Peter's Lutheran Church, Hobart, Tasmania
- St Peter's Church, Eastern Hill, Melbourne, Victoria

== Austria ==
- Peterskirche, Vienna

== Belgium ==
- St. Peter's Church, Gijverinkhove
- St. Peter's Church, Leuven
- St Peter's Church, Liège
- St. Peter's Church, Melreux

== Bermuda ==
- St. Peter's Church, St. George's

== Bulgaria ==
- Church of St Peter, Berende

== Canada ==
- St. Peter's Lutheran Church, Ottawa, Ontario
- Cathedral of St. Peter-in-Chains, Peterborough, Ontario
- St. Peter's Church, Toronto, Ontario

== China ==
- Saint Peter's Church, Shanghai

== Czech Republic ==
- Church of St. Peter at Poříčí (Prague)

== Denmark ==
- St. Peter's Church, Bornholm
- St. Peter's Church, Copenhagen
- St. Peter's Church, Næstved, Zealand
- Saint Peter's Church, Slagelse

== Ecuador ==
- Riobamba Cathedral (Cathedral of Saint Peter), Riobamba

== Estonia ==
- St Peter's Church, Tartu

== France ==
- Church of St. Peter, Chennevières-sur-Marne
- St Peter's Church, Le Crotoy, Picardy
- St Peter's Church, Liverdun, Lorraine
- Old Saint Peter's Church, Strasbourg
- Saint-Pierre-le-Jeune Catholic Church, Strasbourg
- Saint-Pierre-le-Jeune Protestant Church, Strasbourg

== Finland ==
- St. Peter's Church, Siuntio

== Germany ==
- St. Peter am Perlach, Augsburg
- St. Peter's Church, Cologne
- Cologne Cathedral
- St. Peter's Church, Dortmund
- St. Peter, Syburg, Dortmund-Syburg
- Church of St Peter, Frankfurt
- Saint Peter's Church, Fritzlar
- Church of Saint Peter, Hamburg
- St. Peter's Church, Heidelberg
- St. Peter, Leipzig
- St Peter's Church, Lübeck
- St. Peter's Church, Mainz
- St. Peter's Church, Munich
- St. Peter's Church, Rostock
- St. Peter's Church, Straubing
- St Peter's Dom, Worms

== Iceland ==
- St. Peter's Church, Akureyri

== India ==
- St. Peter's Church, Royapuram, Chennai, Tamil Nadu

== Iran ==
- Saint Peter Church, Tehran

== Ireland ==
- St Peter's Church, Ballymodan, County Cork
- Church of St Peter, Carrigrohane, Cork, County Cork
- St. Peter's Church, Aungier Street, Dublin
- St Peter's Church, Phibsborough, Dublin
- St. Peter's Church, Ennisnag, Kilkenny
- St. Peter's Church, Laragh, County Monaghan
- St. Peter's Roman Catholic Church, Drogheda, County Louth
- St. Peter's Church of Ireland, Drogheda, County Louth

== Israel ==
- St. Peter's Church, Capernaum
- St. Peter's Church, Jaffa
- St. Peter's Church, Tiberias

== Italy ==
- Church of St. Peter (Portovenere)
- Old St. Peter's Basilica, Rome
- San Pietro in Vincoli, Rome

== Kosovo ==
- St. Peter's Basilica Church, Stari Trg

== Latvia ==
- St. Peter's Church, Riga

== Liberia ==
- St. Peter's Lutheran Church in Monrovia scene of the Monrovia Church massacre

== Malaysia ==
- St. Peter's Church (Melaka)
- St. Peter's Church, Kuching

== Malta ==
- St Peter's Church and Monastery, Mdina
- St Peter's Chapel, Qormi

== Netherlands ==
- St. Peter's Church, Leiden
- Protestant church of Jistrum or St. Peter's Church
- St. Peter's Church, Utrecht

== New Zealand ==
- St Peter's Anglican Church, Onehunga, Auckland
- St Peter's Church, Riccarton, Christchurch

== Norway ==
- St. Peter's Church, Halden

== Pakistan ==
- St. Peter's Church, Karachi

== Peru ==
- St. Peter's Church, Lima

== Philippines ==
- Loboc Church (San Pedro Apostol Parish Church), Loboc, Bohol
- San Pedro Cathedral (Davao Metropolitan Cathedral), Davao City

== Serbia ==
- St. Peter's Church, Ras

== Slovenia ==
- St. Peter's Church, Ljubljana

== Spain ==
- Church of San Pedro Apóstol (Vitoria)
- Church of St Peter ad Vincula, Madrid
- San Pedro el Real, Madrid
- St. Peter's Church, Teruel
- St. Peter's Church, Valdunquillo, Valladolid

== Sri Lanka ==
- St. Peter's Church, Colombo

== Sweden ==
- St. Peter's Church, Malmö
- St. Peter's Church, Stockholm

== Switzerland ==
- St. Peter, Zürich

== Turkey ==
- Church of Saint Peter, Antioch

== United Kingdom ==
=== England ===
==== Bedfordshire ====
- Church of St Peter, Arlesey
- St Peter's Church, Bedford
- Church of St Peter, Harrold, Bedfordshire
- Church of St Peter, Milton Bryan
- Church of St Peter, Pavenham
- Church of St Peter, Pertenhall
- Church of St Peter, Sharnbrook
- Church of St Peter, Wrestlingworth

==== Berkshire ====
- St Peter's Church, Caversham

==== Bristol ====
- St Peter's Church, Bishopsworth
- St Peter's Church, Castle Park, Bristol

==== Buckinghamshire ====
- St Peter's Church, Burnham, Buckinghamshire
- St Peter's Church, Marlow

==== Cambridgeshire ====
- St Peter's Church, Babraham
- St Peter's Church, Cambridge
- St Peter's Church, Duxford
- St Peter's Church, Offord D'Arcy
- St Peter-in-Ely
- St Peter's Church, Prickwillow
- St Peter and St Paul's Church, Wisbech

==== Cheshire ====
- St Peter's Church, Aston-by-Sutton
- St Peter's Church, Chester
- St Peter's Church, Congleton
- St Peter's Church, Crewe
- St Peter's Church, Delamere
- St Peter's Church, Hargrave
- St Peter's Church, Little Budworth
- St Peter's Church, Macclesfield
- St Peter's Church, Minshull Vernon
- St Peter's Church, Oughtrington
- St Peter's Church, Plemstall
- St Peter's Church, Prestbury
- St Peter's Church, Swettenham
- St Peter's Church, Tabley
- St Peter's Church, Waverton

==== Cumbria ====
- St Peter's Church, Camerton
- St Peter's Church, Field Broughton
- St Peter's Church, Finsthwaite
- St Peter's Church, Heversham
- St Peter's Church, Kirkbampton
- St Peter's Church, Mansergh
- St Peter's Church, Martindale
- St Peter's Church, Sawrey

==== Derbyshire ====
- St Peter's Church, Belper
- St Peter's Church, Derby
- St Peter's Church, Edensor
- St Peter's Church, Hope
- St Peter's Church, Netherseal
- St Peter's Church, Parwich
- St Peter's Church, Snelston
- St Peter's Church, Stonebroom

==== Devon ====
- St Peter's Church, Barnstaple
- Church of St Peter, Fremington
- St Peter's Church, Lew Trenchard
- St Peter's Church, Noss Mayo
- St Peter's Church, Rose Ash, by architect James Piers St Aubyn
- St Peter's Church, Satterleigh
- Church of St Peter, Shaldon
- Church of St Peter, Shirwell
- St Peter's Church, Tiverton

==== Dorset ====
- St Peter's Church, Bournemouth
- St Peter's Church, Chetnole
- St Peter's Church, Dorchester
- St Peter's Church, Eype
- St Peter's Church, Langton Herring
- St Peter's Church, Parkstone
- St Peter's Church, Portesham
- St Peter's Church, Portland
- St Peter's Church, Winterborne Came

==== County Durham ====
- St Peter's Church, Bishopton
- St Peter's Church, Redcar
- St Peter's Church, Stockton-on-Tees

==== East Sussex ====
- St Peter's Church, Aldrington
- St Peter's Church, Brighton
- St Peter's Church, Firle
- St Peter's Church, Preston Village, Brighton
- St Peter's Church, St Leonards-on-Sea
- St Peter's Church, West Blatchington
- St Mary and St Peter's Church, Wilmington
- St Peter's Church, Rodmell

==== Essex ====
- Church of St Peter-on-the-Wall, Bradwell-on-Sea
- St Peter's Church, Littlebury Green
- St Peter's Church, Roydon
- St Peter's Church, Wickham Bishops

==== Gloucestershire ====
- Church of St Peter, Daylesford
- Church of St Peter, Farmington
- St Peter's Church, Gloucester
- St Peter's Church, Leckhampton
- Church of St Peter, Little Barrington
- Church of St Peter, Rendcomb
- St Peter's Church, Southrop
- Church of St Peter, Willersey
- Church of St Peter, Windrush

==== Greater Manchester ====
- St Peter's Church, Ashton-under-Lyne
- Church of St Peter, Blackley
- St Peter's Church, Bolton
- St Peter's Church, Hindley
- St Peter's Church, Stockport
- Church of St Peter, Swinton
- St Peter's Church, Westleigh

==== Hampshire ====
- Church of St Peter ad Vincula, Colemore
- St Peter's Church, Petersfield
- St Peter's Church, Titchfield
- St Peter's Church, Chesil, Winchester
- St Peter's Church, Winchester
- St Peter's Church, Yateley

==== Hertfordshire ====
- Church of St Peter, Great Berkhamsted
- Church of St Peter, St Albans

==== Isle of Wight ====
- St Peter's Church, Havenstreet
- St Peter's Church, Seaview
- St Peter's Church, Shorwell

==== Kent ====
- St Peter's, Kent
- St Peter's Church, Boughton Monchelsea
- St Peter's Church, Maidstone
- St Peter's Church, Sandwich
- St Peter's Church, Swingfield

==== Lancashire ====
- St Peter's Church, Burnley
- St Peter's Church, Darwen
- St Peter's Church, Fleetwood
- St Peter's Church, Heysham
- St Peter's Church, Leck
- St Peter's Church, Mawdesley
- St Peter's Church, Preston, Lancashire
- St Peter's Church, Quernmore
- St Peter's Church, Scorton
- St Peter's Church, Stonyhurst

==== Leicestershire ====
- St Peter's Church, Allexton
- St Peter's Church, Arnesby
- St Peter's Church, Ashby Parva
- St Peter's Church, Aston Flamville
- St Peter's Church, Bardon
- St Peter's Church, Belgrave
- St Peter's Church, Leicester

==== Lincolnshire ====
- St Peter's Church, Barton-upon-Humber
- Church of St Peter, Holton-le-Clay
- St Peter's Church, Kingerby
- St Peter's Church, Normanby by Spital
- St Peter's Church, Ropsley
- St Peter's Church, Saltfleetby
- St Peter's Church, South Somercotes
- St Peter's Church, Threekingham
- St Peter's Church, Trusthorpe

==== London ====
- St Peter's Church, Arkley
- St Peter's Church, Belsize Park, by architect James Piers St Aubyn
- St Peter's, Bethnal Green
- St Peter's Church, Croydon
- St Peter's Church, Ealing
- St Peter's Church, Eaton Square
- St Peter's Church, Great Windmill Street
- St Peter's Church, Hammersmith
- St Peter's, London Docks
- St Peter's Church, Petersham
- St Peter's Church, Regent Square
- St Peter's Church, Streatham
- St Peter's Church, Upton Cross
- St Peter's Church, Vauxhall
- St Peter's Church, Walworth
- Westminster Abbey, the Collegiate Church of Saint Peter at Westminster
- St Peter's Italian Church
- St Peter upon Cornhill
- St Peter-in-the-Forest

==== Merseyside ====
- St Peter's Church, Birkdale
- St Peter's Church, Formby
- St Peter's Church, Heswall
- St Peter's Church, Liverpool
- St Peter's Roman Catholic Church, Liverpool
- St Peter's Church, Woolton, Liverpool
- St Peter's Church, Parr
- St Peter's Church, Rock Ferry

==== Norfolk ====
- St Peter's Church, Forncett
- St Peter's Church, Hockwold
- Saint Peter’s Church, North Barningham
- St Peter's Church, Yaxham

==== North Yorkshire ====
- St Peter's Church, Birkby
- St Peter's Church, Brafferton
- St Peter's Church, Cleasby
- St Peter's Church, Coniston Cold
- Church of St Peter, Croft-on-Tees
- St Peter's Church, Dalby
- St Peter's Church, Harrogate
- Church of St Peter, Hilton
- St Peter's Church, Langdale End
- St Peter's Church, Redcar
- St Peter's Church, Rylstone
- St Peter's Church, Scarborough
- St Peter's Church, Stainforth
- St Peter's Church, Walpole St Peter
- St Peter's Church, Wintringham

==== Northamptonshire ====
- St Peter's Church, Deene
- St Peter's Church, Lowick
- St Peter's Church, Lutton
- St Peter's Church, Northampton
- St Peter's Church, Raunds
- St Peter's Church, Irthlingborough

==== Nottinghamshire ====
- St Peter's Church, Clayworth
- St Peter's Church, East Bridgford
- St Peter's Church, East Drayton
- St Peter's Church, Farndon
- St Peter's Church, Flawford
- St Peter's Church, Gamston
- St Peter's Church, Hayton
- St Peter's Church, Headon-cum-Upton
- St Peter's Church, Laneham
- St Peter's Church, Nottingham
- St Peter's Church, Radford
- St Peter's Church, Ruddington
- St Peter's Church, Tollerton

==== Oxfordshire ====
- St Peter-in-the-East, Oxford
- Church of St Peter-le-Bailey, Oxford
- St Peter's Church, Wallingford

==== Rutland ====
- St Peter's Church, Barrowden
- St Peter's Church, Belton-in-Rutland
- St Peter's Church, Brooke, Rutland
- St Peter's Church, Empingham
- St Peter's Church, Tickencote

==== Shropshire ====
- St Peter's Church, Adderley
- St Peter's Church, Chelmarsh
- St Peter's Church, Cound
- St Peter's Church, Edgmond
- St Peter's Church, Wrockwardine

==== Somerset ====
- St Peter's Church, Camerton Park
- St Peter's Church, Catcott
- St Peter's Church, Combwich
- Church of St Peter, Draycott
- St Peter's Church, Englishcombe
- St Peter's Church, Evercreech
- St Peter's Church, Exton
- Church of St Peter, Freshford
- St Peter's Church, Hornblotton
- St Peter's Church, Huish Champflower
- Church of St Peter, Ilton
- St Peter's Church, Langford Budville
- Church of St Peter, Lydford-on-Fosse
- Church of St Peter, Marksbury
- Church of St Peter, North Newton
- Church of St Peter, North Wootton
- St Peter's Church, Portishead
- Church of St Peter, Redlynch
- Church of St Peter, South Barrow
- St Peter's Church, Staple Fitzpaine
- St Peter's Church, Treborough
- St Peter's Church, West Huntspill
- Church of St Peter, Williton
- Church of St Peter, Yeovilton

==== Staffordshire ====
- St Peter's Church, Alstonefield
- St Peter's Church, Elford
- St Peter's Church, Marchington
- St Peter's Church, Stapenhill
- Church of St Peter, Yoxall

==== South Yorkshire ====
- St Peter's Church, Barnburgh
- St Peter's Church, Conisbrough
- St. Peter's Parish Church, Edlington
- St Peter's Church, Letwell
- St Peter's Church, Warmsworth

==== Suffolk ====
- St Peter's Church, Carlton Colville
- St Peter's Church, Claydon
- St Peter's Church, Henley
- St Peter's Church, Ipswich
- St Peter's Church, Sudbury
- St Peter's Church, Theberton

==== Surrey ====
- Church of St Peter, Limpsfield
- St Peter's Church, Old Woking
- St Peter's Church, Wrecclesham

==== Tyne and Wear ====
- St Peter's Church, Monkwearmouth
- St Peter's Church, Wallsend

==== Warwickshire ====
- St Peter's Church, Binton
- St Peter's Church, Leamington Spa
- St Peter's Church, Welford-on-Avon
- St Peter's Church, Wolfhampcote
- St Peter's Church, Wormleighton

==== West Midlands ====
- St Peter's Church, Bickenhill
- St Peter's Roman Catholic Church, Bloxwich
- St Peter's Church, Dale End, Birmingham
- St Peter's Church, Hall Green, Birmingham
- St Peter's Church, Handsworth, Birmingham
- St Peter's Church, Harborne, Birmingham
- St Peter's Church, Spring Hill, Birmingham
- St Peter's Church, Walsall
- St Peter's Collegiate Church, Wolverhampton

==== West Sussex ====
- St Peter's Church, Ardingly
- St Peter's Church, Henfield
- St Peter's Church, Selsey
- St Peter's Church, Shoreham-by-Sea
- St Peter's Church, Twineham

==== West Yorkshire ====
- Leeds Minster, Minster and Parish Church of Saint Peter-at-Leeds
- St Peter's Church, Addingham
- St Peter's Church, Birstall
- St Peter's Church, Huddersfield
- St Peter's Church, Walton, Leeds
- St Peter's Church, Stanley, West Yorkshire
- St Peter's Church, Thorner

==== Wiltshire ====
- Church of St Peter, Clyffe Pypard
- St Peter's Church, Devizes
- St Peter's Church, Everleigh

==== Worcestershire ====
- Church of St Peter, Cowleigh

=== Northern Ireland ===
- St Peter's Church, Belfast

=== Scotland ===
- St Peter's Church, Aberdeen
- St Peter's Church, Edinburgh
- St Peter's Church, Linlithgow
- Old St Peter's Church, Peterhead
- St Peter's Kirk, Sandwick, Orkney
- Old St Peter's Church, Thurso

=== Wales ===
- St Peter's Church, Llanbedrgoch, Anglesey
- St Peter's Church, Newborough, Anglesey
- St Peter's Church, Roath, Cardiff
- St Peter's Church, Carmarthen, Carmarthenshire
- St Peter's Church, Lampeter, Ceredigion
- Old St Peter's Church, Llanbedr Dyffryn Clwyd, Denbighshire
- St Peter's Church, Ruthin, Denbighshire
- St Peter's Church, Bryngwyn, Monmouthshire
- St Peter's Church, Dixton, Monmouthshire
- St Peter's Church, Wentlooge, Newport
- St Peter's Church, Glasbury, Powys
- St Peter's Church, Pentre, Rhondda Cynon Taf
- St Peter's Church, Peterston-super-Ely, Vale of Glamorgan

== United States ==
=== Alaska ===
- St. Peter's Episcopal Church (Seward, Alaska)
- St. Peter's Church (Sitka, Alaska)

=== Connecticut ===
- St. Peter Church (Bridgeport, Connecticut)
- Church of St. Peter (Danbury, Connecticut)
- St. Peter's Episcopal Church (Milford, Connecticut)

=== Delaware ===
- St. Peter's Episcopal Church (Lewes, Delaware)

=== District of Columbia ===
- St. Peter's Church (Washington, D.C.)

=== Illinois ===
- St. Peter's in the Loop, Chicago
- Cathedral of Saint Peter (Rockford, Illinois)
- St. Peter's Episcopal Church (Sycamore, Illinois)

=== Iowa ===
- St. Peters United Evangelical Lutheran Church, Ceres
- St. Peter's Catholic Church (Council Bluffs, Iowa)
- St. Peter Church (Keokuk, Iowa)

=== Kansas ===
- Cathedral of Saint Peter (Kansas City, Kansas)

=== Kentucky ===
- St. Peter's AME Church, Harrodsburg

=== Maryland ===
- St. Peter's Episcopal Church, Baltimore
- St. Peter's Pro-Cathedral, Baltimore
- St. Peter the Apostle Church, Baltimore
- St. Peter's Church (Queenstown, Maryland)
- St. Peter's Chapel, Solomons

=== Massachusetts ===
- St. Peter Parish, Norwood
- St. Peter's Roman Catholic Church-St. Mary's School, Southbridge
- St. Peters Catholic Church (Worcester, Massachusetts)

=== Michigan ===
- St. Peter's Lutheran Church (Kinde, Michigan)

=== Minnesota ===
- Church of St. Peter (Gentilly Township, Minnesota)
- Saint Peter's Church (Mendota, Minnesota)

=== Mississippi ===
- St. Peter's Episcopal Church (Oxford, Mississippi)

=== Missouri ===
- St. Peter's Episcopal Church (Harrisonville, Missouri)
- St. Peter's Church (Kansas City, Missouri)
- St. Peter's Catholic Church (Rensselaer, Missouri)

=== Montana ===
- St. Peter's Mission Church and Cemetery
- St. Peter's Catholic Church (Wibaux, Montana)

=== Nebraska ===
- St. Peter's Episcopal Church (Neligh, Nebraska)

=== Nevada ===
- St. Peter's Episcopal Church (Carson City, Nevada)

=== New Jersey ===
- St. Peter's Episcopal Church (Clarksboro, New Jersey)
- St. Peter's Episcopal Church (Freehold Borough, New Jersey)
- St. Peter's Episcopal Church (Morristown, New Jersey)
- St. Peter's Episcopal Church (Perth Amboy, New Jersey)
- St. Peters Church and Buildings, Spotswood

=== New York ===
- St. Peter's Episcopal Church (Albany, New York)
- St. Peter's Episcopal Church Complex (Auburn, New York)
- St. Peter's Episcopal Church (Bloomfield, New York)
- St. Peter's Church, Chapel and Cemetery Complex, Bronx
- St. Peter's Episcopal Church (Geneva, New York)
- St. Peter's Episcopal Church Complex (Hobart, New York)
- St. Peter's Church (Hyde Park, New York)
- St. Peter's Church (Staten Island)
- St. Peter's Church (Manhattan)
- St. Peter's Episcopal Church (Manhattan)
- St. Peter's Lutheran Church under the Citigroup Center in Manhattan
- St. Peter's Episcopal Church (Niagara Falls, New York)
- St. Peter's Episcopal Church (Peekskill, New York)
- St. Peter's Episcopal Church (Port Chester, New York)
- Evangelical Lutheran Church of St. Peter, Rhinebeck
- St. Peter's Lutheran Church and School, Sanborn
- St. Peter's Presbyterian Church, Spencertown
- Old St. Peter's Church (Van Cortlandtville, New York)
- St. Peter's Lutheran Church and School, Walmore

=== North Carolina ===
- St. Peter's Catholic Church (Charlotte, North Carolina)
- St. Peter's AME Zion Church, New Bern

=== Ohio ===
- St. Peter's Catholic Church (Canton, Ohio)
- Cathedral Basilica of St. Peter in Chains, Cincinnati
- St. Peter Church (Cleveland, Ohio)
- St. Peter's Evangelical Lutheran Church (Lancaster, Ohio)
- St. Peter's Church (Mansfield, Ohio)
- St. Peter's Evangelical Lutheran Church (Versailles, Ohio)

=== Oregon ===
- St. Peter's Roman Catholic Church (The Dalles, Oregon)
- St. Peter's Roman Catholic Church (Echo, Oregon)

=== Pennsylvania ===
- St. Peter's Church (Brownsville, Pennsylvania)
- St. Peter's Anglican Church (Butler, Pennsylvania)
- St. Peter's Kierch, Middletown, Dauphin County
- St. Peter's Episcopal Church (Philadelphia)
- St. Peter's Church in the Great Valley, Phoenixville
- St. Peter's Episcopal Church (Pittsburgh)
- St. Peter's Anglican Church (Uniontown, Pennsylvania)

=== South Carolina ===
- St. Peter's Roman Catholic Church (Columbia, South Carolina) or Basilica of St. Peter

=== South Dakota ===
- St. Peter's Lutheran Church (Dell Rapids, South Dakota)
- St. Peter's Catholic Church (Jefferson, South Dakota)

=== Tennessee ===
- St. Peter's Episcopal Church (Columbia, Tennessee)

=== Texas ===
- St. Peter's Roman Catholic Church (Boerne, Texas)
- St. Peter's Roman Catholic Church (Lindsay, Texas)
- St. Peter's Episcopal Church (McKinney, Texas)

=== Virginia ===
- St. Peter's Church and Mount St. Joseph Convent Complex, Rutland
- St. Peter's Episcopal Church (Norfolk, Virginia)
- St. Peter's Episcopal Church (Oak Grove, Virginia)
- St. Peter's Pro-Cathedral (Richmond, Virginia)
- St. Peter's Church (Talleysville, Virginia)

=== Washington ===
- St. Peter's Church (Tacoma, Washington)

=== West Virginia ===
- St. Peter's Roman Catholic Church (Harpers Ferry, West Virginia)

=== Wisconsin ===
- St. Peter's Roman Catholic Church (Ashton, Wisconsin)
- St. Peter's Evangelical Lutheran Church (Milwaukee, Wisconsin)
- St. Peter's and St. Joseph's Catholic Churches, Oconto
- St. Peter's Episcopal Church (Ripon, Wisconsin)
- St. Peter's Church (West Bend, Wisconsin)

=== Wyoming ===
- St. Peter's Episcopal Church (Sheridan, Wyoming)

== Vatican City ==
- St. Peter's Basilica

== See also ==
- St. Peter's (disambiguation)
- St. Peter's Abbey (disambiguation)
- St. Peter's Anglican Church (disambiguation)
- St. Peter's Basilica (disambiguation)
- St. Peter's-By-The-Sea (disambiguation)
- St. Peter's Cathedral (disambiguation)
- St. Peter's Catholic Church (disambiguation)
- St. Peter's Cemetery (disambiguation)
- St. Peter's Episcopal Church (disambiguation)
- St. Peter's Evangelical Lutheran Church (disambiguation)
- St. Peter's Lutheran Church (disambiguation)
- St. Peter's Roman Catholic Church (disambiguation)
- St Mary and St Peter's Church (disambiguation)
- St. Peter and St. Paul's Church (disambiguation)
