= St. Peter's Episcopal Church =

St. Peter's Episcopal Church may refer to:

- St. Peter's Episcopal Church (Seward, Alaska), listed on the NRHP in Alaska
- St. Peter's Episcopal Church (Milford, Connecticut)
- St. Peter's Episcopal Church (Lewes, Delaware)
- St. Peter's Episcopal Church (Sycamore, Illinois)
- St. Peter's Episcopal Church (Oxford, Mississippi), on National Register of Historic Places listings in Mississippi
- St. Peter's Episcopal Church (Harrisonville, Missouri)
- St. Peter's Episcopal Church (Neligh, Nebraska), on National Register of Historic Places listings in Nebraska
- St. Peter's Episcopal Church (Carson City, Nevada)
- St. Peter's Episcopal Church (Albany, New York)
- St. Peter's Episcopal Church Complex (Auburn, New York)
- St. Peter's Episcopal Church (Bloomfield, New York)
- St. Peter's Episcopal Church (Geneva, New York)
- St. Peter's Episcopal Church Complex (Hobart, New York)
- St. Peter's Episcopal Church (Manhattan), New York, founded in 1831
- St. Peter's Episcopal Church (Niagara Falls, New York), designed by Henry C. Dudley
- St. Peter's Episcopal Church (Peekskill, New York)
- St. Peter's Episcopal Church (Port Chester, New York)
- St. Peter's Episcopal Church (Clarksboro, New Jersey)
- St. Peter's Episcopal Church (Freehold Borough, New Jersey)
- St. Peter's Episcopal Church (Morristown, New Jersey)
- St. Peter's Episcopal Church (Perth Amboy, New Jersey)
- St. Peter's Episcopal Church (Butler, Pennsylvania), NRHP historic district contributing property
- St. Peter's Episcopal Church (Uniontown, Pennsylvania), NRHP historic district contributing property
- St. Peter's Episcopal Church (Philadelphia)
- St. Peter's Episcopal Church (Pittsburgh), Pennsylvania
- St. Peter's Episcopal Church (Columbia, Tennessee)
- St. Peter's Episcopal Church (McKinney, Texas)
- St. Peter's Episcopal Church (Norfolk, Virginia), listed on the NRHP in Norfolk, Virginia
- St. Peter's Episcopal Church (Oak Grove, Virginia)
- St. Peter's Episcopal Church (Tacoma, Washington), on National Register of Historic Places, Pierce County, Washington
- St. Peter's Episcopal Church (Ripon, Wisconsin)
- St. Peter's Episcopal Church (Sheridan, Wyoming)

== See also ==
- St. Peter's Church (disambiguation)
- St. Peter's Anglican Church (disambiguation)
