= St. Peter's Lutheran Church =

St. Peter's Lutheran Church may refer to:

- St. Peter's Lutheran Church in Dell Rapids, South Dakota, United States
- St Peter's Lutheran Church, Hobart in Warrane, Tasmania, Australia
- St. Peter's Lutheran Church in Kinde, Michigan, United States
- St. Peter's Lutheran Church (Manhattan) under the Citigroup Center in Manhattan, New York, United States
- St. Peter's Lutheran Church in Monrovia, Liberia, scene of the Monrovia Church massacre
- St. Peter's Lutheran Church in Ottawa, Ontario, Canada
