= St. Peter's Catholic Church =

St. Peter's Catholic Church or St. Peters Catholic Church may refer to:

- St. Peter's Catholic Church (Charlotte, North Carolina)
- St. Peter's Catholic Church (Council Bluffs, Iowa), listed on the NRHP in Iowa
- St. Peters Catholic Church (Worcester, Massachusetts), listed on the NRHP in Massachusetts
- St. Peter's Catholic Church (St. Charles, Missouri), whose 1848-built historic building was the only one similar to Old Stone Church (Chesterfield, Missouri)
- St. Peter's Catholic Church (Rensselaer, Missouri), listed on the NRHP in Missouri
- St. Peter's Catholic Church (Wibaux, Montana), listed on the NRHP in Montana
- St. Peter's Catholic Church (Jefferson, South Dakota), listed on the NRHP in South Dakota
- St. Peter's and St. Joseph's Catholic Churches, Oconto, Wisconsin, listed on the NRHP in Wisconsin
- St. Peter's Catholic Church (Canton, Ohio)
- St. Peter Catholic Church (Manhattan)
- St. Peter's Catholic Church (Portland, Maine)

== See also ==
- St. Peter's Church (disambiguation)
- St. Peter's Roman Catholic Church (disambiguation)
