= St. Peter's Evangelical Lutheran Church =

St. Peter's Evangelical Lutheran Churchmay refer to:

== United States ==
- Saint Peter's Evangelical Lutheran Church (St. Peter, Minnesota), which once had a Wangerin Organ Company organ
- St. Peter's Evangelical Lutheran Church (Lancaster, Ohio), listed on the NRHP in Fairfield County, Ohio
- St. Peter's Evangelical Lutheran Church (Versailles, Ohio), listed on the NRHP in Darke County, Ohio as St. Peter Evangelical Lutheran Church
- St. Peter's Evangelical Lutheran Church (Milwaukee, Wisconsin), listed on the NRHP in Wisconsin
