= St. Peter's Basilica (disambiguation) =

St. Peter's Basilica is a church in Vatican City.

St. Peter's Basilica may also refer to:

- Basilica of St Paul, Rabat, Malta
- Cathedral Basilica of St. Peter in Chains, Cincinnati, U.S.
- Đakovo Cathedral, or Cathedral basilica of St. Peter, in Croatia
- Frascati Cathedral, or Cathedral Basilica of St. Peter Apostle, in Italy
- Old St. Peter's Basilica, where the new St. Peter's Basilica stands today in Vatican City
- St. Peter's Basilica, Columbia, South Carolina, United States
- St. Peter's Basilica, Guimarães, Portugal
- St. Peter's Basilica Church, Stari Trg, Kosovo
- St Peter's Cathedral Basilica, Kumasi, Ghana
- St. Peter's Cathedral Basilica (London, Ontario), Canada

== See also ==
- St. Peter's Cathedral (disambiguation)
- St. Peter's Church (disambiguation)
