= St Peter's Church, Liverdun =

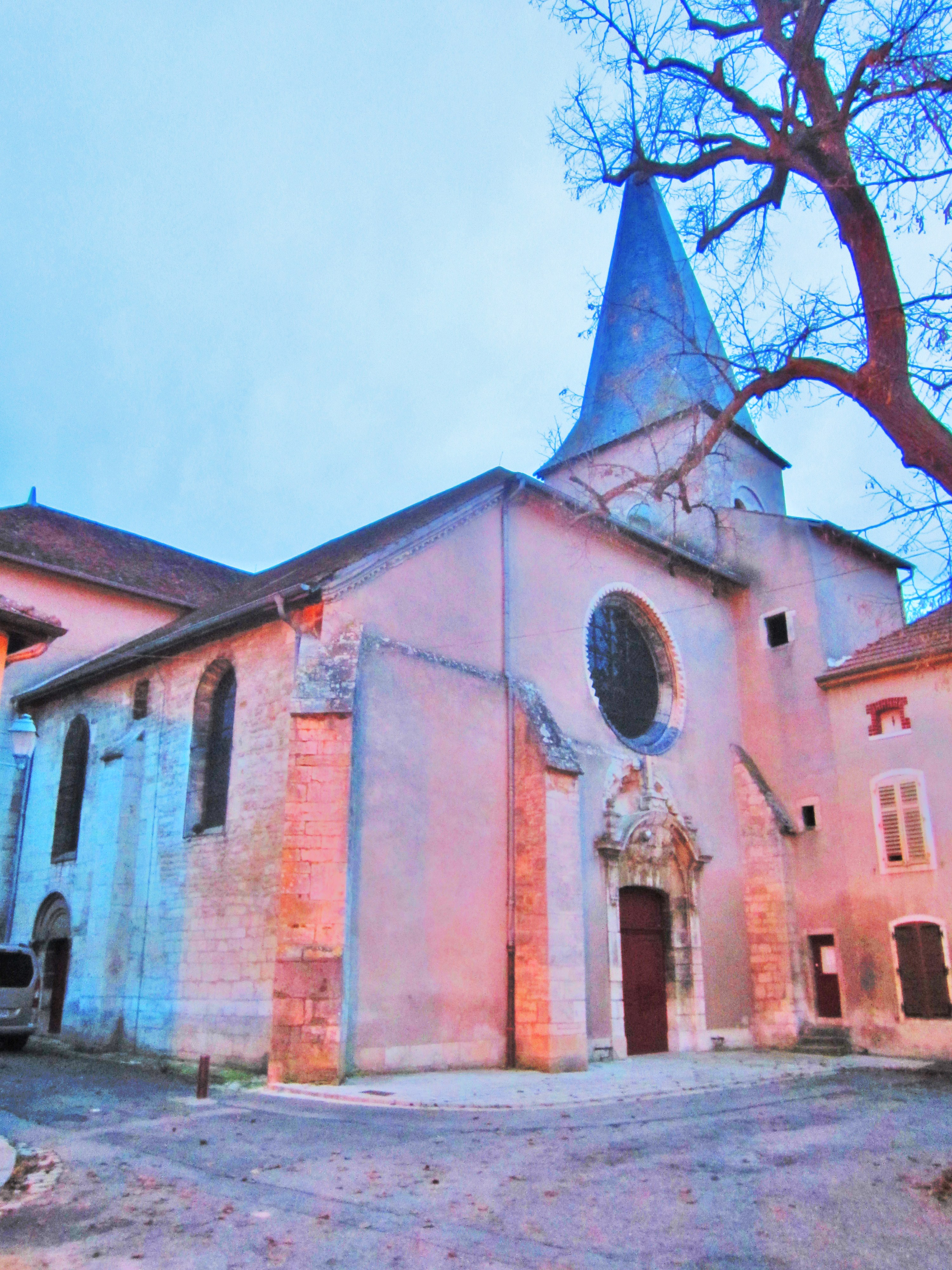
- St Peter's Church, Liverdun
- 48°45′08″N 6°03′49″E
- Location: Liverdun; Meurthe-et-Moselle, Grand Est
- Country: France
- Denomination: Roman Catholic Church

History
- Status: Parish church
- Founded: 12th century

Architecture
- Heritage designation: Monument historique
- Designated: November 25, 1924
- Architectural type: Romanesque church

St Peter's Church (French: église Saint-Pierre de Liverdun) is a 12th-century Roman Catholic parish church in Liverdun, Meurthe-et-Moselle, France. It has been classified as a monument historique by the Ministry of Culture since 1924.

== Location ==
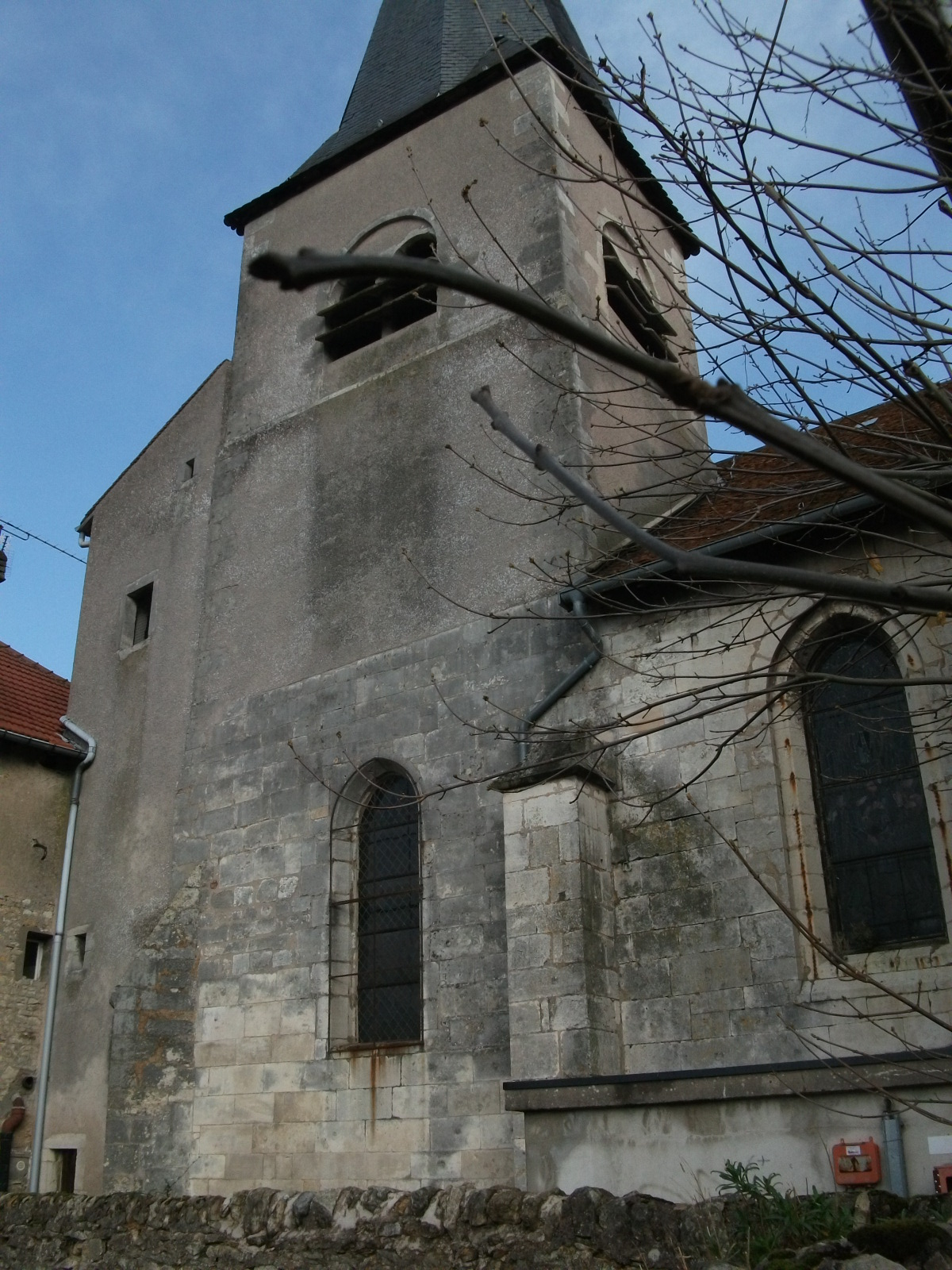
The tower.

The church stands at the heart of the upper town, which had fortifications in the Middle Ages. Its entrance portal looks out onto a square on which stands a mission cross and the portal of the clergy house, both classified monuments and historiques.

== History ==
St Peter's Church is a former collegiate church with a Romanesque tower and a modern belltower. Its 12th-century nave and side aisles have capitals. The transept also dates back to the 12th century, yet its chevet was modified in the 18th and 19th centuries.

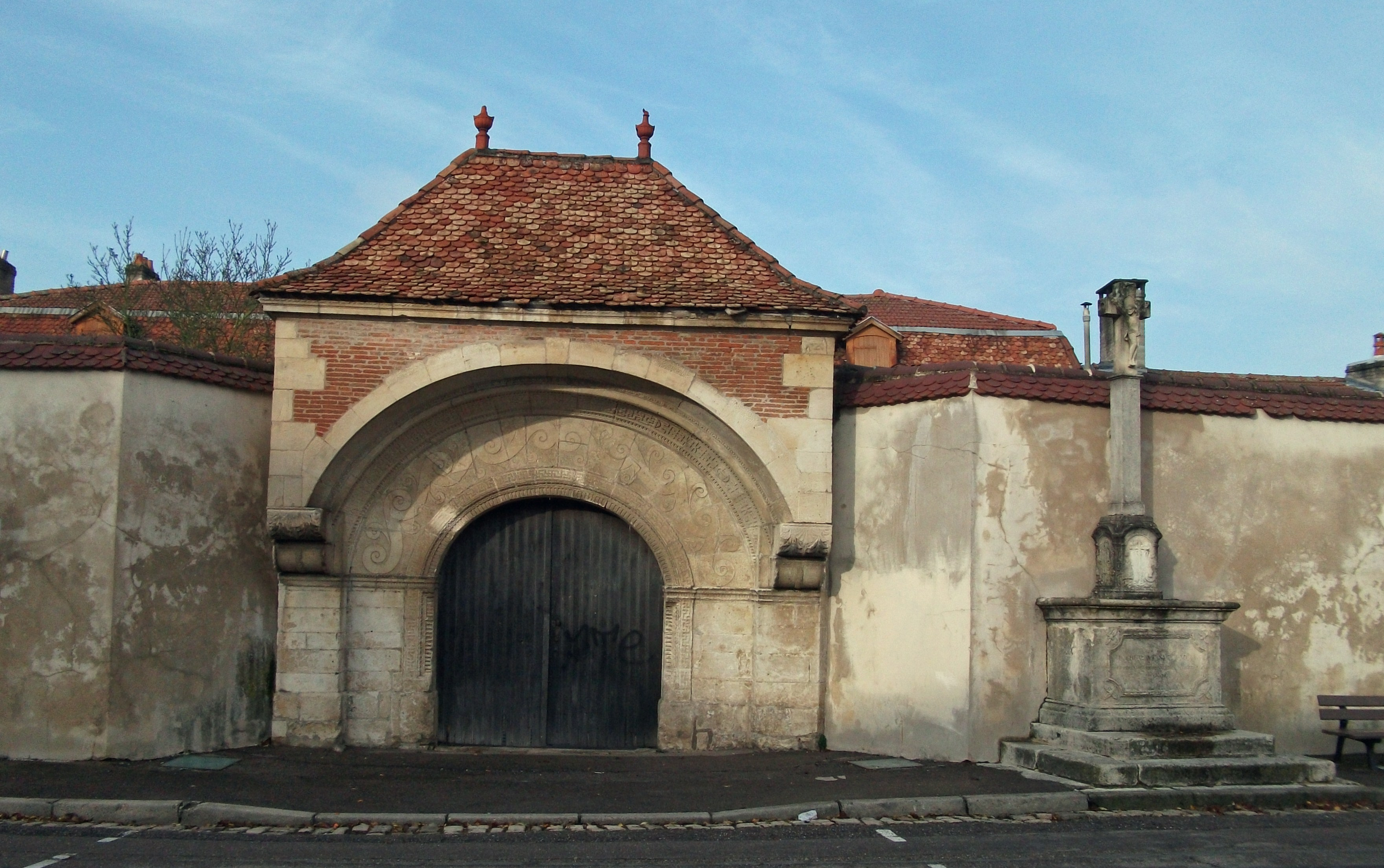
Mission cross and the portal.

The church houses the tombstone of Saint Euchaire— a 16th-century Renaissance gisant in a funeral niche. The interior is also decorated with 18th-century paintings and old mural paintings.

The building was classified as a monument historique by an order on November 25, 1924.

== Organs ==
As the pipe organs were in poor condition, a new order was passed to Claude Ignace Callinet. However, the current organ is still in its original state. Its instrumental part is still used and has been a classified monument historique since 1984.

== Portals ==
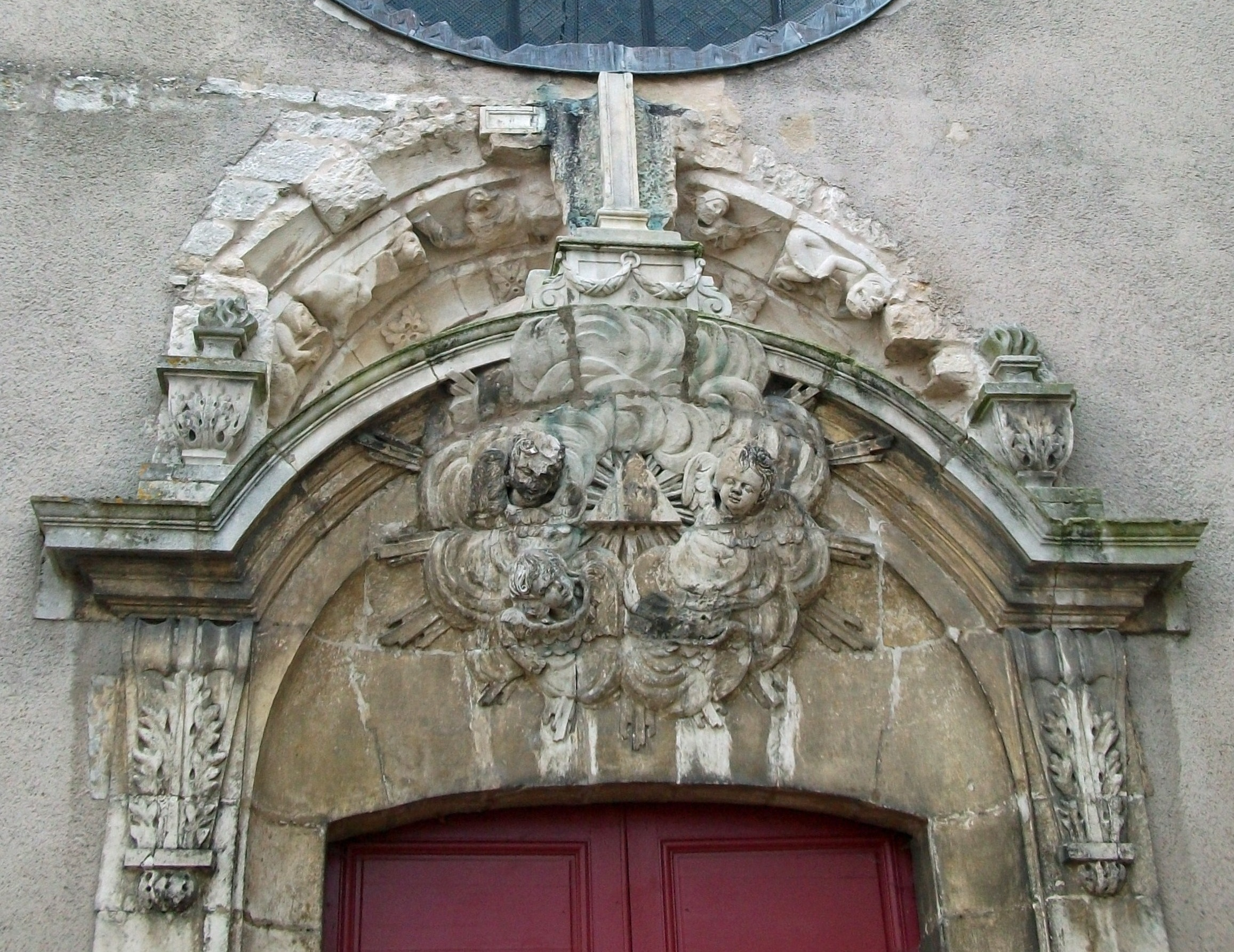
Close view of the portal.

The western portal was modified but a part of the old sculpture is still visible today.

== Photographs ==
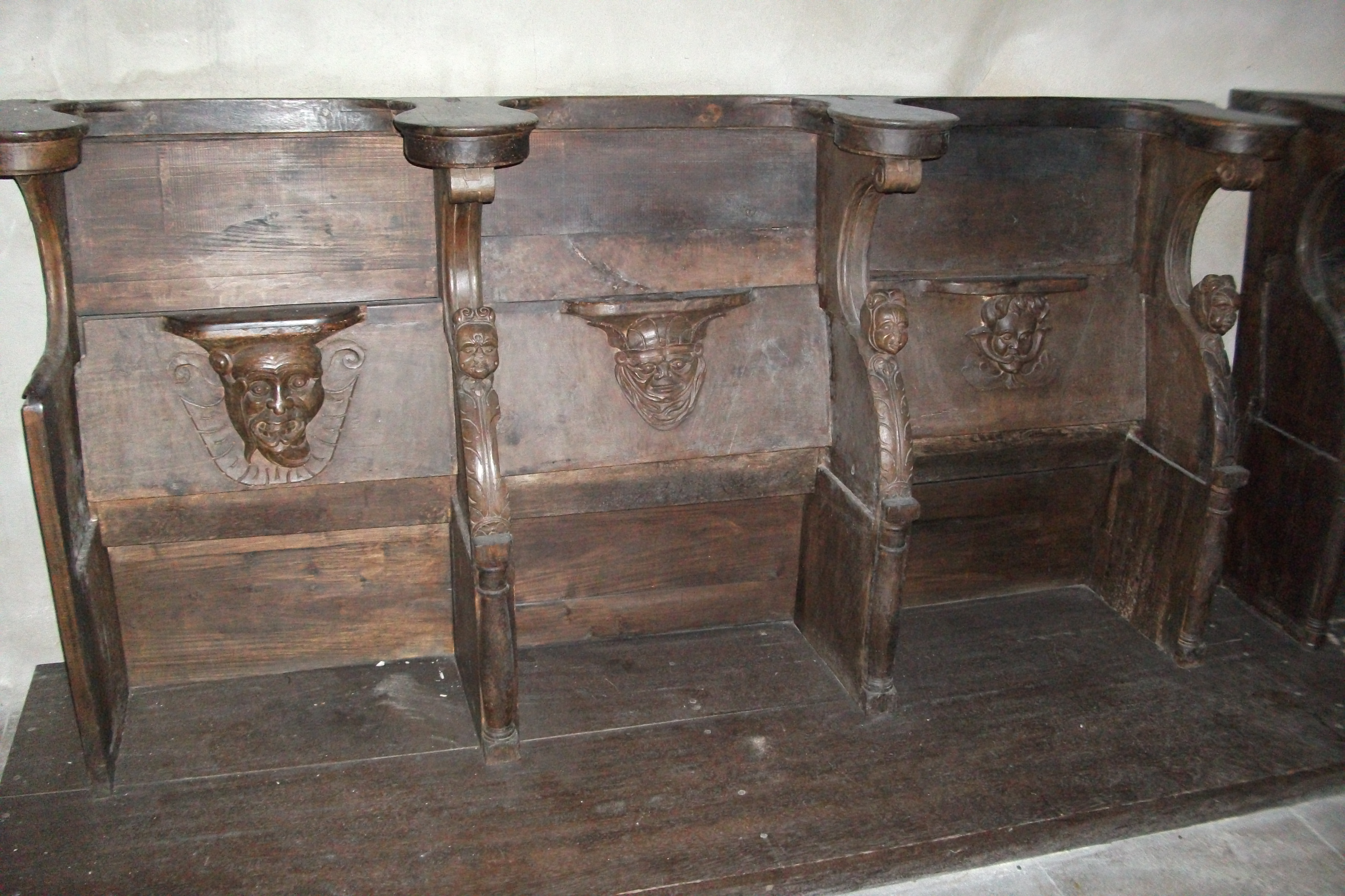
Carved Stalls.

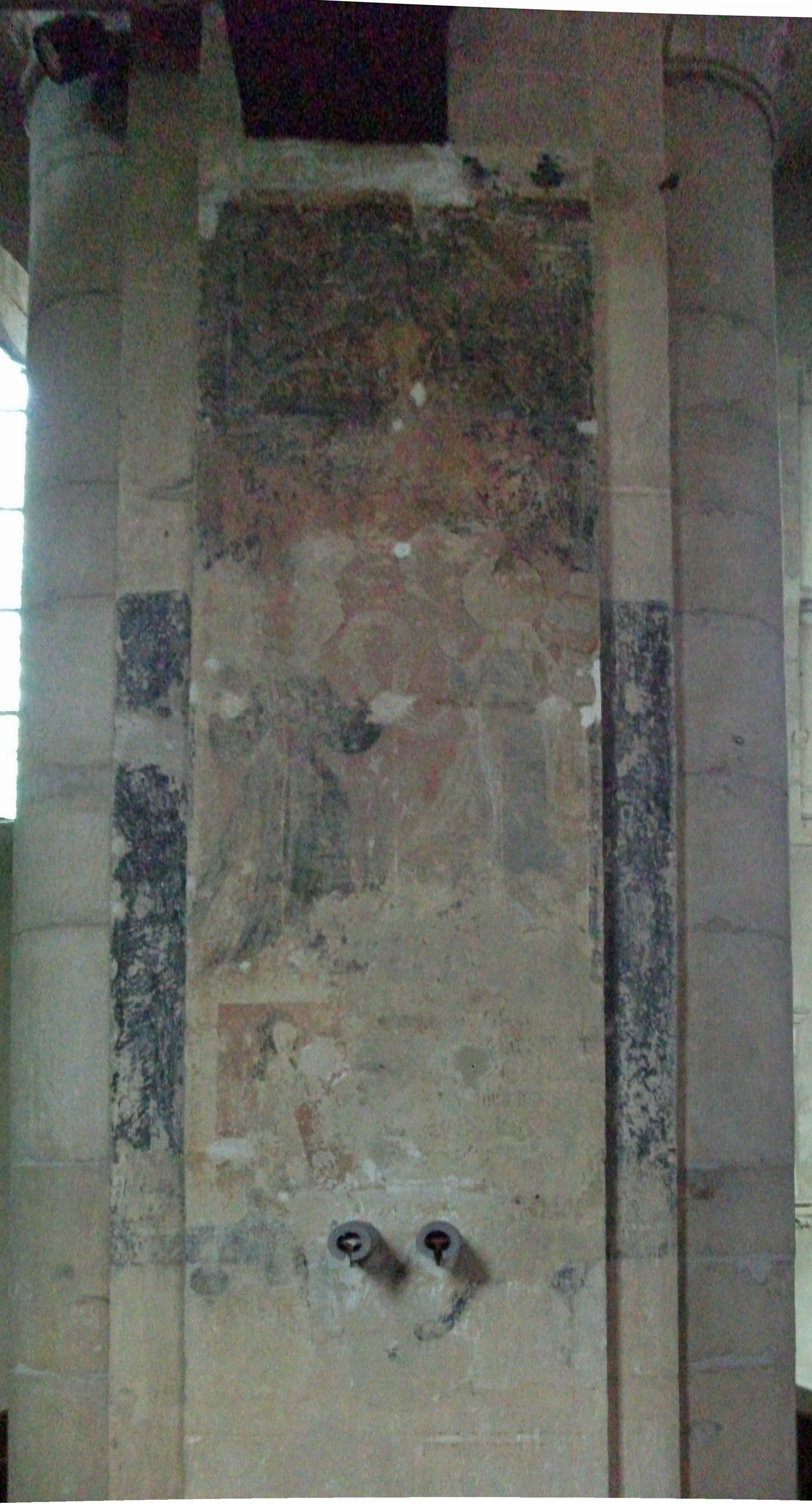
Murals.

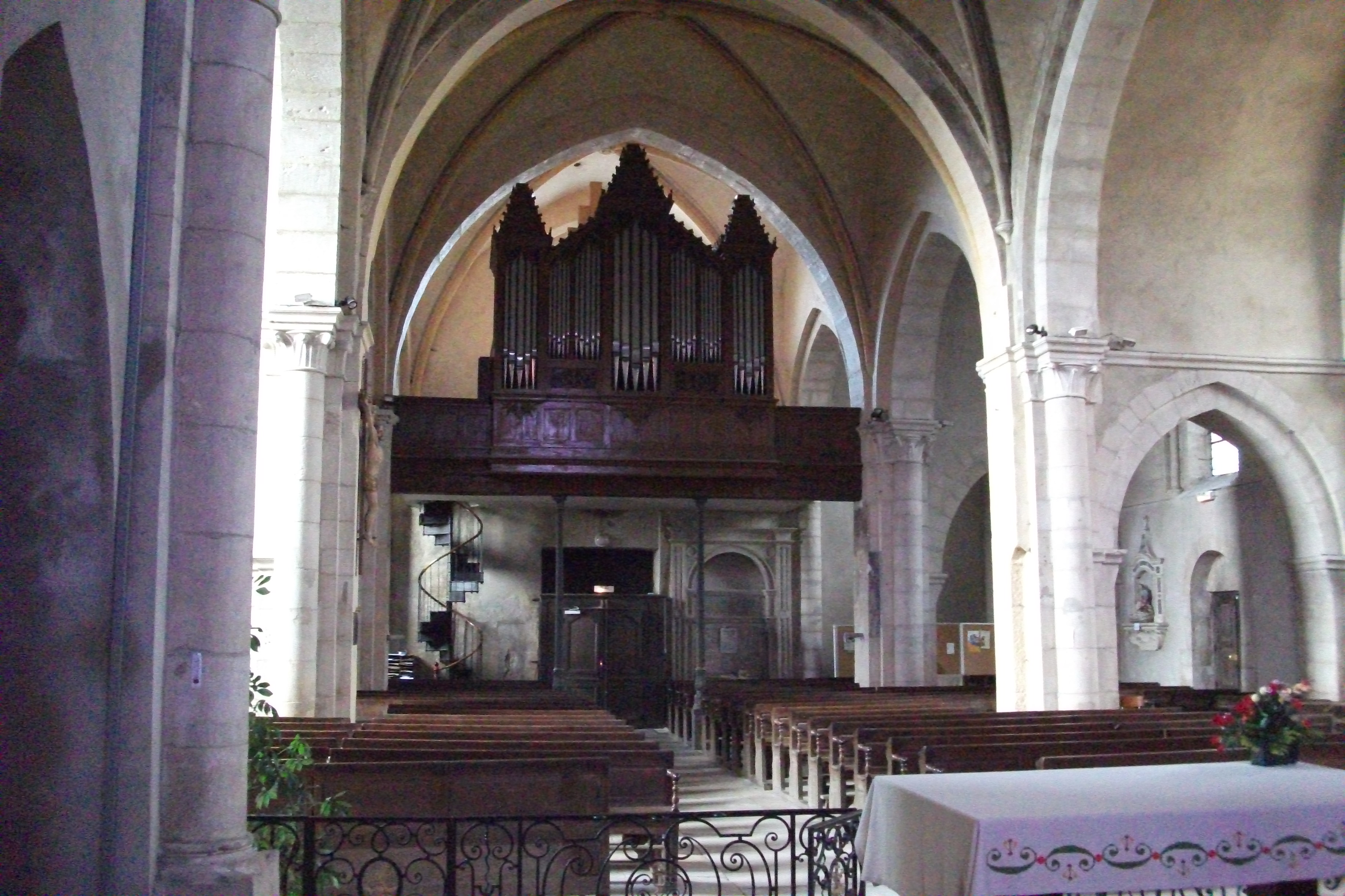
Organs.

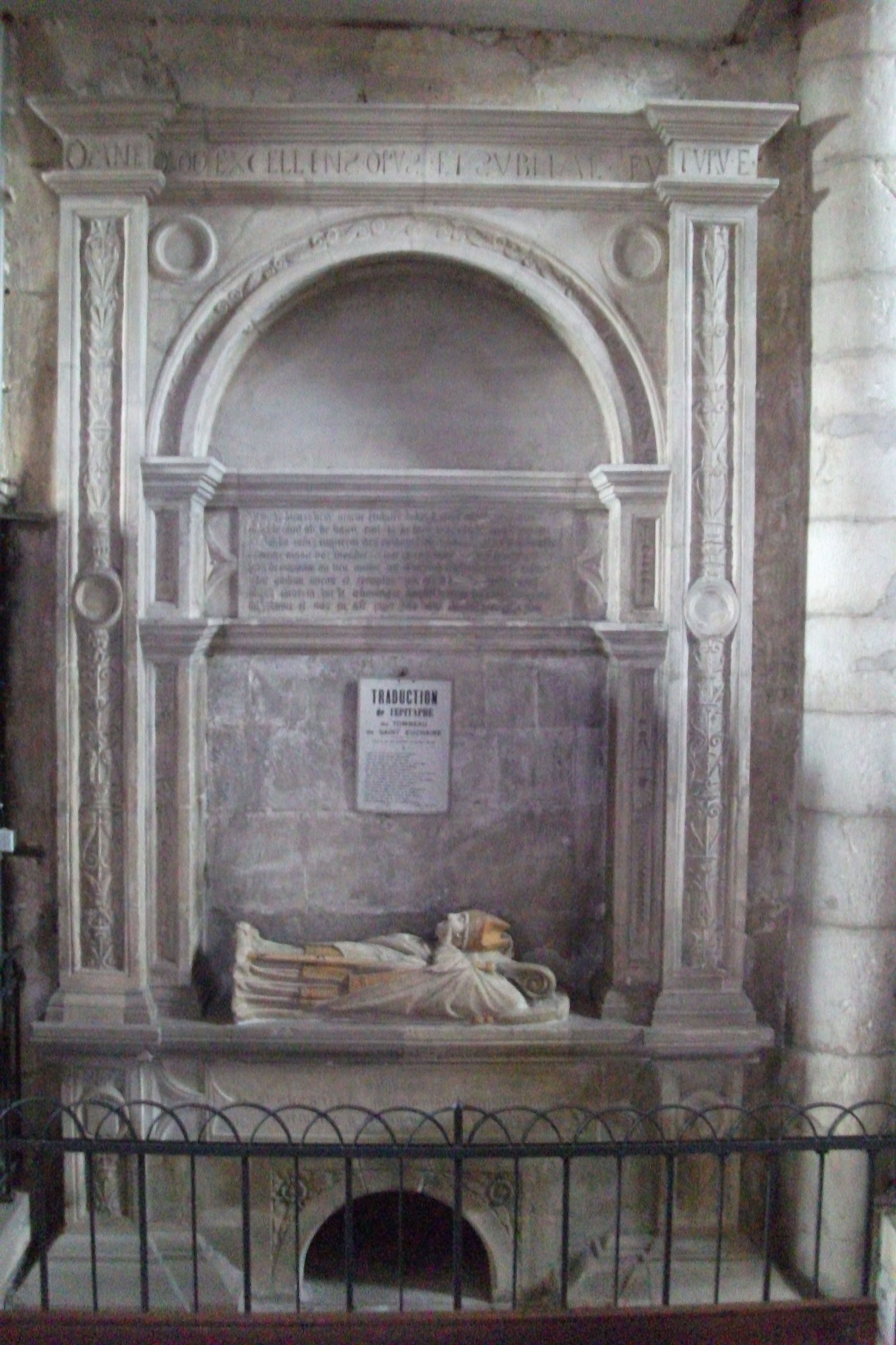
The gisant of Saint Euchaire.

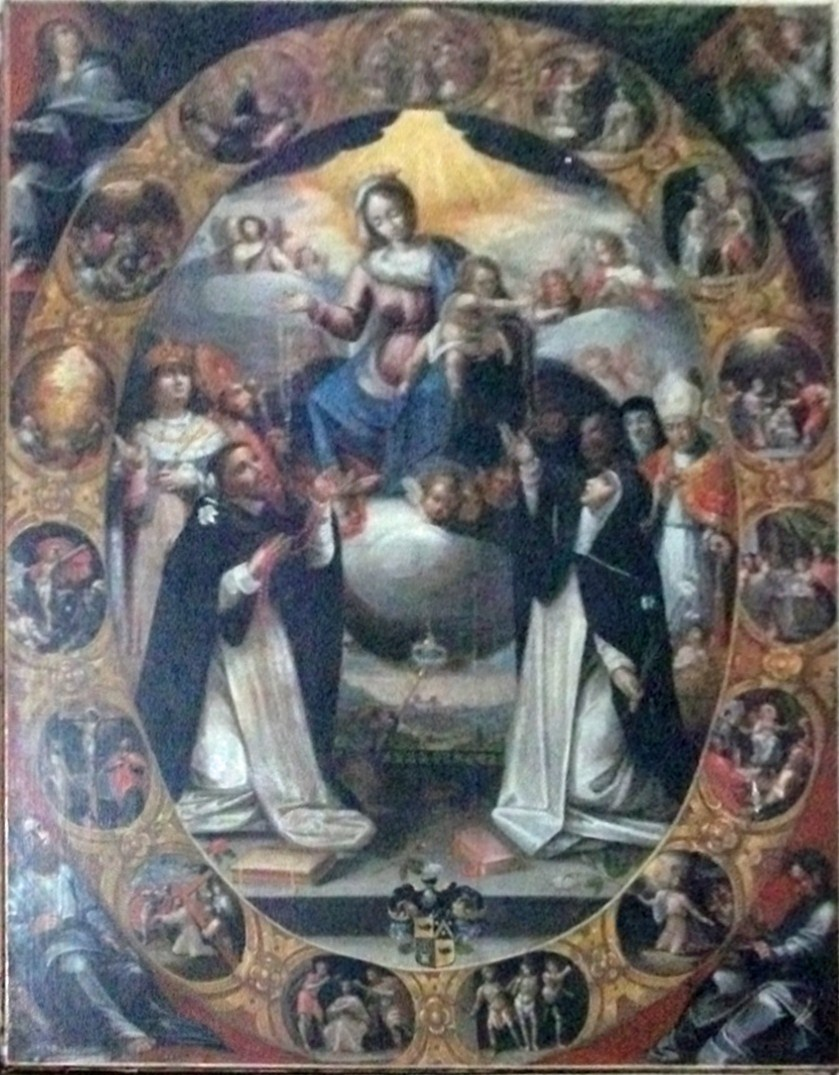
The Virgin Mary giving the belt to Saint Augustine et Saint Monica.

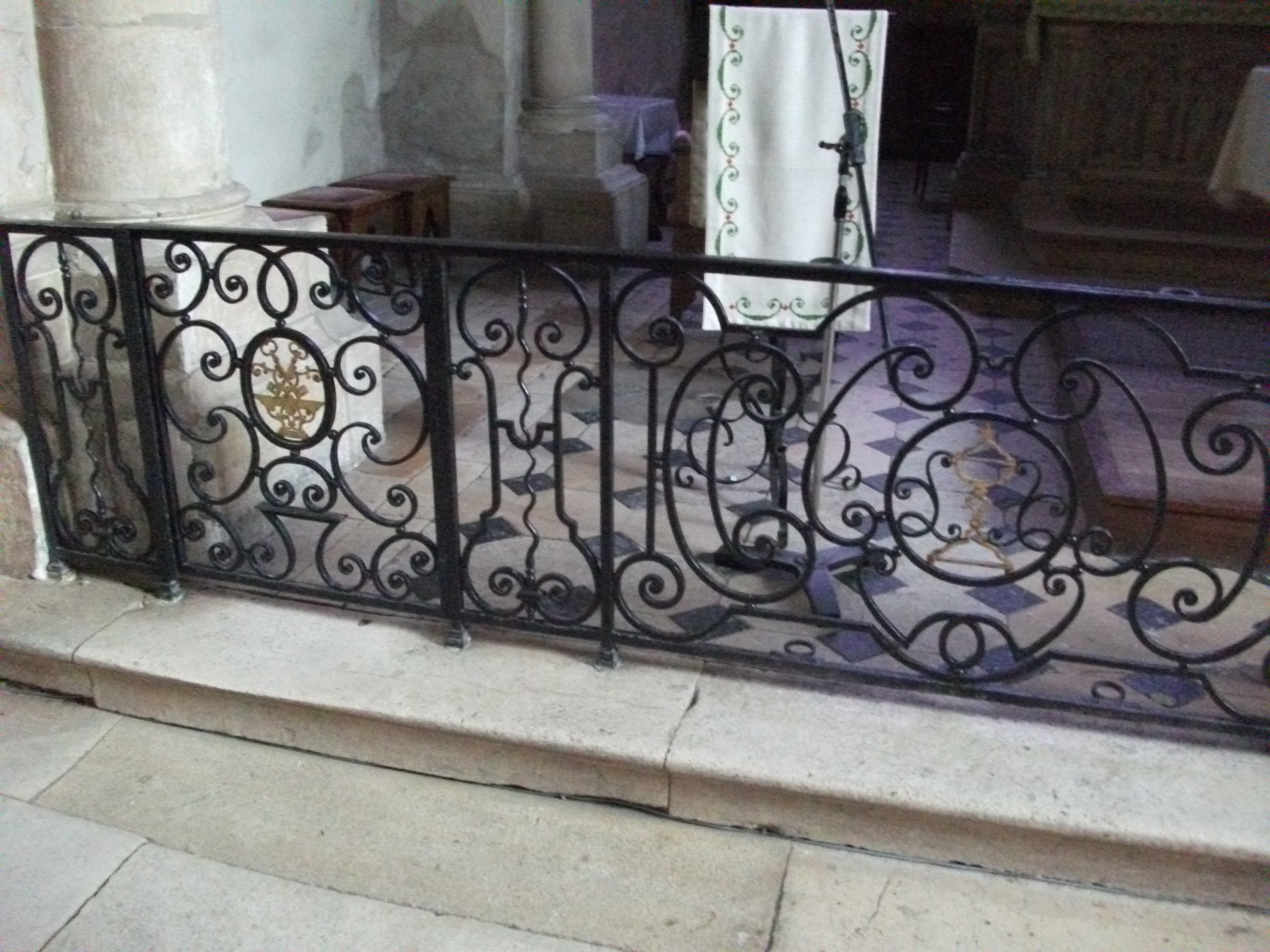
Railings in the choir.

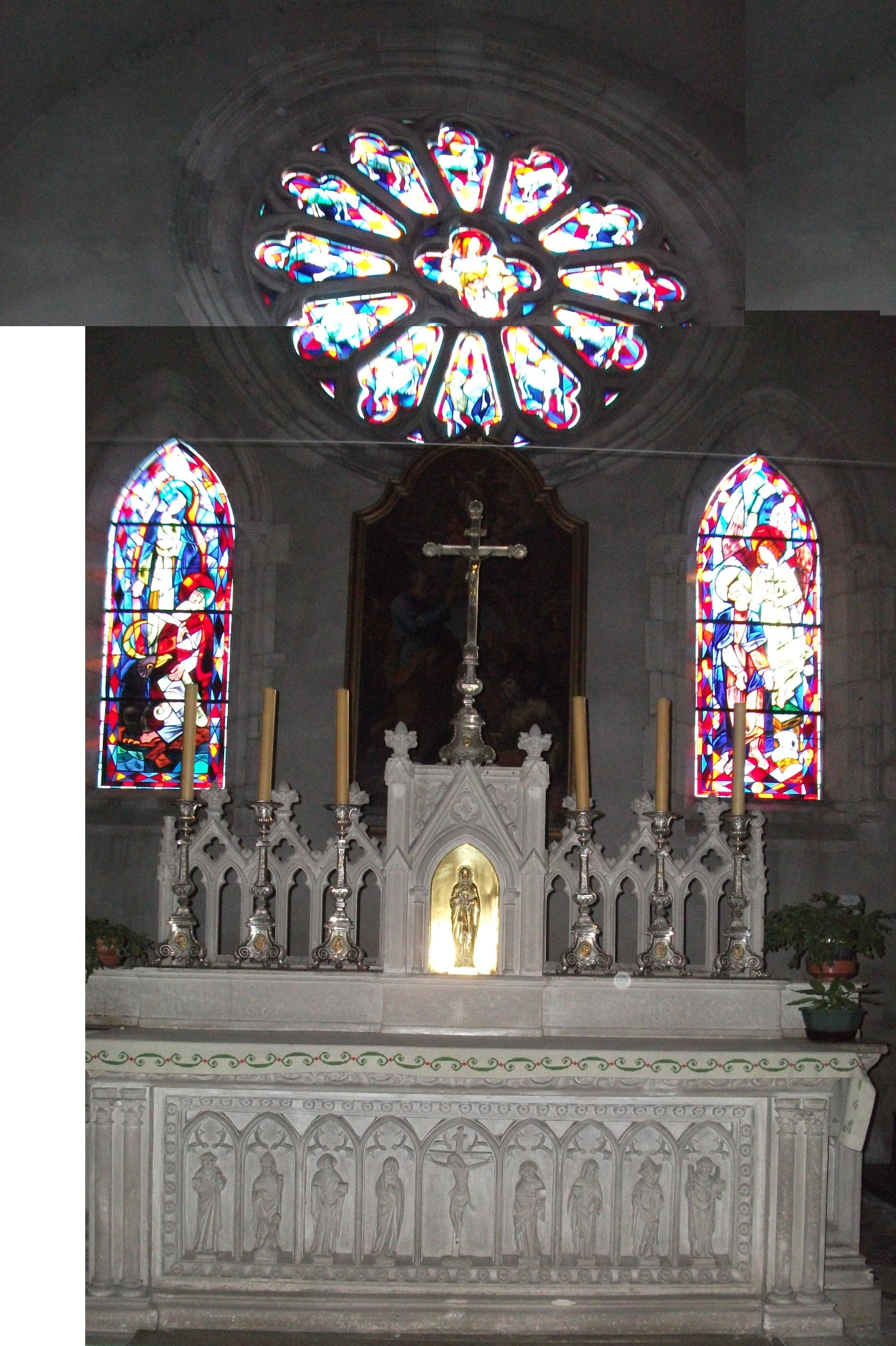
The front of the altar (monument historique).
