= St. Peter's Church, Capernaum =

Coordinates: 32.8806°N 35.5754°E

St. Peter's Church
- כנסיית בית פטרוס
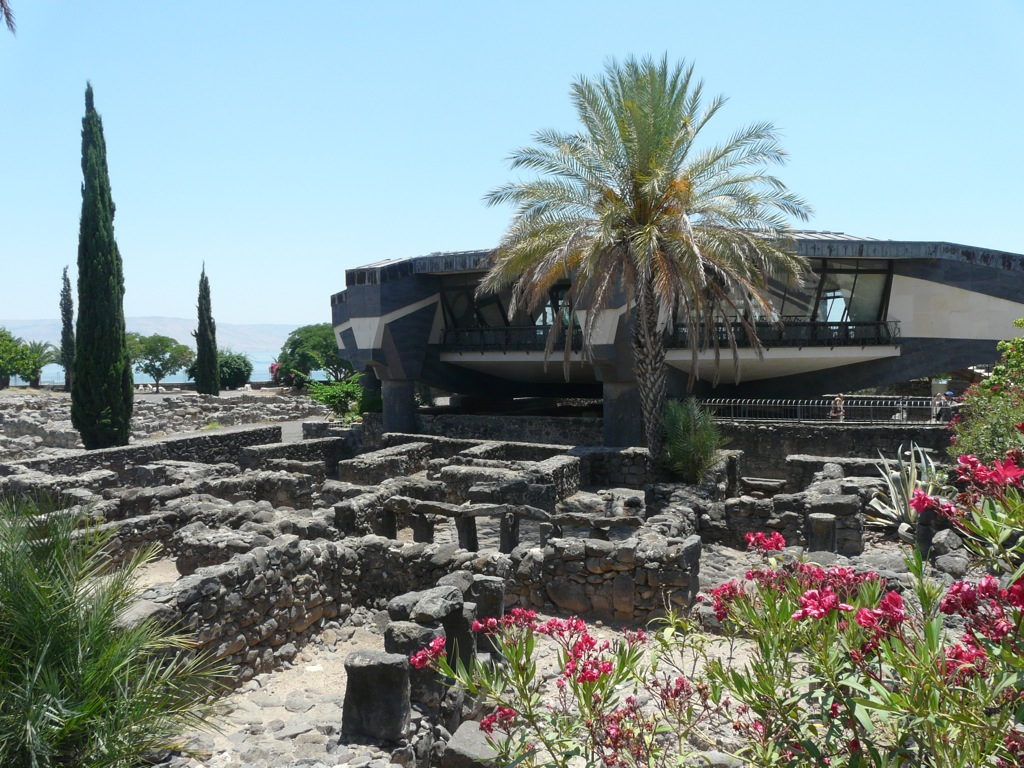
- St. Peter's Church
- Location: Capernaum
- Country: Israel
- Denomination: Roman Catholic Church

Architecture
- Architect: Ildo Avetta

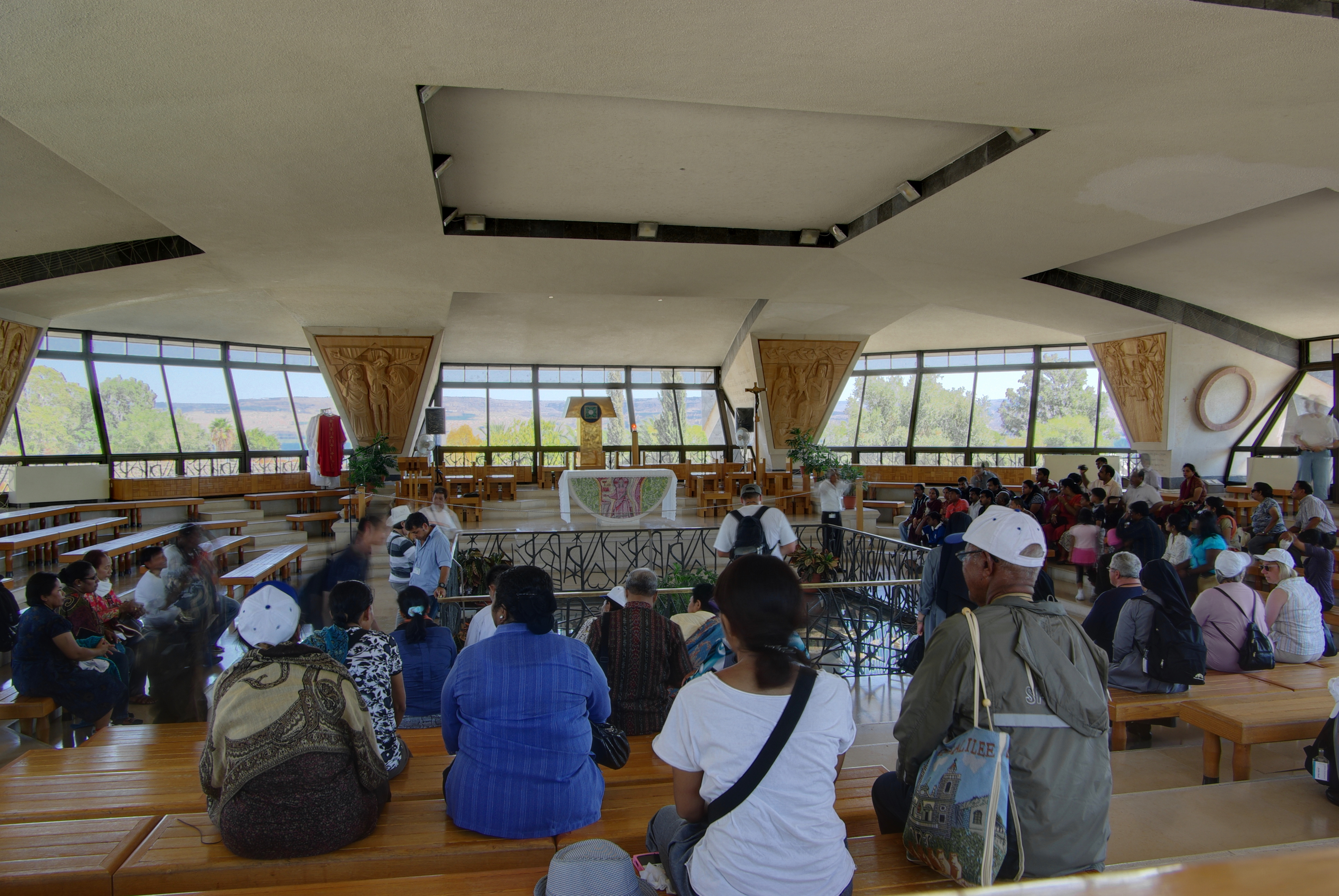
Internal view

St. Peter's Church (Hebrew: כנסיית בית פטרוס), also called the Pilgrimage Church of St. Peter in Capernaum, is a modern Catholic pilgrimage church found in the archaeological site of Capernaum, northern Israel. The church is part of the Franciscan monastery in Capernaum. It is dedicated to St. Peter, whom Catholics consider the first leader of the church.

Archaeological excavations carried out in this place discovered another layer of residential structures, on which the first half of a first century church was built. It is considered "the first church in the world" and believed it could be the place where the house of the Apostle Peter was. In the 5th century an octagonal church was built in its place. In 1990 a church of modern pilgrimage was built over the remains of the ancient temples.

The Pilgrimage Church of St. Peter is located in the central part of the archaeological site of Capernaum, at an altitude of 195 metres (640 ft) on the west coast north of the Sea of Galilee, in the depression of the Jordan Valley, in northern Israel.

The modern structure above the church's ruins was built in 1989 by T R Freeman Ltd, with a team including Martin Grant, Mick Galloni, Mick Parks, Doug Claxton and Graham Grant.

== See also ==
- Roman Catholicism in Israel
- St. Peter's Church (disambiguation)
