= Sinkor =

Area of Monrovia, Liberia

- Interactive map of Sinkor
- Coordinates: 6°18′0″N 10°46′0″W
- Country: Liberia
- County: Montserrado County
- Elevation: 95 ft (29 m)
- Time zone: UTC+0 (GMT)

Sinkor is a section of the Monrovia metropolitan area in Liberia. The United Nations Mission in Liberia (UNMIL) has its headquarters in Sinkor. Embassies, health facilities, and educational institutions, and non-governmental organizations are also in Sinkor.

Tubman Boulevard is the main thoroughfare in Sinkor, which connects the neighborhood to the Capitol Hill area and Monrovia's downtown. The neighborhood is considered to be bounded by UNMIL headquarters to the west and the Spriggs Payne airport to the east.

== Commerce ==
Sinkor is the headquarters of the Liberian Bank for Development and Infrastructure (LBDI), the Comium and Lonestar telecommunications companies, and many other businesses.

== Government ==
Sinkor is home to Liberia's National Investment Commission and National Elections Commission. The Elections Commission building was reconstructed in 2009, funded by USAID. The representative of Sinkor is Elijah Kumeh.

== History ==
Originally a suburban residential district, Sinkor grew over the 20th century into the bustling midtown section of Monrovia, eventually coming to include many diplomatic missions, major hotels, businesses, and residential neighborhoods.

=== Sinkor during the First Liberian Civil War ===
On July 29 and 30, 1990, members of the Armed Forces of Liberia murdered 600 people who sought refuge in St. Peter's Lutheran Church in Sinkor, in an effort to systematically kill suspected political opponents during the First Liberian Civil War.
