= St. Peter's Church, Akureyri =

St. Peter's Church
- St. Péturskirkja
- St. Peter's Church
- 65.677567°N 18.092298°W
- Location: Akureyri
- Country: Iceland
- Denomination: Catholic Church

St. Peter's Church (Icelandic: St. Péturskirkja) is a religious building of the Catholic Church which is located in Eyrarlandsvegi 26, in the town of Akureyri, Norduland Eystra (Northeast Region) in Iceland, and named after Saint Peter.

St. Peter's Church follows the Roman or Latin rite and is located within the Diocese of Reykjavík, the capital of Iceland. The church is noted for its red and white colors. The house was built in 1912, acquired by the diocese in 1952 and rebuilt as a church from 1998 to 2000.

Another church also dedicated to St. Peter is located nearby in Hrafnagilsstræti 2.

== See also ==
- Roman Catholicism in Iceland
- St. Peter's Church
