= St. Peter's Roman Catholic Church =

St. Peter's Roman Catholic Church may refer to:

== Ireland ==
- St. Peter's Roman Catholic Church, Drogheda

== United States ==
(alphabetical by state, then city)

- St. Peter's Roman Catholic Church-St. Mary's School, Southbridge, Massachusetts, listed on the National Register of Historic Places (NRHP)
- St. Peter's Roman Catholic Church (Echo, Oregon), NRHP-listed
- St. Peter's Roman Catholic Church (The Dalles, Oregon), NRHP-listed
- St. Peter's Roman Catholic Church (Columbia, South Carolina)
- St. Peter's Roman Catholic Church (Boerne, Texas), the subject of a 1997 U.S. Supreme Court case
- St. Peter's Roman Catholic Church (Lindsay, Texas), NRHP-listed
- St. Peter's Roman Catholic Church (Harpers Ferry, West Virginia), NRHP-listed
- St. Peter's Roman Catholic Church (Ashton, Wisconsin), NRHP-listed

== See also ==
- St. Peter's Church (disambiguation)
