= St Peter's Church, Walsall =

Anglican church in Walsall, West Midlands, England

- St Peter's Church, Walsall
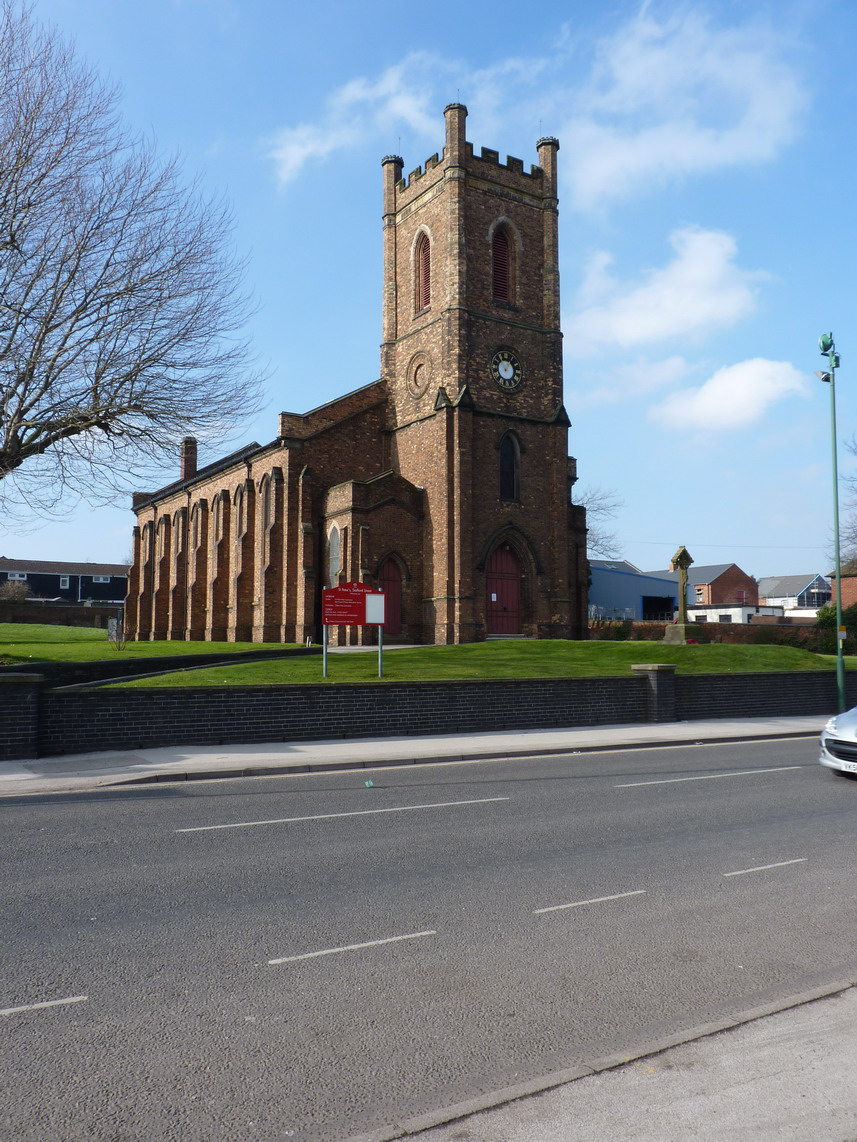
- St Peter's Church, Walsall
- St Peter's Church, Walsall
- 52.592°N 1.9860°W
- Location: Walsall, Metropolitan Borough of Walsall, West Midlands
- Country: England
- Denomination: Anglican
- Website: www.stpeterswalsall.org

History
- Dedication: St Peter

Architecture
- Functional status: Active
- Heritage designation: II
- Designated: 1986

Administration
- Province: Canterbury
- Diocese: Lichfield
- Archdeaconry: Walsall
- Parish: Walsall

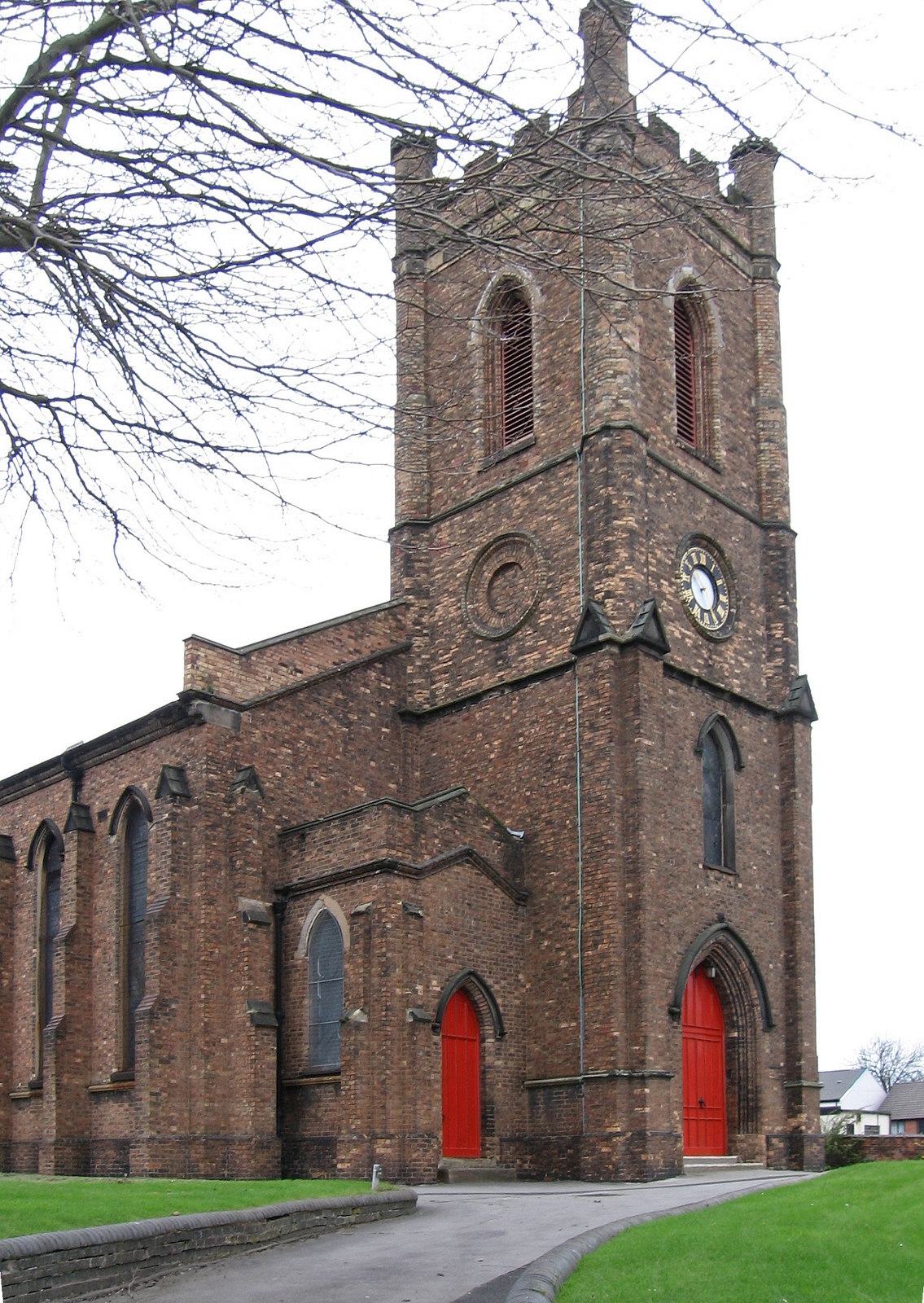
The tower of the church

St Peter's Church is an anglican church on Stafford Street in Walsall, West Midlands, England. The church is an active place of worship and serves the surrounding suburbs of Birchills, Leamore, Coalpool, Harden, Ryecroft and Beechdale. The church was listed as a grade II listed building in 1986.
