= St. Peter's-By-The-Sea Episcopal Church =

St. Peter's-By-The-Sea Episcopal Church, or variations, may refer to:

- St. Peter's by-the-Sea Episcopal Church (Sitka, Alaska)
- Saint Peter's-By-The-Sea Episcopal Church (Cape May Point, New Jersey)
- St. Peter's By-The-Sea Protestant Episcopal Church (Cape Neddick, Maine)
- St. Peter's by-the-Sea Episcopal Church in the Central Street Historic District (Narragansett, Rhode Island)
