= Mission cross =

Type of Christian cross

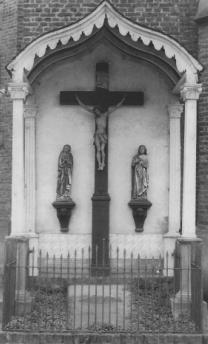
Mission cross in the parish church of Nörvenich

A mission cross (German: Missionskreuz) commemorates a "people's mission" (German: Volksmissionen) that has taken place in a parish. These were common throughout Europe prior to the 20th century, and the tradition continues. The cross is usually inscribed with the year of the mission with a common inscription like, "Save your soul!"

== Background ==
In the 17th and 18th centuries, small groups of two or three padres of the Jesuit order went from parish to parish. They often stayed for several weeks as part of a "people's mission" with the aim of "renewing the faith of the Christian people" as, for example, the 1954 statues of the Bishopric of Aachen commemorate. That was the task of the Jesuit priests even in the 18th century, albeit probably stated differently. In the following centuries, regular missions were undertaken, later also by members of other orders.

The padres held numerous events, masses and sermons - formerly delivered separately to men and married women, single adults, young people, and children - as well as times of worship, confession, house visits and other activities.

The years when the popular mission weeks were undertaken are usually shown on 20th century mission crosses.

== Bibliography ==
- Türk, Karl Heinz (2007). Das Missionskreuz an der Nörvenicher Pfarrkirche (in German). Municipality of Nörvenich.
