= St. Peter's Church, Laragh =

St. Peter's Church
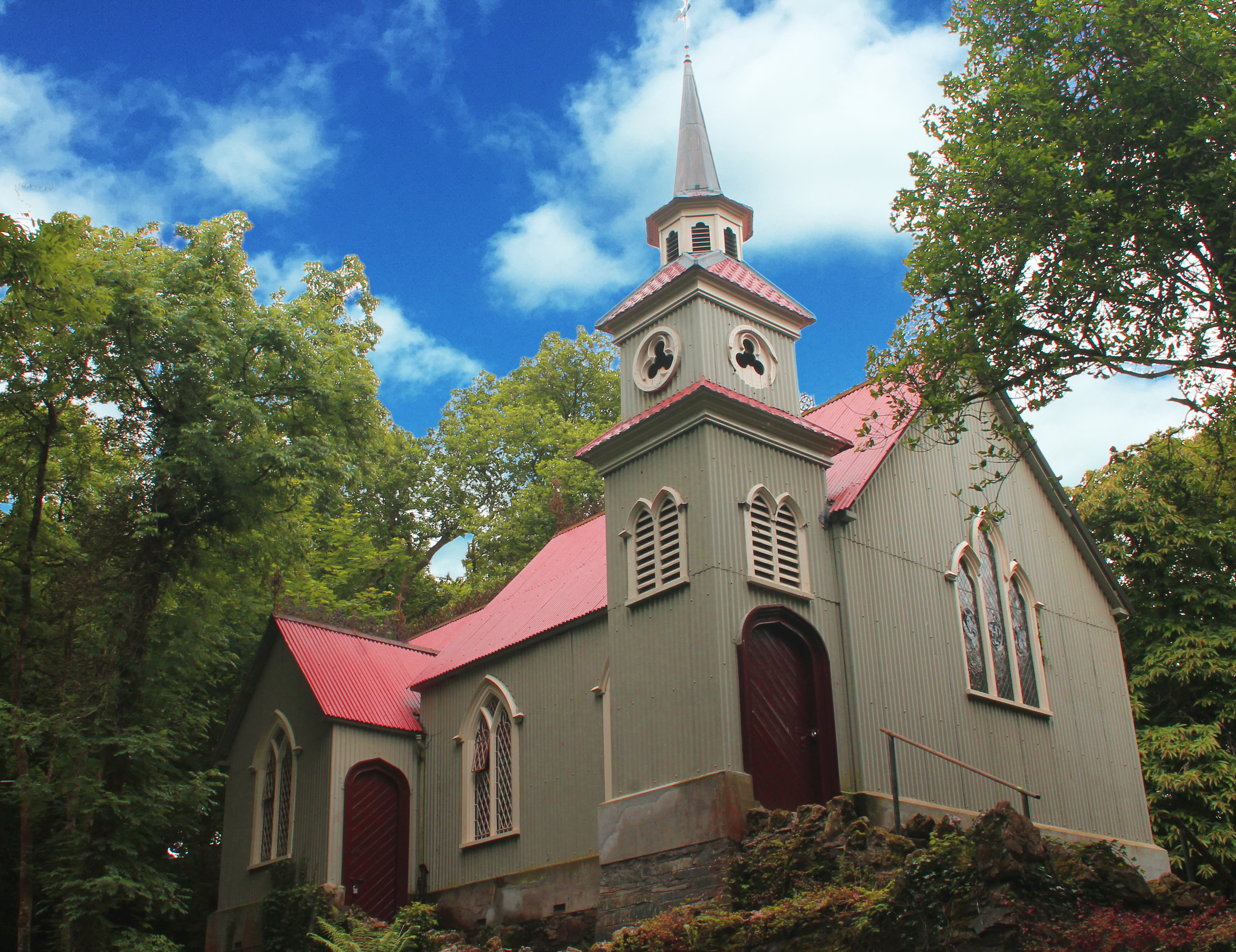
- St. Peter's Church
- St. Peter's Church
- Location: Laragh, County Monaghan
- Country: Ireland

History
- Founder: James McKean
- Dedication: St. Peter
- Consecrated: 13 August 1891

St. Peter's Church in Laragh, County Monaghan, Ireland, is a tin tabernacle constructed in 1890 from corrugated iron and timber.

== History ==
The Swiss-Gothic design of the church was inspired by travels on the continent in the 1800s by Laragh Tweed Mill operator James McKean and his wife.

Local rumour suggests McKean had the mill river realigned to create the spectacular site in Aughnamullen parish, the intention being to build a Catholic church to serve the mill workers of the town. However, following a breakdown in industrial relations, a falling out with the local clergy and the eventual permanent closure of the Irish Laragh Tweed factory in 1885, St. Peter's was eventually built in 1890 and consecrated as Church of Ireland on 13 August 1891.

St. Peter's was de-consecrated in 1962.

== Restoration ==
In 2012, Laragh Heritage group was formed to raise funds to restore St. Peter's back to its former glory.

On 13 September 2014, St. Peter's Church was officially reopened.

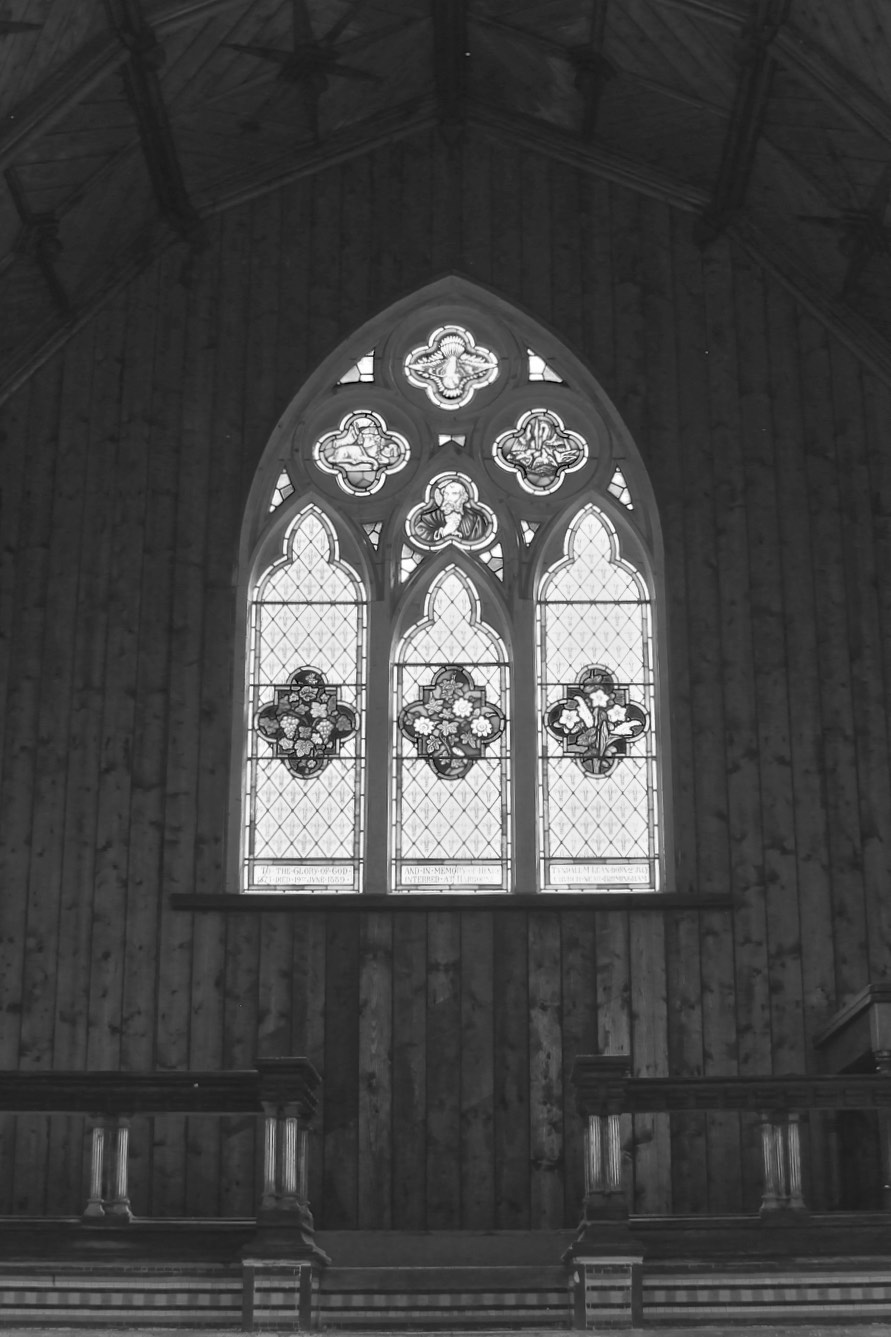
An interior view of the altar and stained glass window
