= St Mary and St Peter's Church =

St Mary and St Peter's Church and variations, including those "with" rather than "and", may refer to:

- St Mary and St Peter's Church, Barham, Suffolk, England
- St Mary and St Peter's Church, Harlaxton, Lincolnshire, England
- Church of St Mary with St Peter, Ludford, Lincolnshire, England
- Church of St Mary with St Peter, Oldham, Greater Manchester, England
- Church of St Peter and St Mary, Stowmarket, Suffolk, England
- Church of St Mary and St Peter, Tidenham, Gloucestershire, England
- Church of St Mary and St Peter, Waddingham, Lincolnshire, England
- St Mary and St Peter's Church, Wennington, London, England
- St Mary and St Peter's Church, Wilmington, East Sussex, England
- Church of St Mary and St Peter, Winford, Somerset, England

== See also ==
- St. Peter's Roman Catholic Church-St. Mary's School, Southbridge, Massachusetts
