= St. Peter's Church (Kansas City, Missouri) =

Church in Brookside, Kansas City, Missouri, United States

Coordinates: 39°0′41″N 94°34′44″W

St. Peter's Catholic Parish of the Roman Catholic Church was founded in 1925 by Catholic families in the then suburb of Brookside, Kansas City. The community has a K-8 school.

== History ==
The church was founded by James McKay in 1925 for the families of Brookside. Later in the 90's, a new part of the building was dubbed "The McKay Center" which contains a gymnasium, office, several classrooms, a cafeteria and a basement. Most people attending the parish were of Irish descent. The church grew quickly and in 1929 the school was founded for the families. Today the church and school are still thriving and in 2017 a major renovation was made to the building.

== Education Details ==
The education at St. Peters contains six main subjects: language arts, literature, science, math, social studies, and religion. Other subjects include: physical education, computer, art, Spanish, music, and several elective classes for grades 7 and 8.

== Notable alumni ==
Bill O'Connor (basketball)
