= St. Peter's Cemetery =

St. Peter's Cemetery may refer to:

- St. Peter's Cemetery (Halifax), Nova Scotia
- St. Peter's Cemetery (Jefferson County, Arkansas), on the National Register of Historic Places
- Saint Peter's Cemetery (Jersey City, New Jersey)
- St. Peter's Cemetery (Lewiston, Maine)
- St. Peter's Cemetery (Baltimore, Maryland), home to Jonah House
- St. Peter's Cemetery (Staten Island), New York
- Petersfriedhof Salzburg, Austria
- St. Peter's Cemetery in the Wajee Nature Park, Baden-Powell grave
