= St. Peter's Evangelical Lutheran Church (Versailles, Ohio) =

Historic church in Ohio, United States

- St. Peter Evangelical Lutheran Church
- U.S. National Register of Historic Places
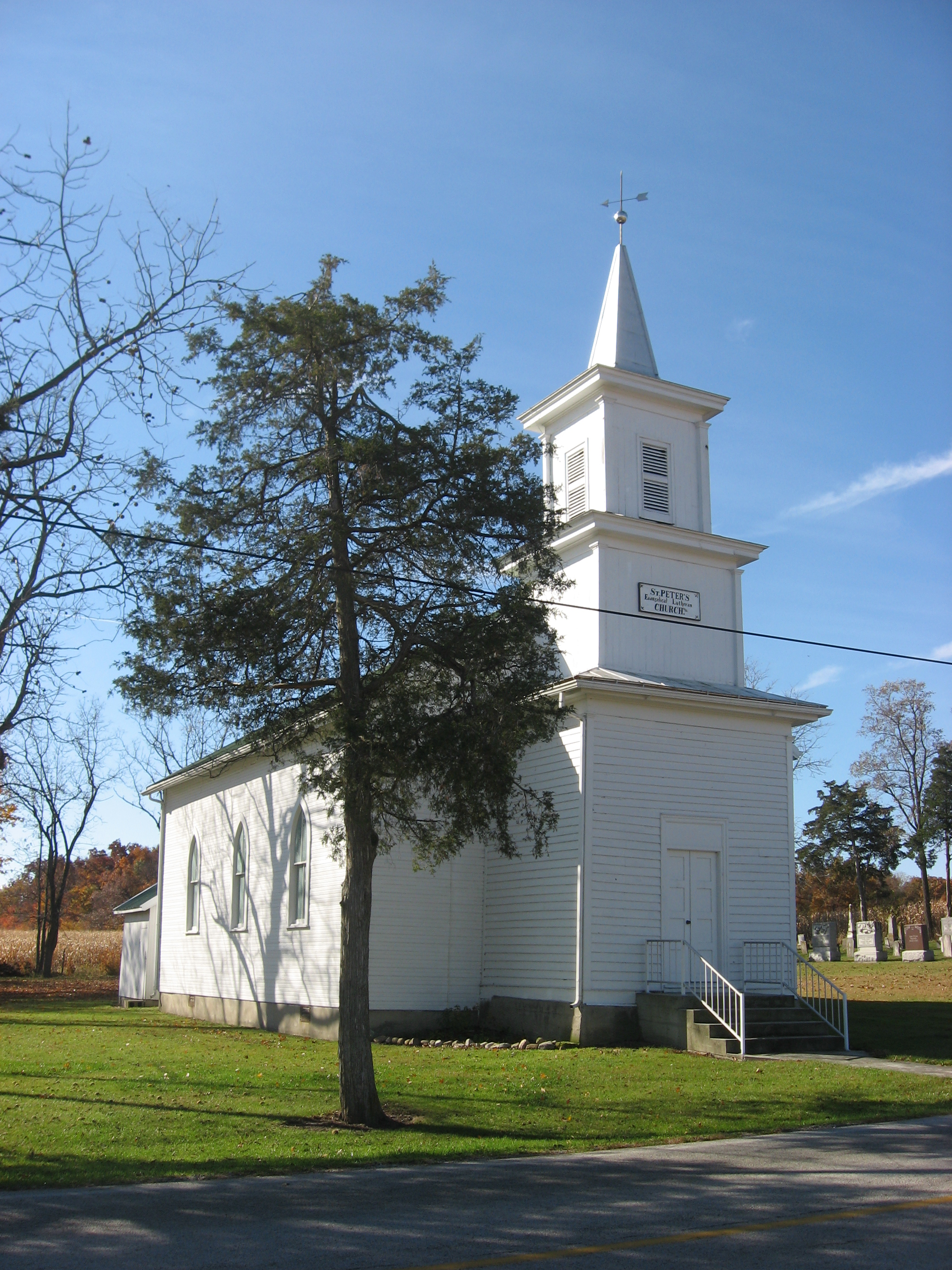
- Front and eastern side of the church

- Location within Ohio Location within the United States
- Location: St. Peter Rd., southeast of Versailles, Ohio
- Coordinates: 40°11′45″N 84°27′53″W
- Area: Less than 1 acre (0.40 ha)
- Built: 1850
- NRHP reference No.: 80002988
- Added to NRHP: June 4, 1980

St. Peter's Evangelical Lutheran Church is a historic church building in northeastern Darke County, Ohio, United States. Located south of the village of Versailles, it is believed to be the region's last remaining log church built during the period of settlement. Although Wayne Township was settled primarily by individuals of English and French descent, the members of St. Peter's Church were Germans. The church was built in 1850 by its members upon land donated by Frederick Frengott Seibt; the congregation erected their church on the lower portion of this ground and plotted their cemetery on the upper portion. Since that time, the structure has been modified little; the only significant change has been the addition of a small belfry in 1867. Inside, the church retains a high degree of historic integrity: still in place are the wood-burning stove, the reed organ, the hand-carven pulpit, and the original sandblasted windows.

In 1980, St. Peter's Church was listed on the National Register of Historic Places, both because of its well-preserved historic architecture and because of its place in the settlement of the region. It is one of four churches in Darke County that are listed on the National Register, and the only one that is not Catholic.

== See also ==
- St. John's Catholic Church (Fryburg, Ohio), a similar Catholic church to the northeast
