= St. Peter's Episcopal Church (Norfolk, Virginia) =

Historic church in Virginia, United States

- U.S. National Register of Historic Places
- Virginia Landmarks Register
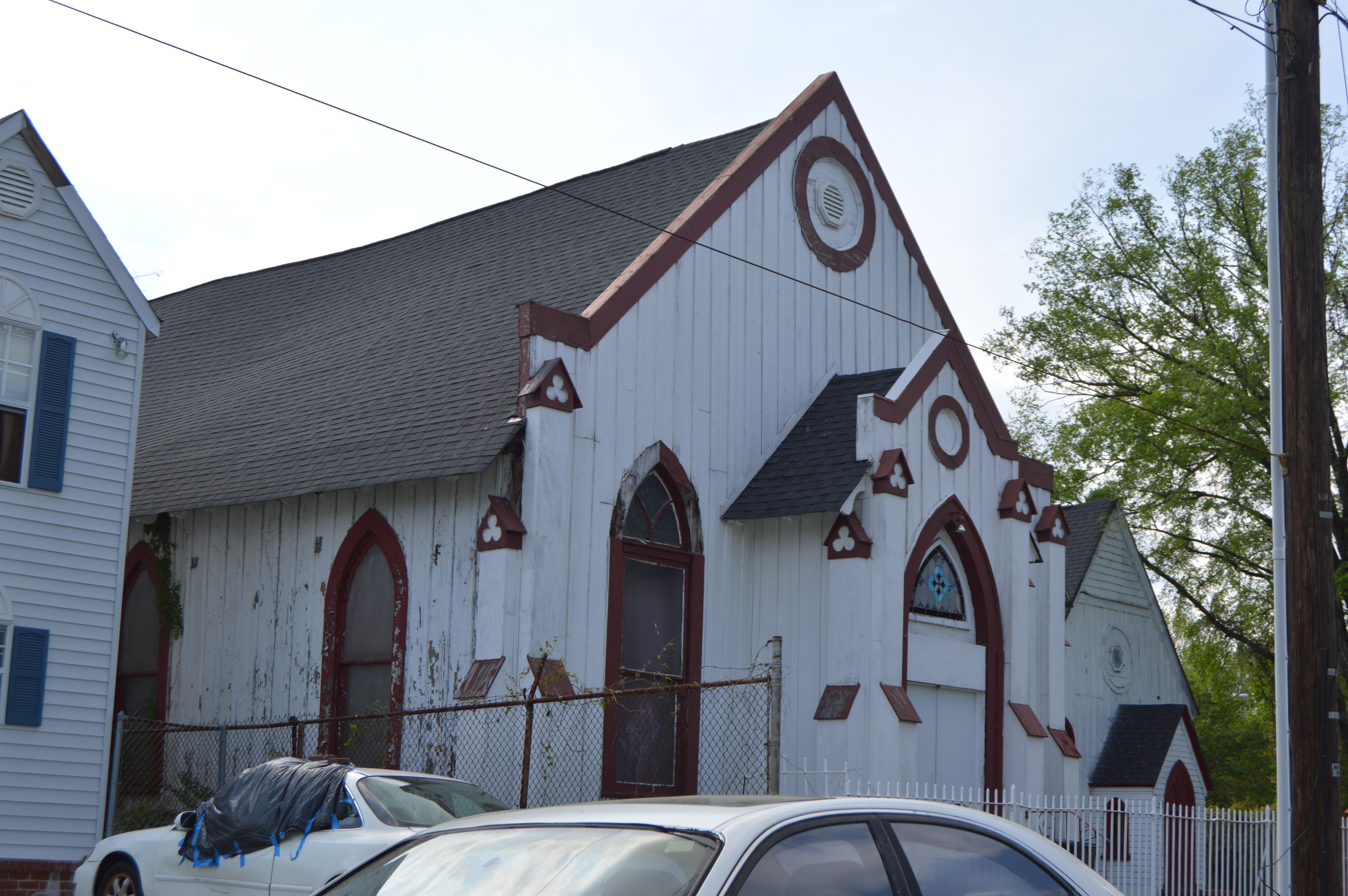
- Front of the main section

- Location within Virginia Location within the United States
- Location: 1625 Brown Ave., Norfolk, Virginia
- Coordinates: 36°50′38″N 76°16′24″W
- Area: Less than 1 acre (0.40 ha)
- Built: 1886, 1887, 1912
- Architectural style: Carpenter Gothic
- NRHP reference No.: 10000445
- VLR No.: 122-0047

Significant dates
- Added to NRHP: July 8, 2010
- Designated VLR: March 18, 2010

St. Peter's Episcopal Church, now known as The New Saint James Holiness Church of Christ Disciples, is a historic Episcopal church in Norfolk, Virginia, United States. It is a frame, gable-roofed building with two contiguous sections: 1) the sanctuary built in 1886; 2) and the fellowship hall (originally called the "parish house") built in 1912. The church building is in the Gothic Revival style. The building features a small gable-roofed arched entrance door and large and small arched stained-glass windows. St. Peter's is one of six mission churches that descended from St. Paul's. St. Peter's Episcopal Church operated at this location until 1959, when it was transferred to the African-American trustees of Garretts Independent Community Church. In 1967, St. Peter's was transferred to the trustees of what come to be known as Saint James Holiness Church of Christ Disciples.

It was listed on the National Register of Historic Places in 2010.
