= St. Peter's Catholic Church (Canton, Ohio) =

Historic church in Ohio, United States

- St. Peter Church
- U.S. National Register of Historic Places
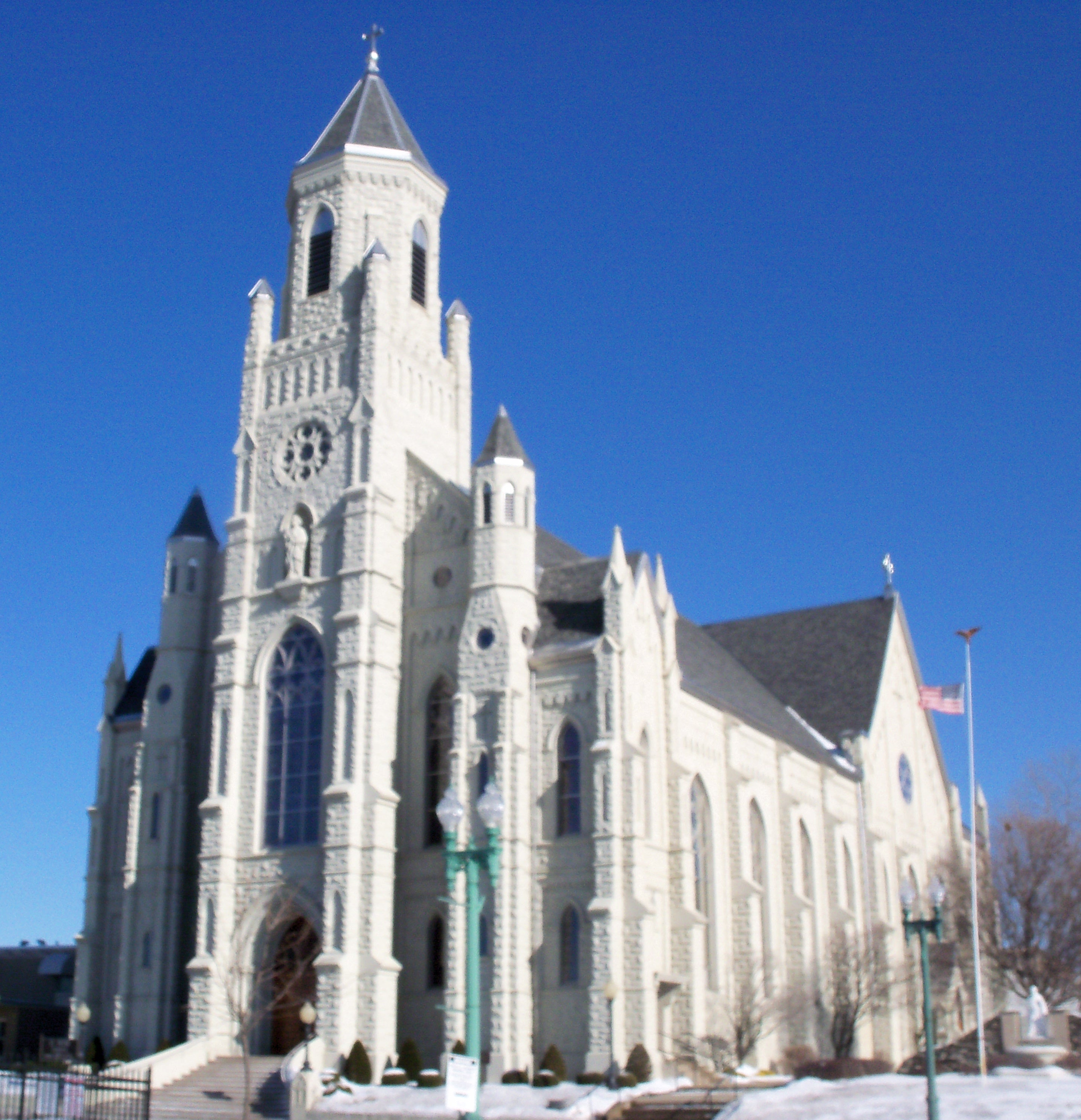

- Location within Ohio Location within the United States
- Location: 720 Cleveland Ave., NW., Canton, Ohio
- Coordinates: 40°48′14″N 81°22′29″W
- Area: less than one acre
- Built: 1875
- Architectural style: Gothic Revival
- NRHP reference No.: 90000472
- Added to NRHP: March 22, 1990

St. Peter Church is a historic church at 720 Cleveland Ave., NW in Canton, Ohio.

It was built in 1875 and added to the National Register in 1990.
