= St. Peter's Lutheran Church (Kinde, Michigan) =

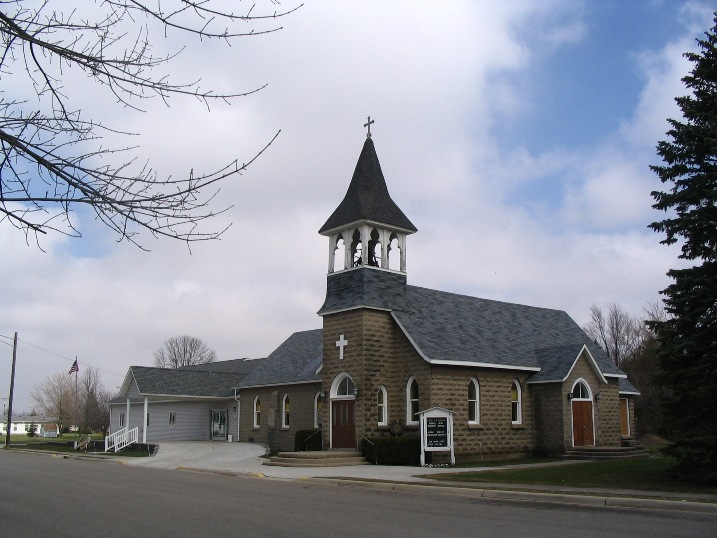
- St. Peter's Lutheran Church

- Location within Michigan Location within the United States
- 43.9416°N 82.997°W
- Location: Kinde, Michigan
- Country: United States
- Denomination: Lutheran Church–Missouri Synod

History
- Former name: German Evangelical Lutheran St. Peters Church of Port Crescent
- Status: Parish church
- Founded: 1873

Architecture
- Functional status: Active
- Years built: 1885

Administration
- District: Michigan District

Clergy
- Pastor: Larry K. Loree Sr.

St. Peter’s Lutheran Church is a church located in Kinde, Michigan. It is a member of the Michigan District of the Lutheran Church – Missouri Synod.

== History ==
The church has its roots in the ghost town of Port Crescent, Michigan. In 1844, Rev. W. Swartz of Ruth, Michigan, organized the area Lutherans and ultimately founded the church under the name of The German Evangelical Lutheran St. Peter's Church of Port Crescent in 1873. Services were held in private homes. In 1893, the congregation, under Rev. E. Berner, purchased the All Saints Episcopalian Church, which had been built in 1885.

In 1901, Albert Iseler donated an acre of land to Zion Church.

In 1907, the businessmen of Kinde, Michigan, offered the congregation $130 and a plot of land to relocate to their town. The congregation accepted and the church building was moved from Port Crescent. Since then the church has been served by many pastors and joined with Zion Lutheran Church in 1950.

In 1945 the congregation purchased the building of a former Methodist church located about 600 feet (180 m) south for use as a social hall. A 2,500-square-foot (230 m^{2}) addition to the church itself was completed in 1954.

The addition of a hall was completed in 2005. The $200,000, 3,500-square-foot (330 m^{2}) structure contains offices and meeting areas, allowing the congregation to sell the former Methodist church building.

In 2010, the church served as a scene in the movie This Must be the Place starring Sean Penn.

== Present ==
As of 2026, St. Peter's Lutheran Church has 82 baptized members with 39 congregants on an average Sunday.
