= St Peter's Lutheran Church, Hobart =

Church in Hobart, Tasmania, Australia

Coordinates: 42.872°S 147.317°E

- St Peter's Lutheran Church, Hobart
- Denomination: Lutheran
- Website: www.splchobart.org

Clergy
- Bishop: Pr Lester Priebbenow
- Pastor: Peter Noble

St Peter's Lutheran Church (SPLC) is located in Warrane, Tasmania. The church's denomination is Lutheran and has approximately 140 members. The Lutheran school associated with St Peter's Church was moved to Warrane in 1982. The church followed a number of years later. In addition to worship services and the church's related religious education and fellowship program, the church has multiple events throughout the year such as the Easter breakfast on Mt Wellington and a Christmas pageant. SPLC is a part of the Victorian-Tasmanian district of the Lutheran Church of Australia.

== History ==
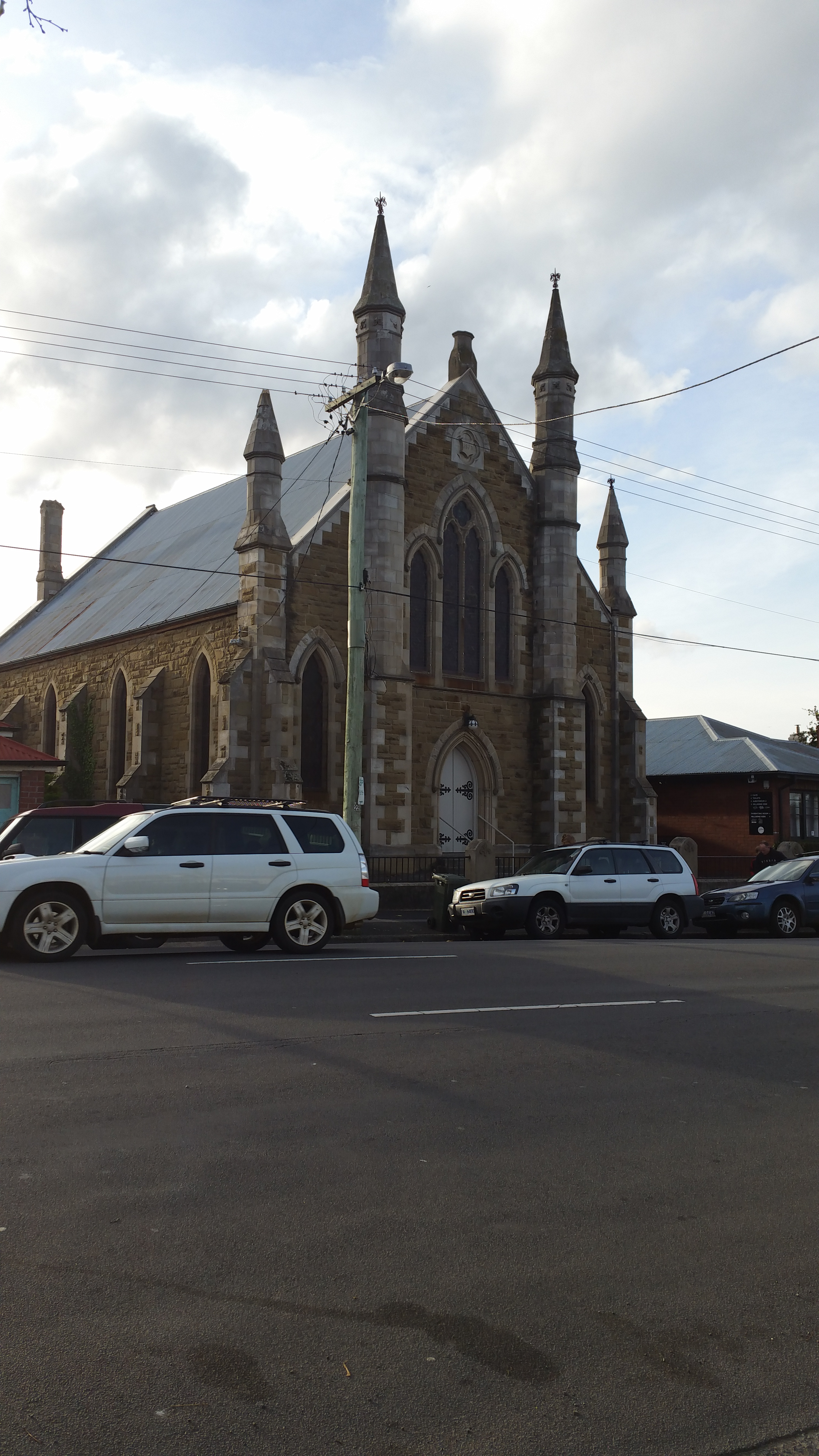
The original SPLC church on Davey street.

SPLC was established as an Australian Lutheran congregation in 1949. Many founding and early members were post-war migrants. SPLC bought a Methodist church on Davey Street, Hobart. The church was bought for $55,000 in 1973. The church was built by the architectures Crouch and Wilson of Melbourne in 1871. The church later moved to Warrane due to the weak and old structure of the sandstone and bricks. The Davey Street church is now owned by Hillsong.

== Activities ==
The church has numerous activities that reach out to the community. These include:

- Bible Studies
- Band Led Services
- Choir
- Prayer Group
- Quiz Nights
- Craft Mornings
- Church Concert

SPLC also has an Easter Sunday dawn service on Mount Wellington's summit and also has a Christmas festival later in the year.

== Beliefs ==
SPLC has traditional Lutheran beliefs. These include the Trinity (Father, Son, and Holy Spirit), the belief that Jesus Christ died for the forgiveness of sins, following the Bibles teachings and the sacraments (Baptism, Holy Communion, etc.).

== Affiliations ==
SPLC is affiliated with its Lutheran school Eastside Lutheran College. In the church on Friday afternoons, the chapel service is led by Pastor Mike Steicke. SPLC also works close with its northern Tasmania parish. The two pastors. have pulpit exchanges throughout the year.
