= St. Peter's Evangelical Lutheran Church (Lancaster, Ohio) =

Historic church in Ohio, United States

- U.S. National Register of Historic Places
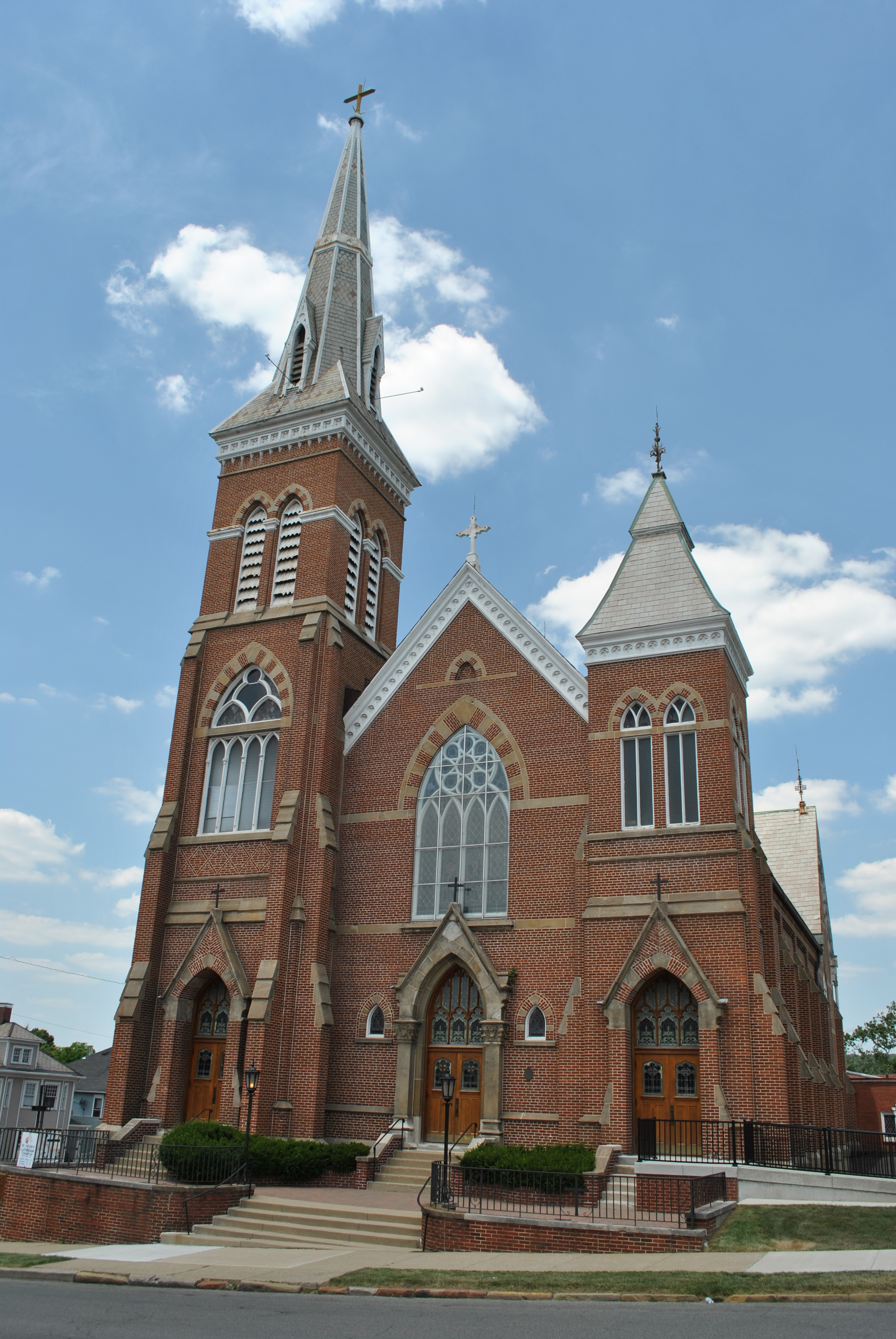

- Location within Ohio Location within the United States
- Location: Broad and Mullberry Sts., Lancaster, Ohio
- Coordinates: 39°42′59″N 82°36′6″W
- Area: less than one acre
- Built: 1879
- Architectural style: Gothic Revival
- NRHP reference No.: 79001831
- Added to NRHP: April 16, 1979

St. Peter's Evangelical Lutheran Church is a historic Lutheran church at Broad and Mullberry Streets in Lancaster, Ohio.

It was built in 1879 and added to the National Register of Historic Places in 1979.
