= St. Peter's Episcopal Church (Sheridan, Wyoming) =

- U.S. National Register of Historic Places
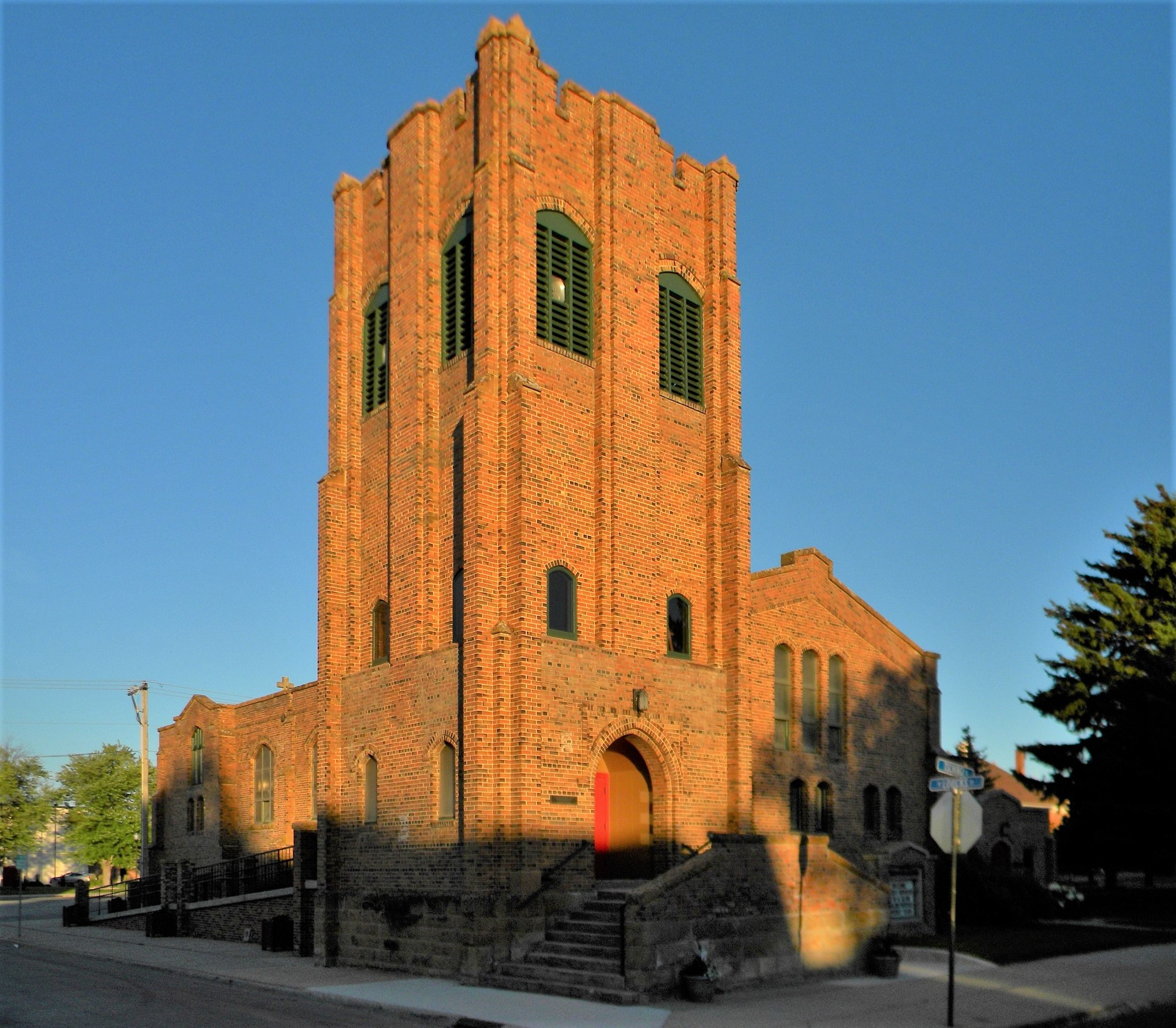

- Location within Wyoming Location within the United States
- Location: 1 South Tschirgi Street, Sheridan, Wyoming
- Coordinates: 44°47′49.5″N 106°57′29″W
- Built: 1912
- Architectural style: Gothic Revival
- NRHP reference No.: 13000266
- Added to NRHP: May 21, 2013

St Peter's Episcopal Church is a brick Gothic Revival style church built in 1912 in Sheridan, Wyoming. It was listed on the National Register of Historic Places in 2013.

It was designed by architect Edward E. Hendrickson of Frank Miles Day firm in Philadelphia. It has brick walls upon a concrete and sandstone foundation. It is about 37 by 100 feet (11 m × 30 m) in plan and rises 25 feet (7.6 m), but with a 75 feet (23 m) tower.
