= Monrovia Church massacre =

1990 attack of the First Liberian Civil War

- Part of the First Liberian Civil War
- Monrovia Church massacre (Liberia)
- Location: 06°17′30″N 10°46′48″W; Sinkor, Monrovia, Liberia
- Date: 29 July 1990
- Target: Civilian population
- Attack type: Massacre
- Weapons: Machine guns, machetes
- Deaths: ~600
- Injuries: 150
- Perpetrator: Armed Forces of Liberia
- No. of participants: 30-200
- Motive: Genocidal massacre

The Monrovia Church massacre, also referred to as the St. Peter's Lutheran Church massacre, was the worst single atrocity of the First Liberian Civil War. Approximately 600 people were killed at the church, on 14th Street, in the Sinkor district of Monrovia on 29 July 1990. The massacre was carried out by approximately 30 government soldiers loyal to President Samuel Doe. The perpetrators were of Doe's Krahn tribe while most of the victims were from the Gio and Mano tribes, which were in support of the rebels.

== Background ==
The First Liberian Civil War lasted from 1989 until 1997. By mid-1990, two rival factions of rebel fighters advanced on the Liberian capital Monrovia and President Samuel Doe was hiding out in his executive mansion near the seaside.

At night, government soldiers patrolled the streets of those parts of Monrovia still under government control in search for people from Nimba County, the area the rebellion had started in, beating and killing men and engaging in looting. In search for safety, approximately 2,000 people had taken refuge in the St. Peter's Lutheran Church.

== Massacre ==
Approximately 30 government soldiers (possibly as many as 200 according to a survivor of the attack) climbed over the wall of the church yard on the night of 29 July and carried out the massacre, shooting and hacking to death men, women and children, regardless of age. Of those targeted, only a small number of children survived, hiding under the bodies of adults. The perpetrators of the massacre were from Samuel Doe's Krahn tribe, while most of the victims were from the Gio and Mano tribes, which supported the rebels. Early the next morning, the perpetrators returned, killing one survivor before leaving again.

An American missionary, Bette McCrandall, listened to the attack from a church compound nearby.

== Aftermath ==
Among the first people arriving at the scene of the massacre the following day was a doctor from Guinea who discovered, as the only sign of life, a crying baby. She had to walk over the dead bodies to reach the child and, after picking it up, saw other small children rise from their hiding places.

The reported leader of the death squad that carried out the massacre, Michael Tilly, later visited the hospital where survivors were being treated and threatened to execute them, as his troops had done at the John F. Kennedy Medical Center a week prior.

The massacre, the worst single atrocity of the First Liberian Civil War, resulted in neighbouring countries sending an armed intervention force, under the leadership of the Economic Community of West African States.

While the Liberian embassy in Washington denied involvement of government soldiers in the massacre, the US government confirmed their involvement and initially estimated the number of victims as between 200 and 300.

One of the two rival rebel leaders, Prince Johnson, the other being Charles Taylor, requested that the United States intervene, but it declined to send in the 2,000 Marines stationed off shore. The US deployed Marines in August 1990 as part of Operation Sharp Edge, but only to protect and evacuate American citizens.

United Nations Secretary General Javier Pérez de Cuéllar stated he was horrified by the massacre and requested the protection of civilians in the country.

Former Armed Forces of Liberia officer Boi Bleeju Boi stated in 2008 that he was convinced that the massacre was carried out by government soldiers as it would have been impossible for any rebel force to enter the area, carry out the massacre and retreat without notice of the Army. He also believed that the lack of investigation of the massacre by the Army pointed towards its involvement.

St. Peter's Lutheran Church was rebuilt at the cost of US$1 million (~$2.01 million in 2025) and re-consecrated in August 1993.

== Prosecution ==
The decades after the massacre saw no attempt at holding anybody accountable. In 2017 four survivors of the massacre sued a former colonel of the Liberian Special Anti-Terrorist Unit, Moses Thomas, who now lived in Pennsylvania. He denies all involvement of himself or his unit in the massacre. Campaigners hope that winning the civil suit will cause his temporary protected status in the United States to be revoked, and could possibly cause him to be deported to Liberia where, as of 2018, nobody has been tried for the massacres committed during the civil war.
