= St. Peter's Episcopal Church (McKinney, Texas) =

Church in the United States

Coordinates: 33.200765°N 96.620699°W

St. Peter's Episcopal Church is located in McKinney, Texas, approximately 30 miles north of Dallas.

In 2016, the church reported 509 members; in 2023, it reported 680 members. No membership statistics were reported in 2024 national parochial reports. Plate and pledge financial support reported by the church in 2024 was $836,879. Average Sunday Attendance ASA reported in 2024 was 270 persons. This was a relative decrease on ASA of 325 in 2020.

The interim Rector is the Rev. Kathy Heitmann.

== History ==
The church was designated a mission church in 1876, when services were held in private homes and offices. In 1890 the mission was elevated to the status of a parish, and in 1893 the original frame church was completed, on the site of the present church. A new sanctuary was built in 1926. In 1947, the church's women's guild sold mail order fruitcakes that raised money for the church.

In 1960 a fire destroyed the sanctuary and other valuables, and the current church building was built the next year, and extended in 1997.

== See also ==
- Episcopal Diocese of Dallas
