= Basilica of St. Peter (Columbia, South Carolina) =

Historic church in South Carolina, United States

Coordinates: 34°0′20″N 81°2′16″W

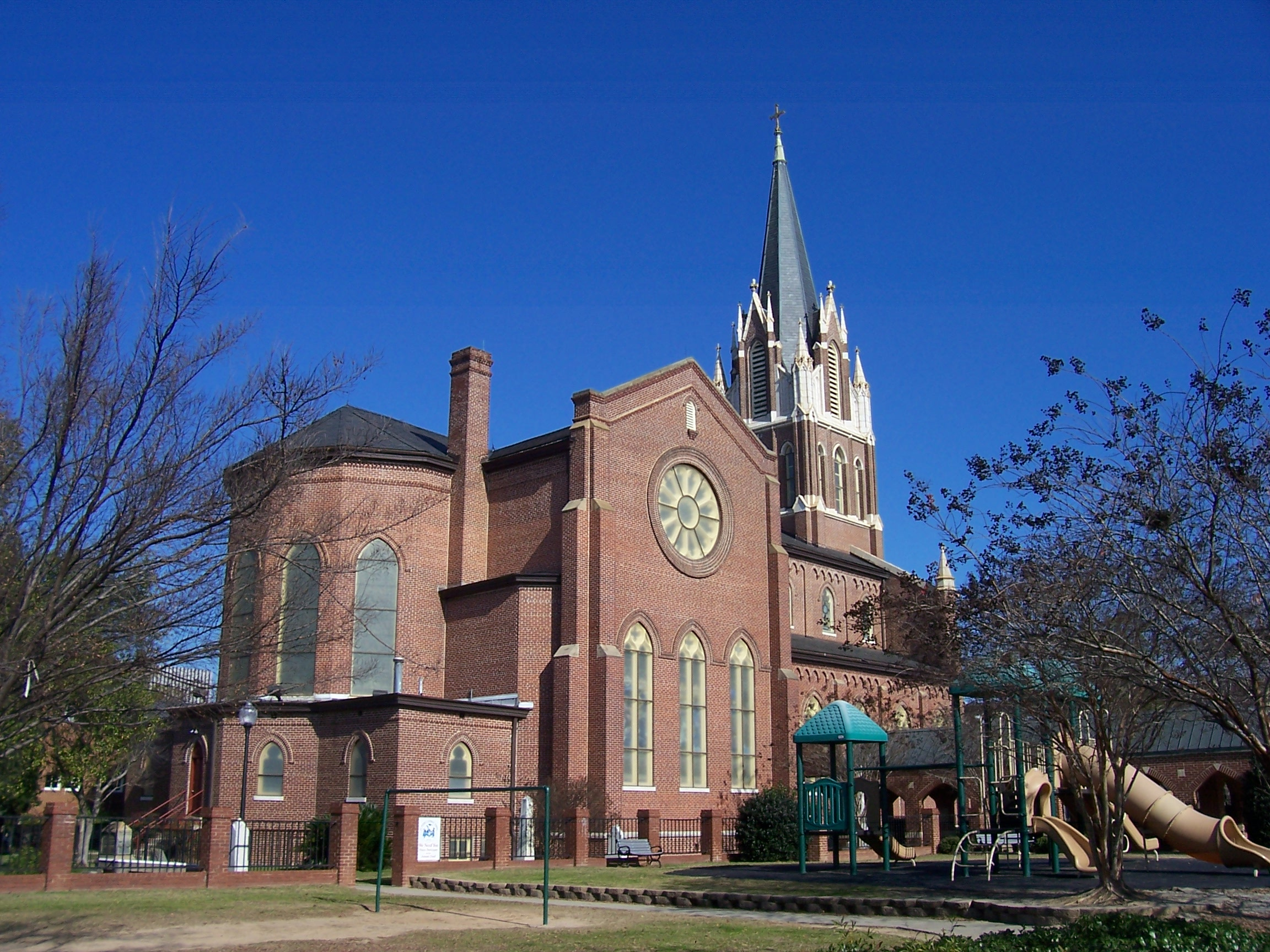
- The Basilica of St. Peter in 2009
- Basilica of St. Peter
- Location: 1529 Assembly Street; Columbia, South Carolina
- Country: United States
- Denomination: Roman Catholic
- Website: www.visitstpeters.org

History
- Status: Basilica

Architecture
- Functional status: Active
- Heritage designation: NRHP
- Designated: 1989
- Architect: Frank Pierce Milburn
- Style: Gothic Revival
- Groundbreaking: July 19, 1874

Specifications
- Length: 131 ft (40 m)
- Width: 79 ft (24 m)
- Materials: Dark red brick with Bedford stone and terra cotta trim

Administration
- Archdiocese: Diocese of Charleston

Clergy
- Rector: The Very Rev'd Canon Gary S. Linsky
- Saint Peter's Roman Catholic Church
- U.S. National Register of Historic Places
- Location: 1529 Assembly Street; Columbia, South Carolina
- Built: 1908
- Architect: Frank Pierce Milburn
- Architectural style: Gothic
- NRHP reference No.: 89001610
- Added to NRHP: September 28, 1989

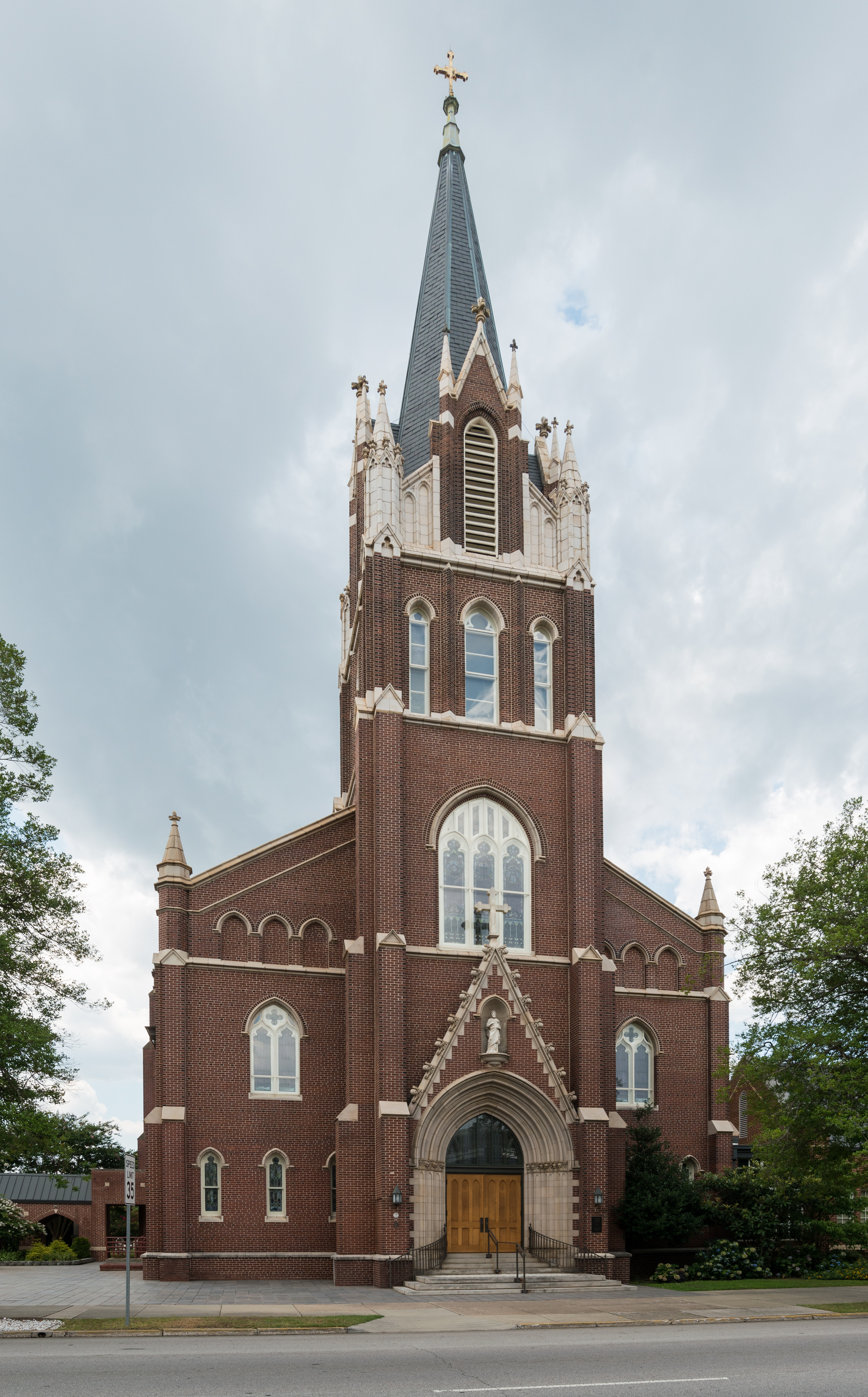
An east view of the basilica

The Basilica of St. Peter, also known as St. Peter's Roman Catholic Church, is located at 1529 Assembly St. in Columbia, South Carolina. This is the second building of the oldest Catholic parish in Columbia and the Midlands of South Carolina. On June 24, 2018, it was announced that the Vatican's Congregation for Divine Worship and the Discipline of the Sacraments issued a decree granting Saint Peter's Catholic Church in Columbia the title ‘Minor Basilica.’ This makes the church the first basilica in South Carolina.

The St. Peter's Church was listed the National Register of Historic Places in 1989.

The first resident Catholic priest came to Columbia in 1820. St. Peter's first church, designed by the South Carolina architect Robert Mills, was completed in 1824. This church was demolished in the early 1900s to build the new sanctuary.

The new church was designed by Frank Pierce Milburn, a Southern architect. The planning and fundraising was done largely by Father Thomas J. Hegarty. Construction started in 1906 and was completed in 1908. The dedication was in January 1909.

The Gothic Revival church was built with dark red brick with Bedford limestone and dull glazed terra cotta trim. The roof was Buckingham Slate. The spire is topped with a cross and is 163 ft (49.7 m) above grade.

The church has a cruciform plan with a high nave. It is 131 ft (40 m) long and 79 ft (24.1 m) wide. The nave is 64 ft (19.5 m) long and 51 ft (15.6 m) tall. The 3,500 lb (1,591 kg), 55 in (1.4 m) diameter bell was cast in 1911 by McShane Bell Foundry in Baltimore, Maryland.

The church graveyard is to the rear of the church.
