= St. Peter's Church, Straubing =

Coordinates: 48°53′10.50″N 12°35′17.93″E

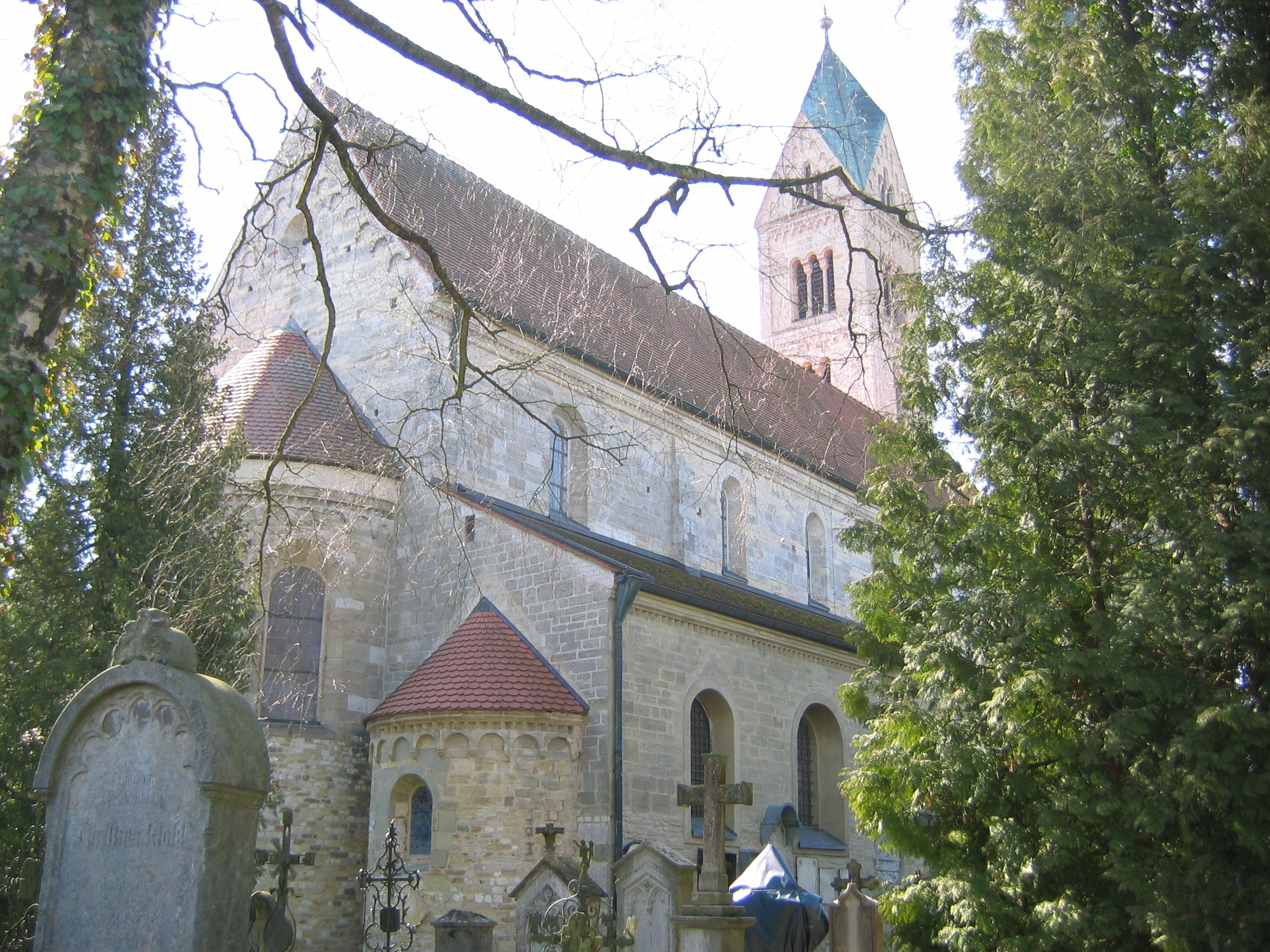
St. Peter's Church, Straubing, from the north east

St. Peter's Church, Straubing, is a Romanesque basilica in Straubing, Germany. It was built in the second half of the 12th century, and is distinguished by its two sculpted portals. The surrounding graveyard contains a number of funeral chapels, most notably the Totenkapelle, which is decorated with a cycle of paintings depicting the Totentanz (Dance of the Dead) by the Rococo artist Felix Hözl.

== Location ==
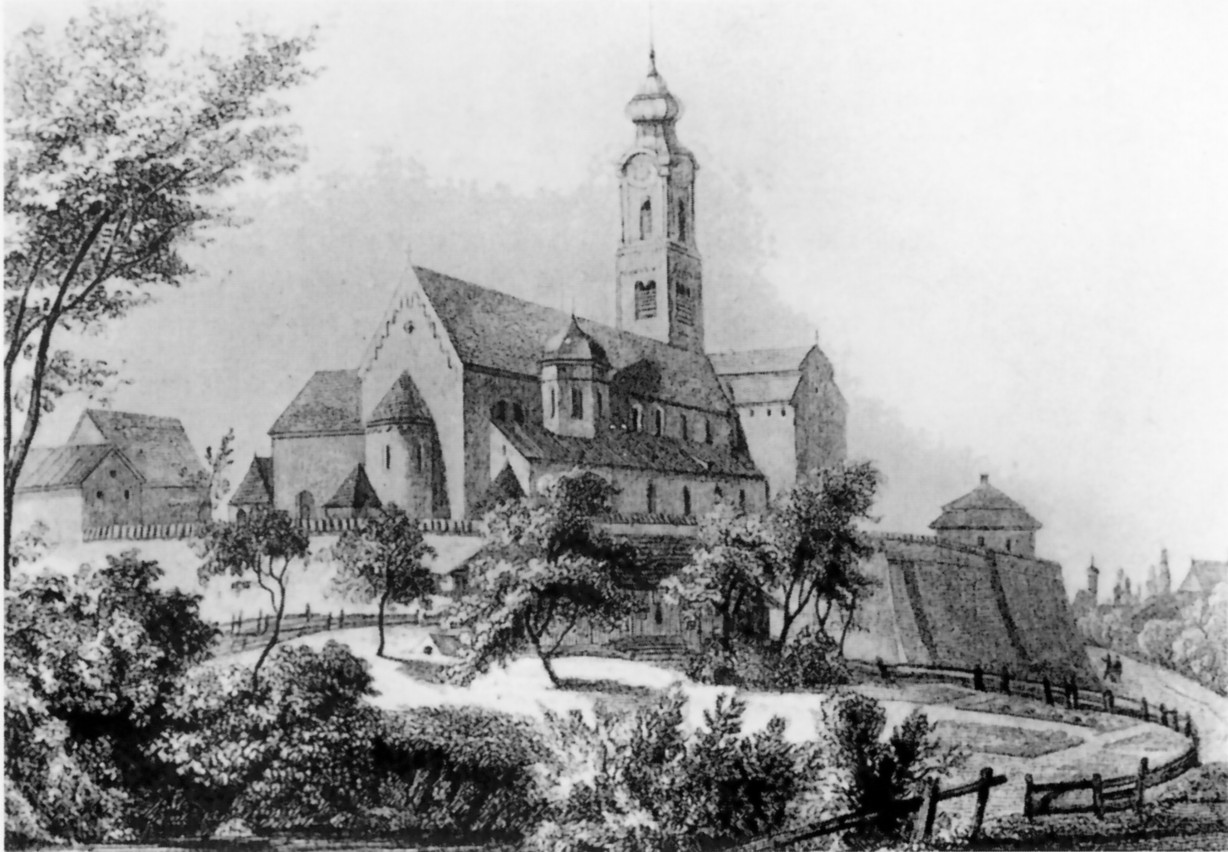
View of St. Peter's, c. 1860

St. Peter's is located on the southern bank of the Danube river in the Altstadt of Straubing, approximately one kilometer to the east of the present city center. It sits on top of a small elevation, and the graveyard, church, and chapels are enclosed by a wall.

== History ==
The present church is at least the second to have stood on the site: excavations conducted in 1974 revealed the presence of an earlier Carolingian hall church. The present church was built around 1200, shortly before the removal of Straubing's main market to a site well to the west (the present-day Neustadt). St. Peter's remained, however, the only rectory in Straubing until 1492, when the Church of St. Jakob was built in the Neustadt. The church was redecorated in a Baroque style sometime before 1696, and an onion-dome was set atop the south-western tower. The Baroque decoration and onion dome were removed in 1866/67 in the course of a historicizing "purification" of the structure. In 1885 the north-western tower, which had previously been only three storeys high, was raised to the height of the south-western tower. The most recent restoration was undertaken in 1977/78, at which time the nave was provided with a wooden roof.

== Structure ==
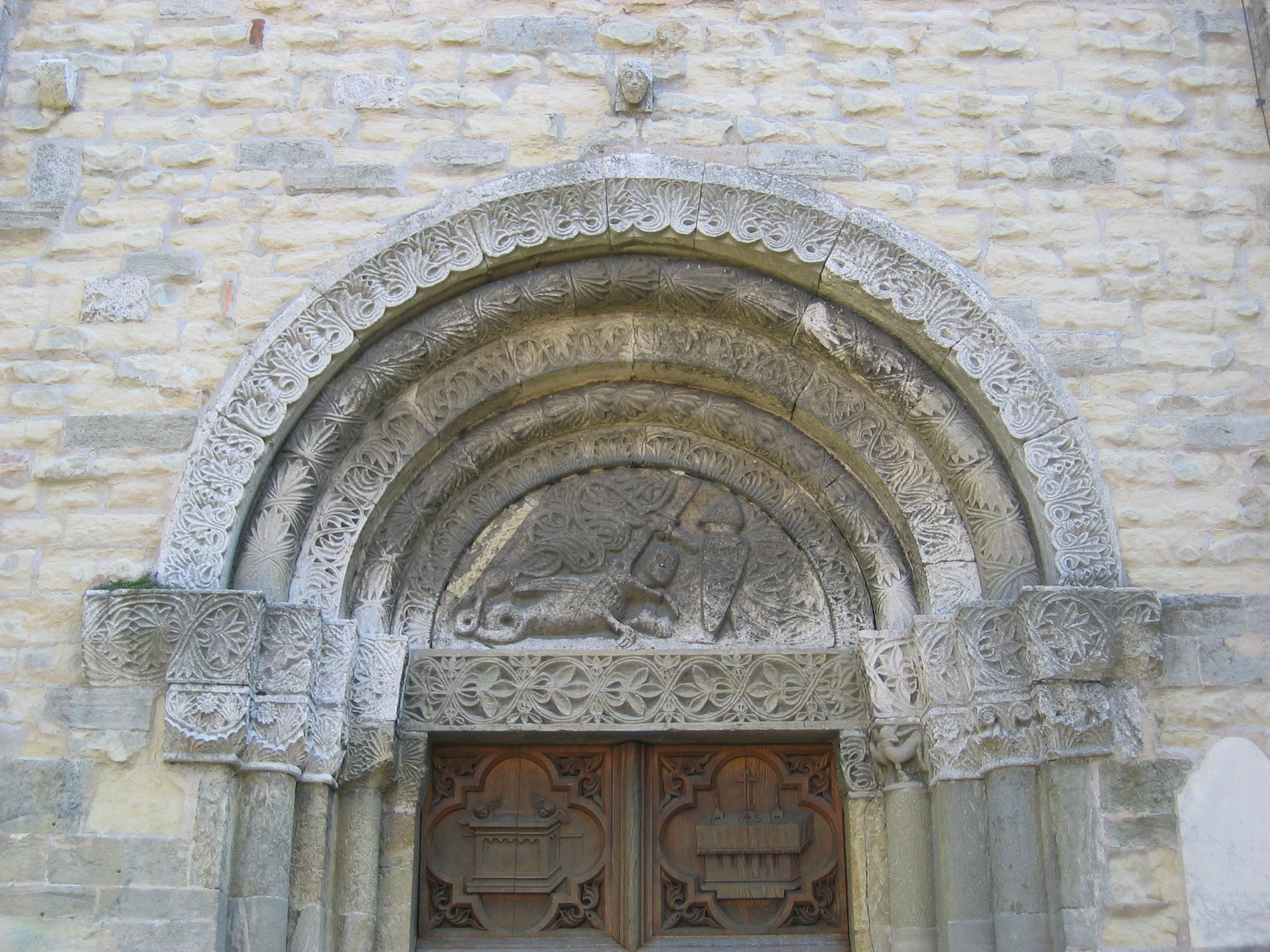
The west portal

St. Peter's is a three-aisled pillar basilica with three apses, and a two-towered western facade. The arcades between the side aisles and the nave rest on rectangular masonry pillars, whose decoration is not original to the building, but was added in the course of the 19th-century restorations.

Two portals provide access to the building, one from the west and one from the south. The tympanum of the west portal portrays a knight, armed with sword and shield, battling a dragon. The head of a man, whom the dragon has swallowed, is visible between its jaws. The representation may allude to the words of Psalm 35/34:

Take hold of shield and buckler, and stand up for mine help. Draw out also the spear, and stop the way against them that persecute me: say unto my soul, I am thy salvation.

The scene would therefore have Christological significance, with the words of the Psalm understood typologically to refer to Christ as a warrior against evil.

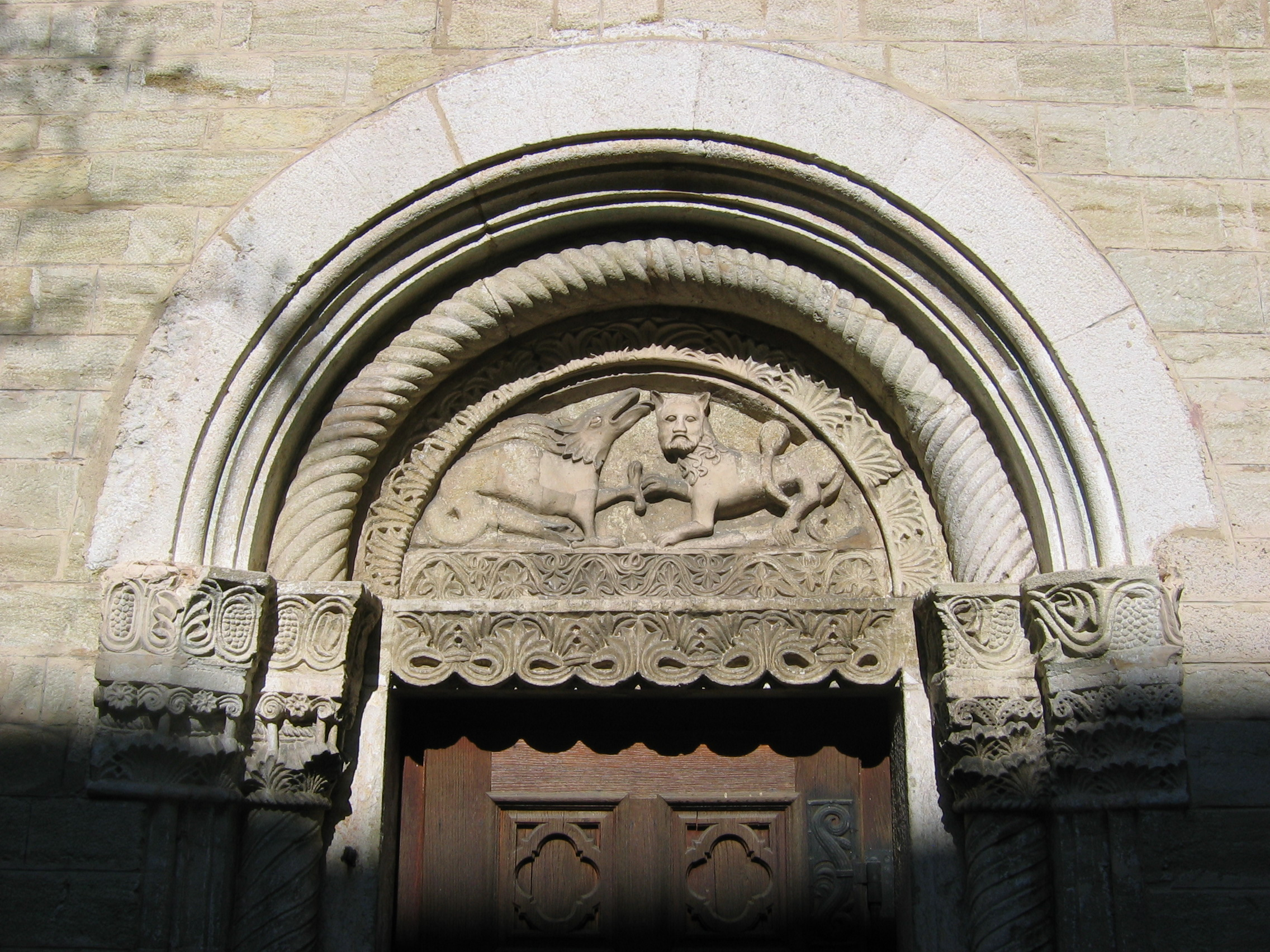
The south portal

The south portal is somewhat more mysterious. It portrays two animals, at left perhaps a griffin or another dragon, and at right a lion. The two beasts may likewise be engaged in battle. An opposition between good and evil, similar to that on the west portal, is likely intended, perhaps with reference to medieval animal stories such as those found in the Physiologus.

== Chapels ==
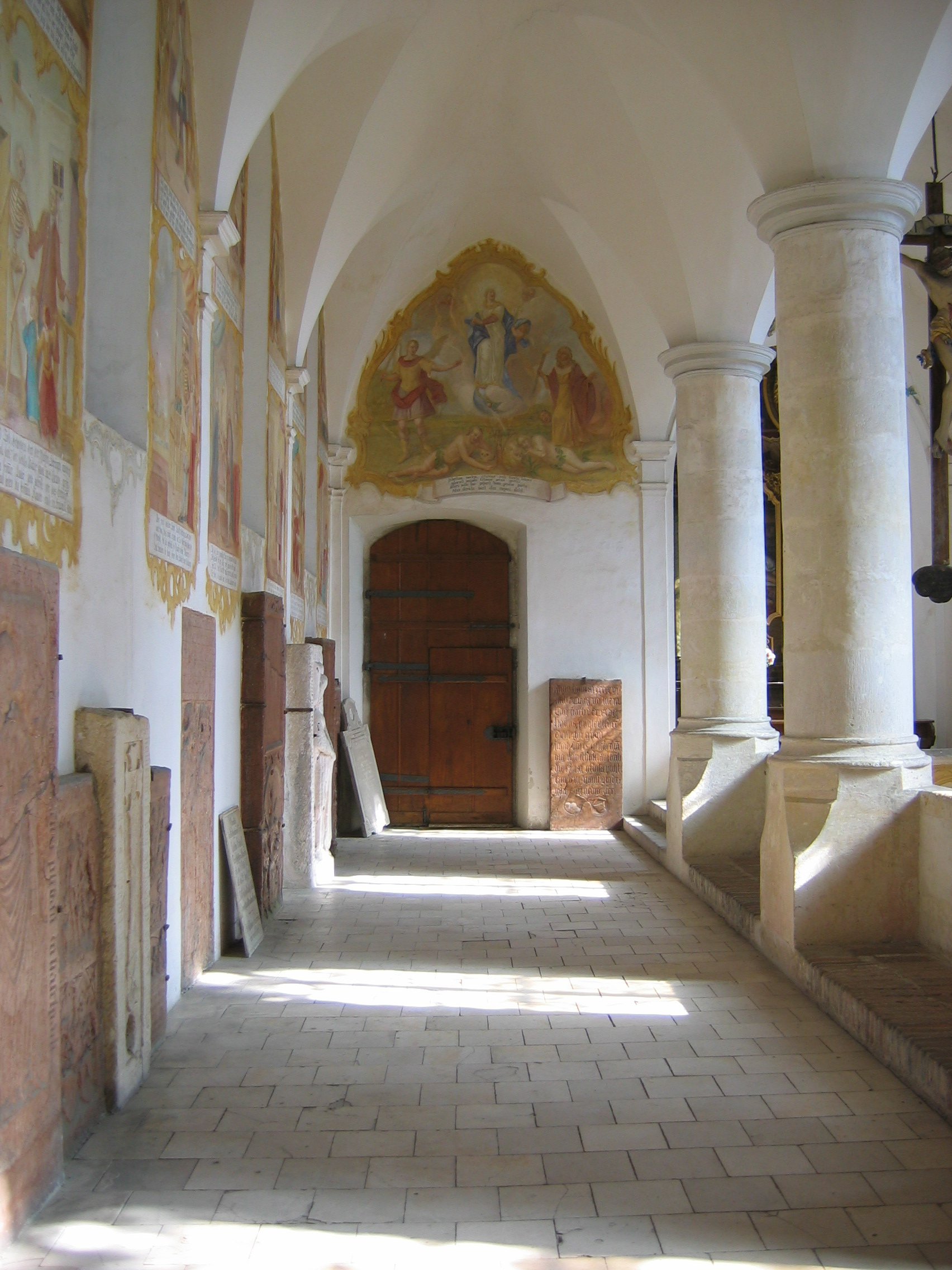
The Totenkapelle

The graveyard surrounding St. Peter's includes three free-standing chapels: a Kapelle Unserer Lieben Frau (Chapel of Our Dear Lady), perhaps originally Romanesque, with a 15th-century ossuary; the Agnes-Bernauer-Kapelle, the burial place of the like-named secret wife of Albert III of Bavaria, executed on charges of witchcraft; and the Totenkapelle (Chapel of the Dead), built in 1486. The latter is perhaps of the greatest artistic significance, on account of its extensive cycle of paintings representing the Totentanz (Dance of the Dead), created by the Rococo artist Felix Hözl (died 1774), a resident of Straubing, in 1763. The cycle is of note as an 18th-century treatment of a predominantly medieval theme.

== Sources ==
- Alfons Huber: Totentanz- oder Seelenkapelle im Friedhof der Pfarrkirche St. Peter, Straubing (=Schnell Kunstführer Nr. 529). Regensburg, 2003, ISBN 3-7954-6456-0
- Hugo Schnell and Hans Utz: Pfarrkirche St. Peter, Straubing (=Schnell Kunstführer Nr. 1005). Regensburg, 2003, ISBN 3-7954-4739-9
- Richard Strobel and Markus Weis: Romanik in Altbayern. Würzburg, 1994, ISBN 3-429-01616-9

== Additional Photos: St. Peter's Graveyard ==
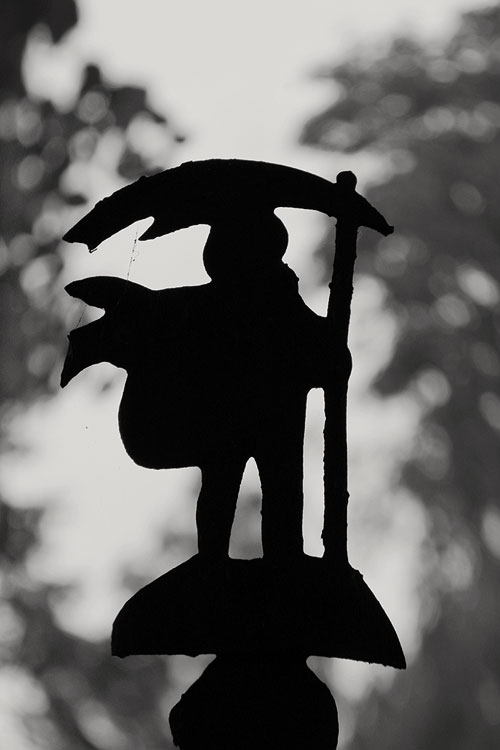

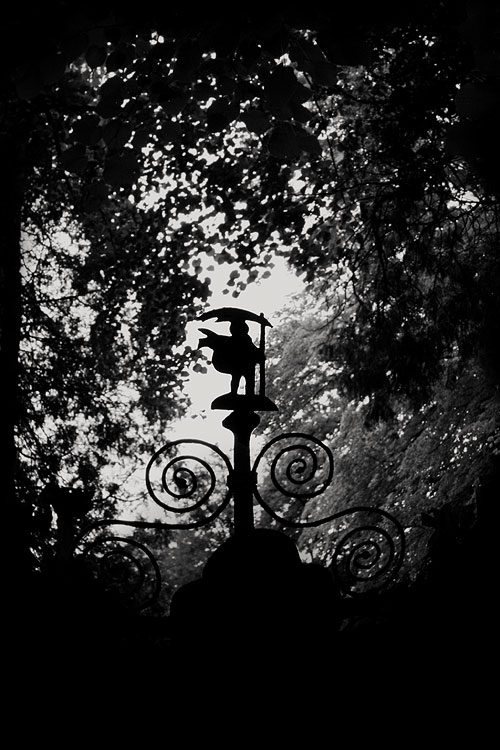

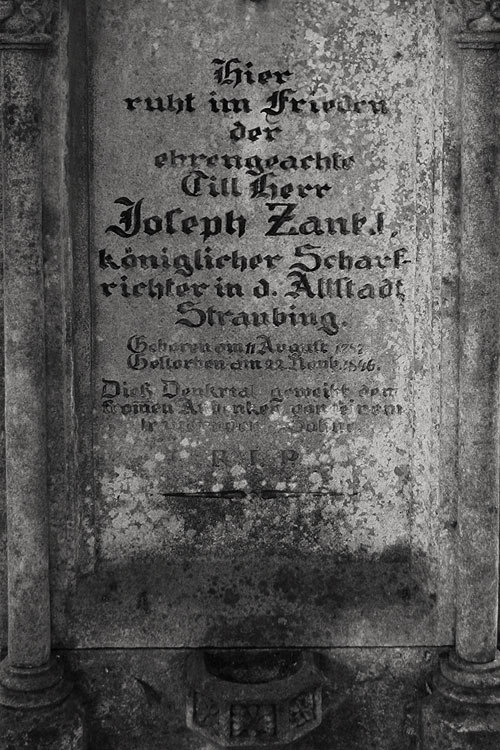

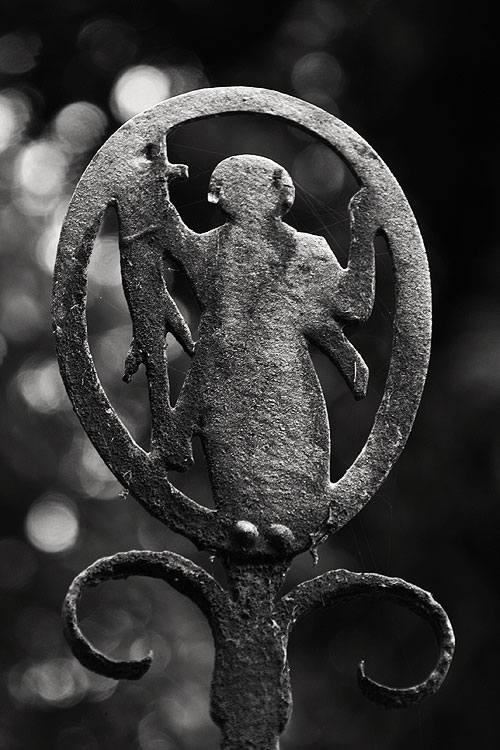

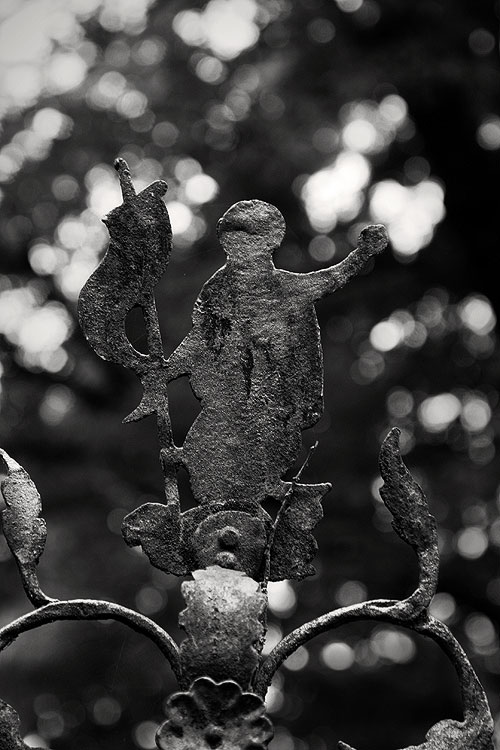

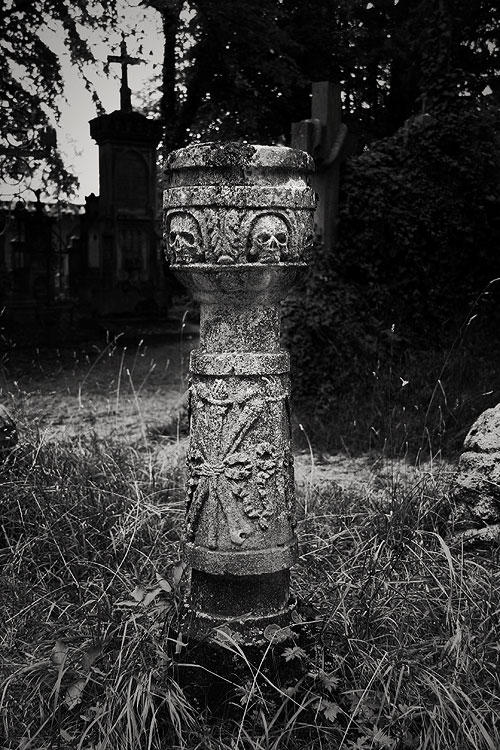

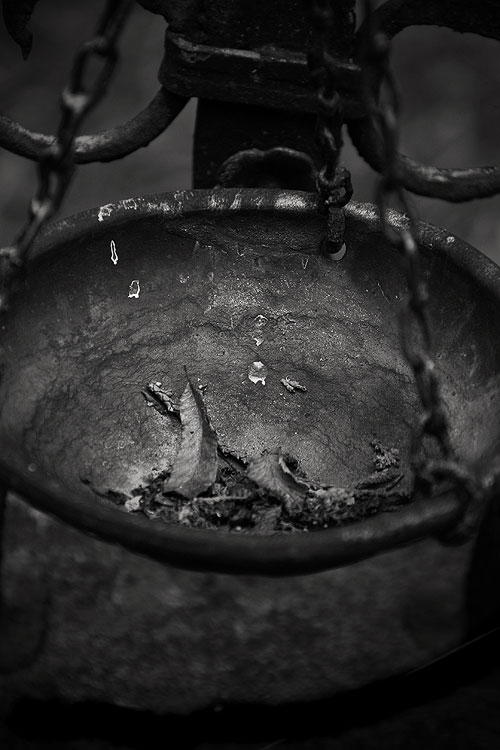

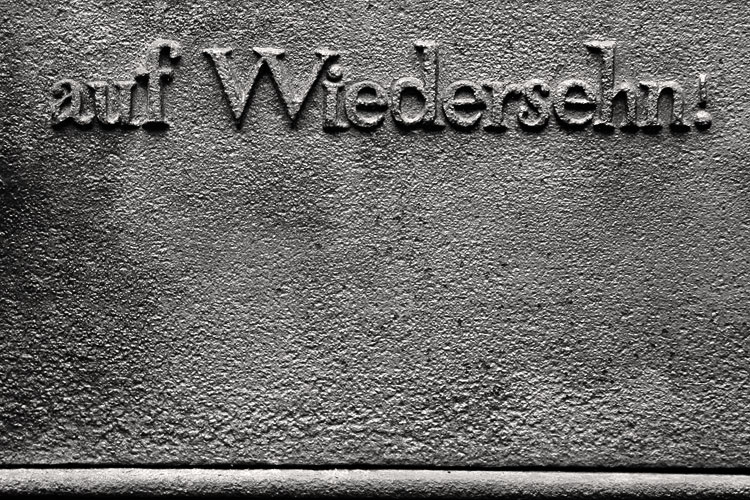

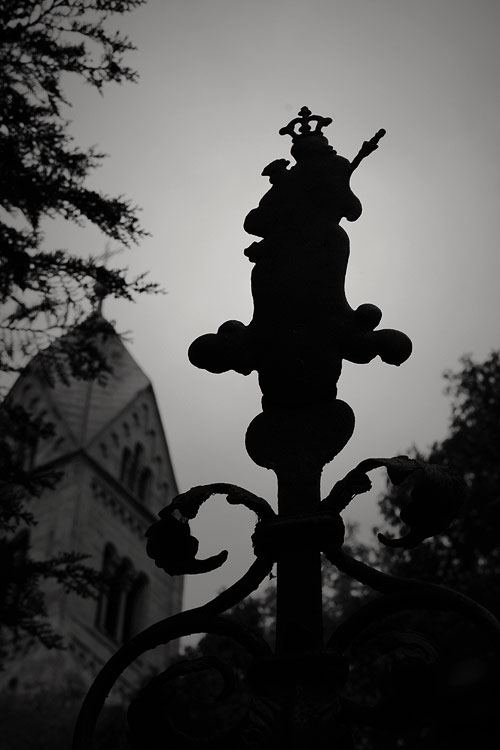

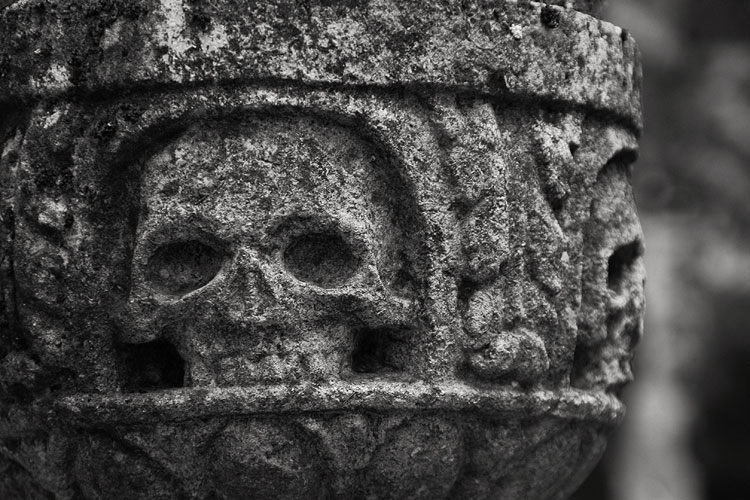

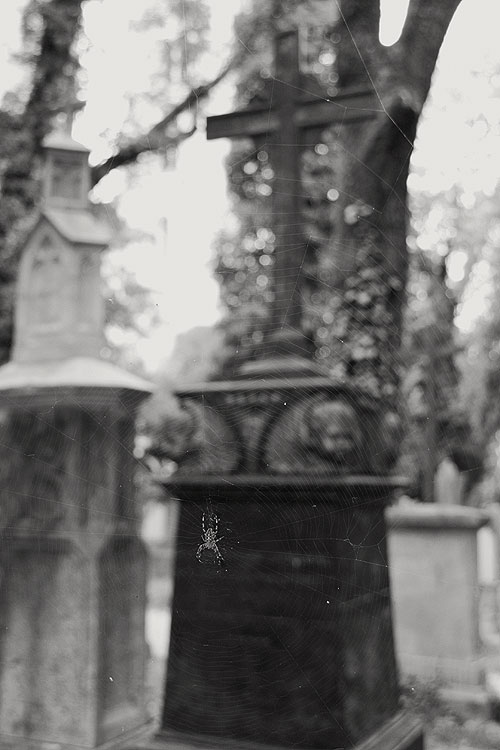

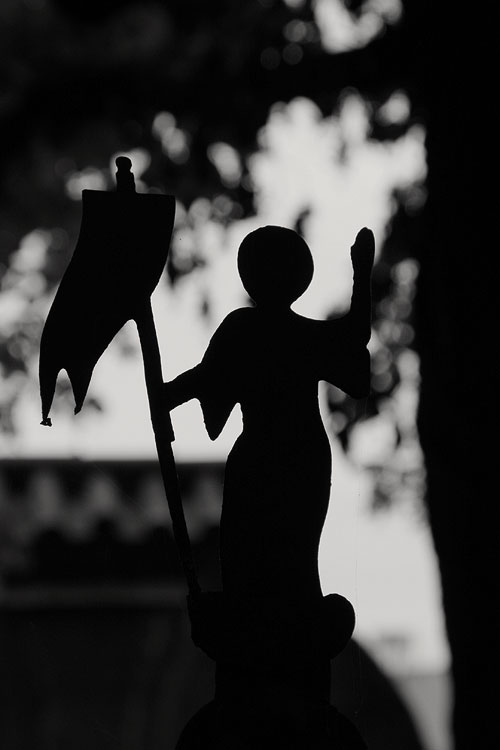

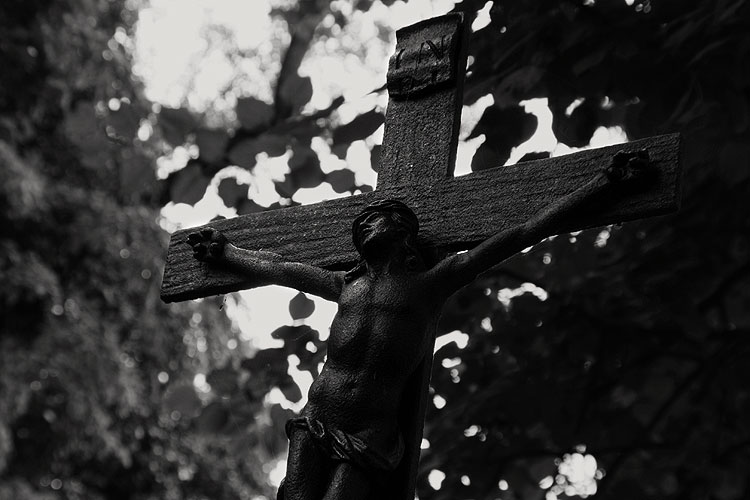

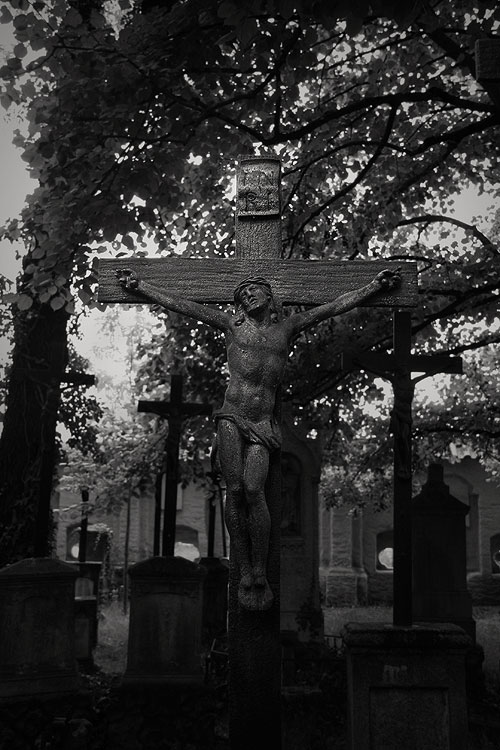

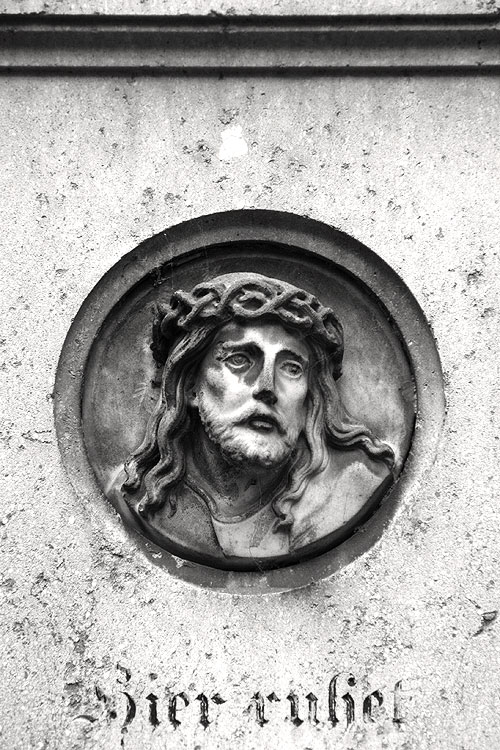

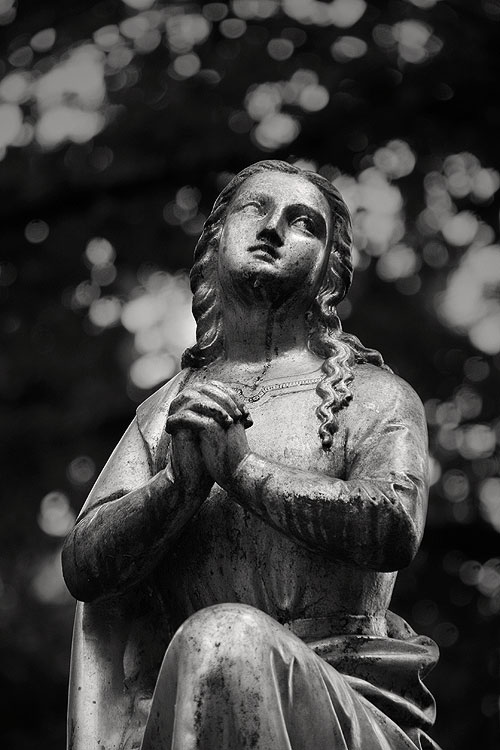

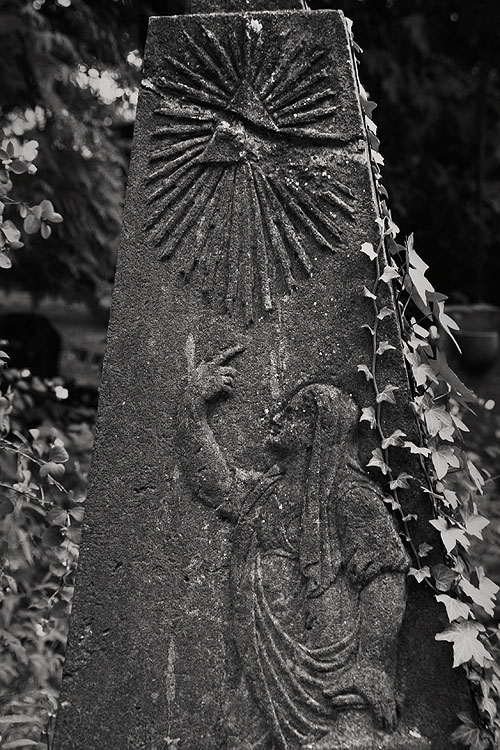

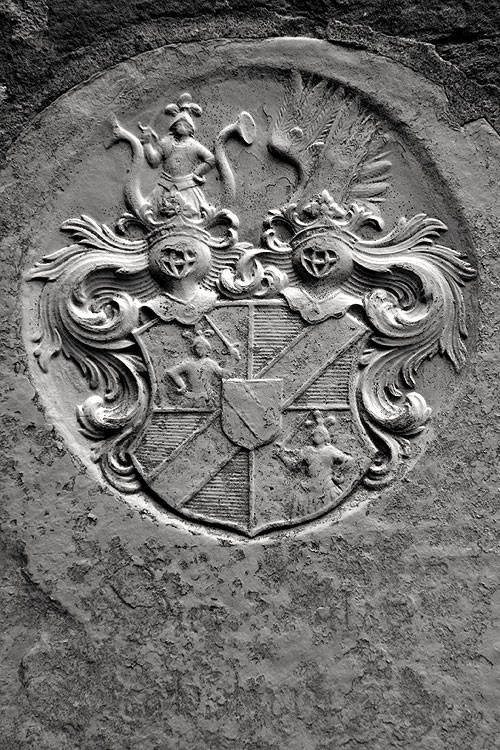

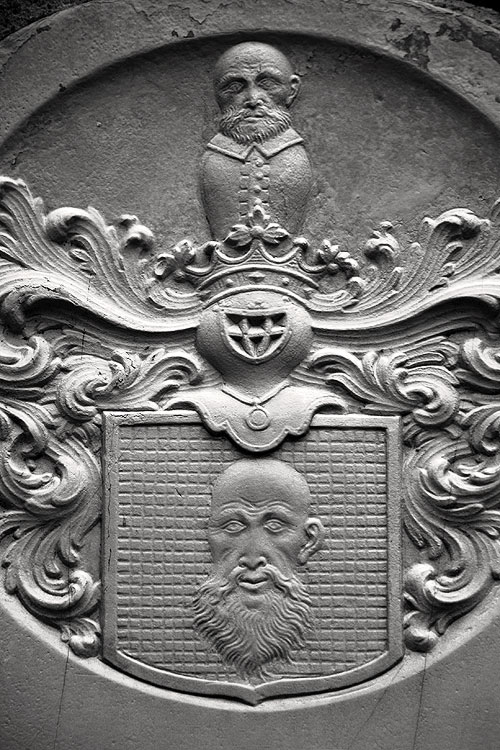

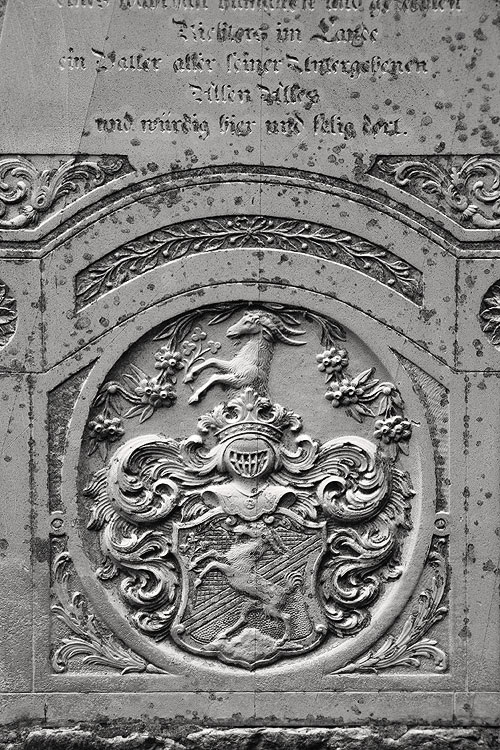

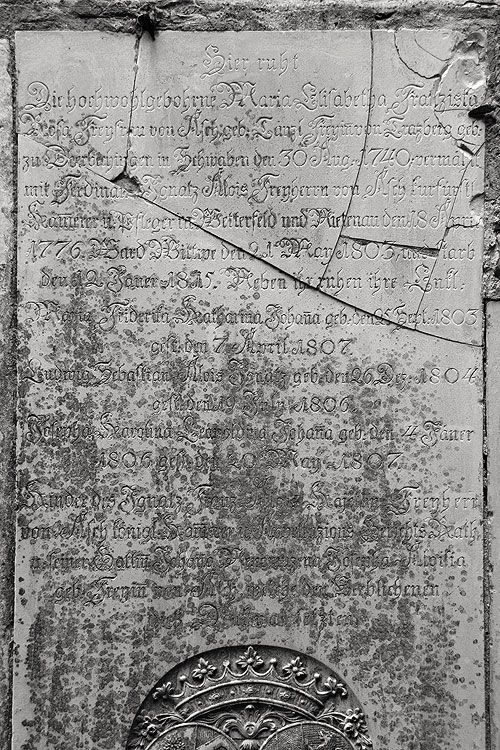

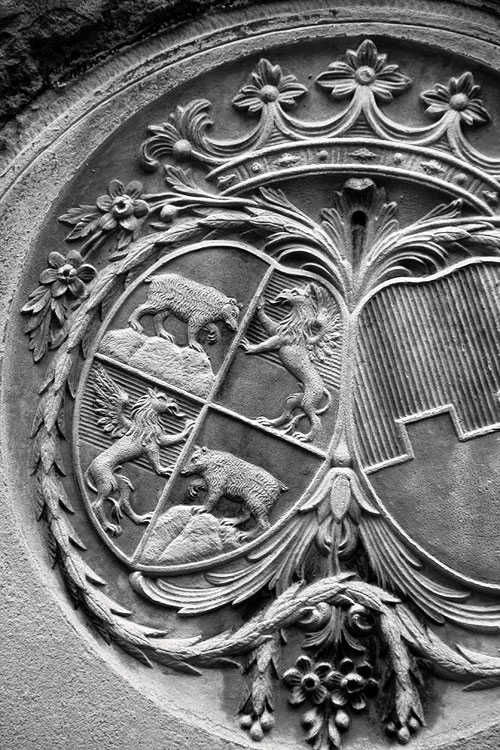

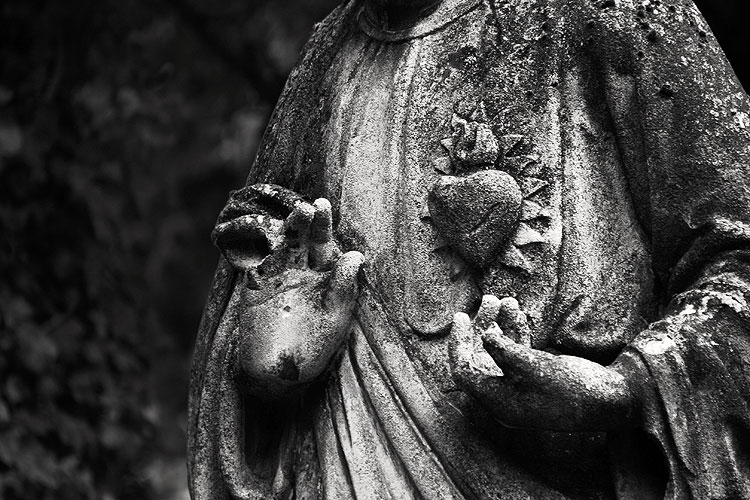

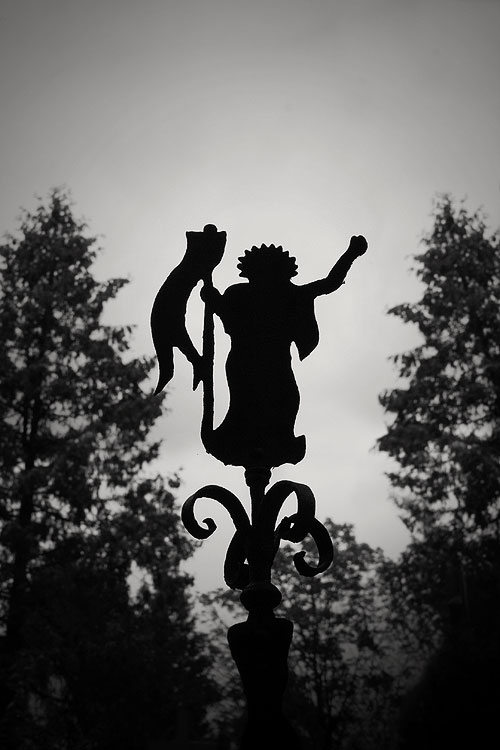

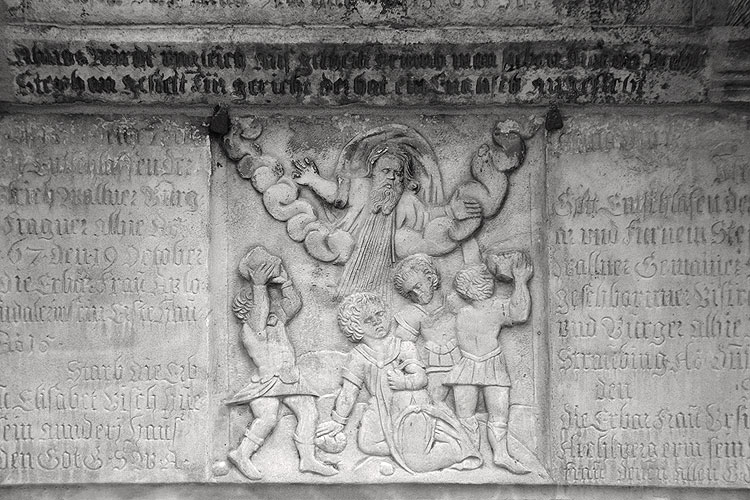

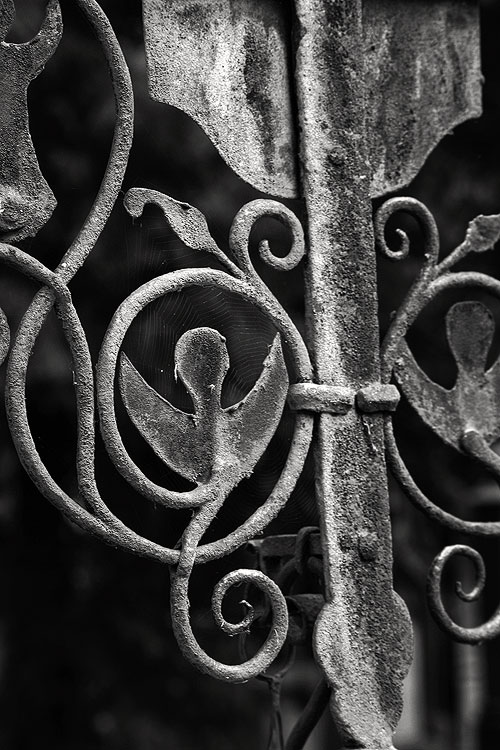

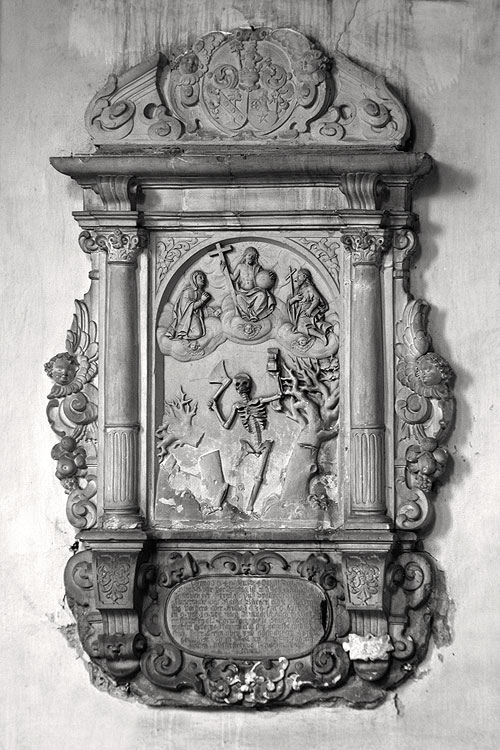

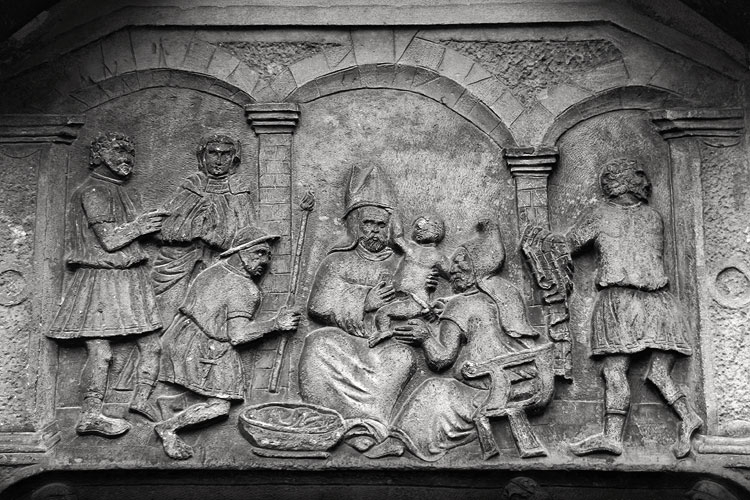

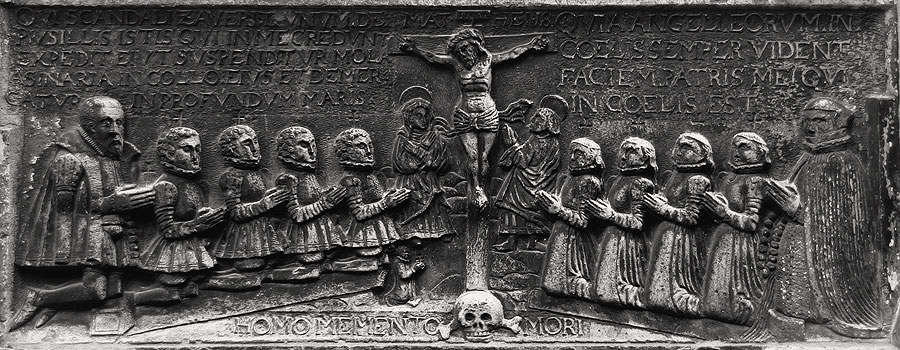

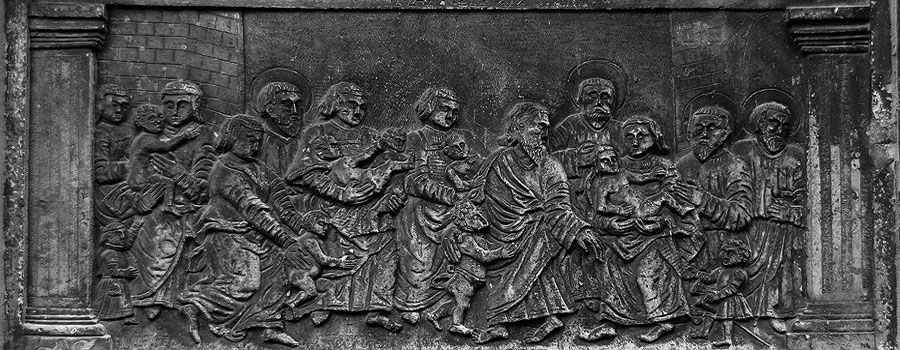

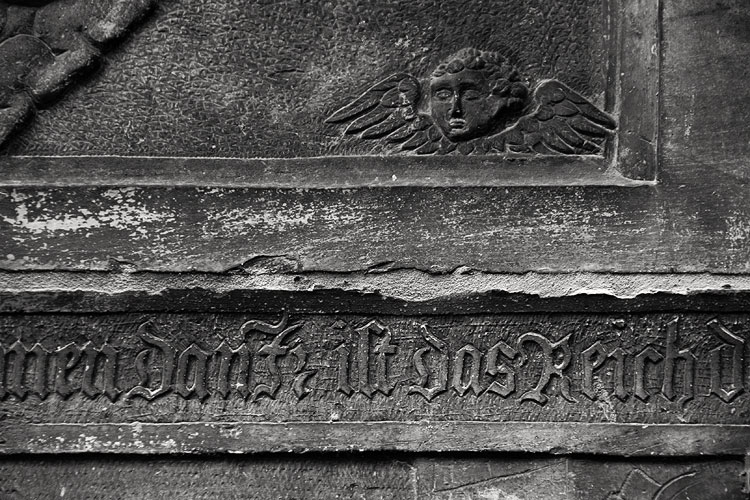

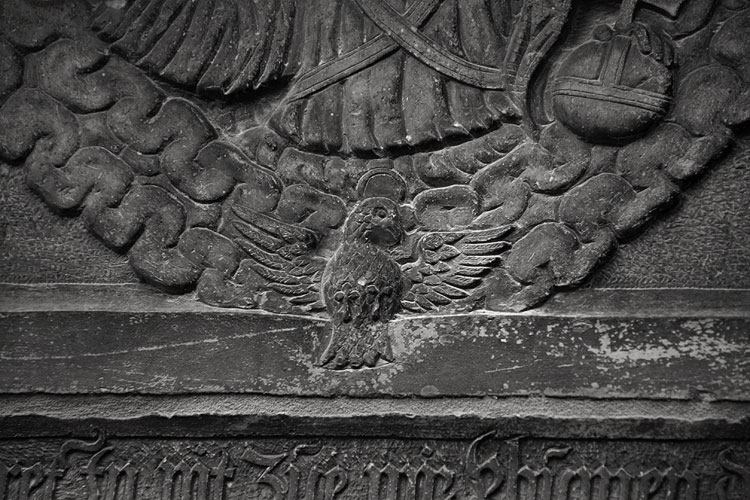

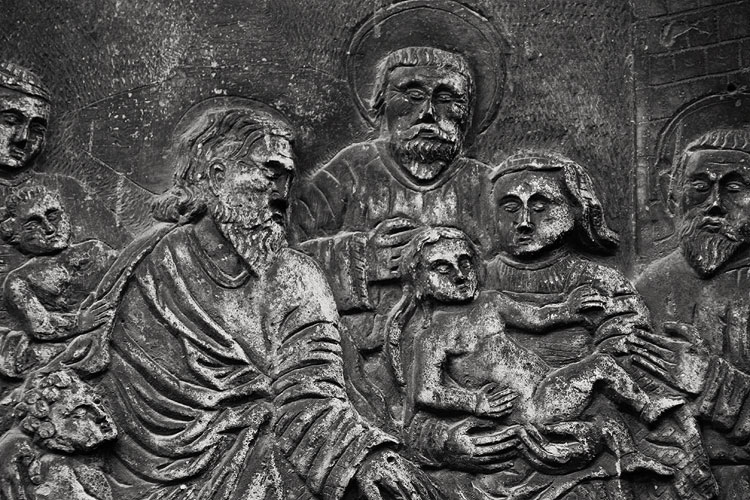

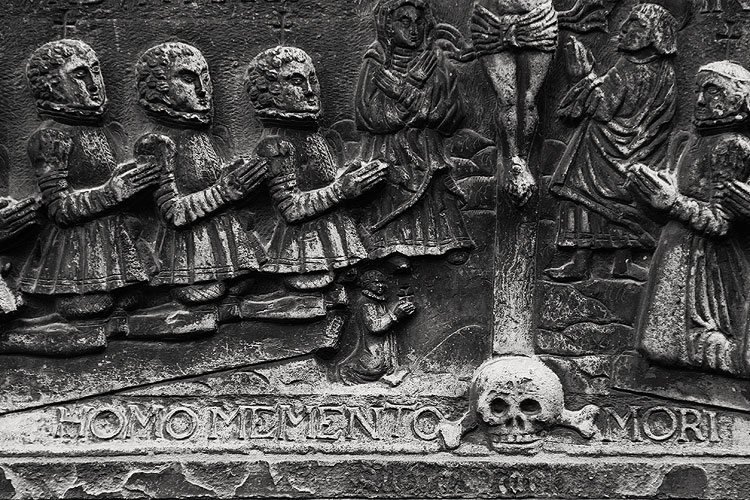

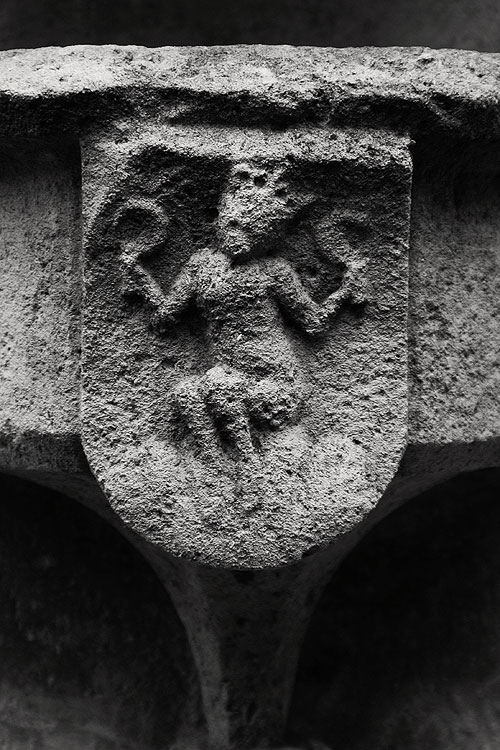

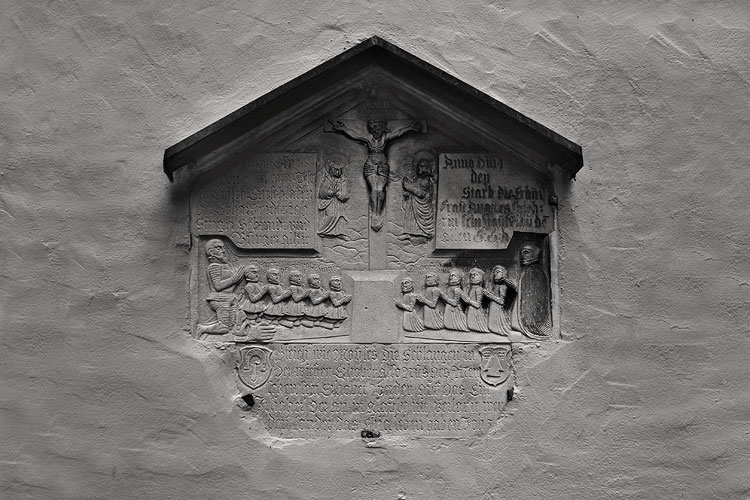

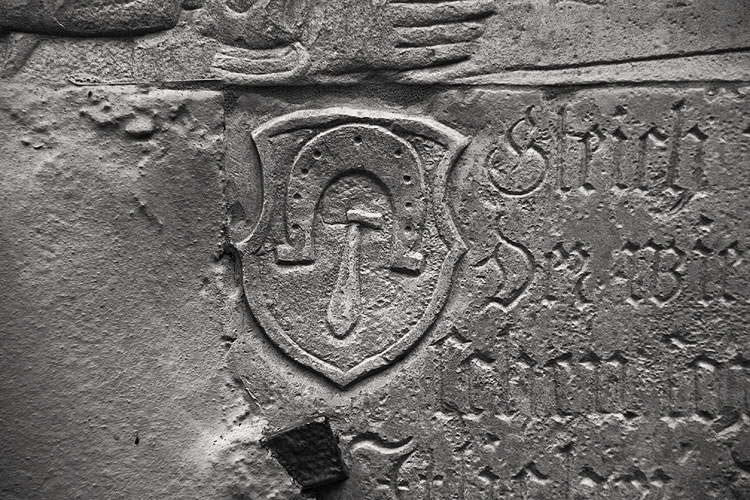

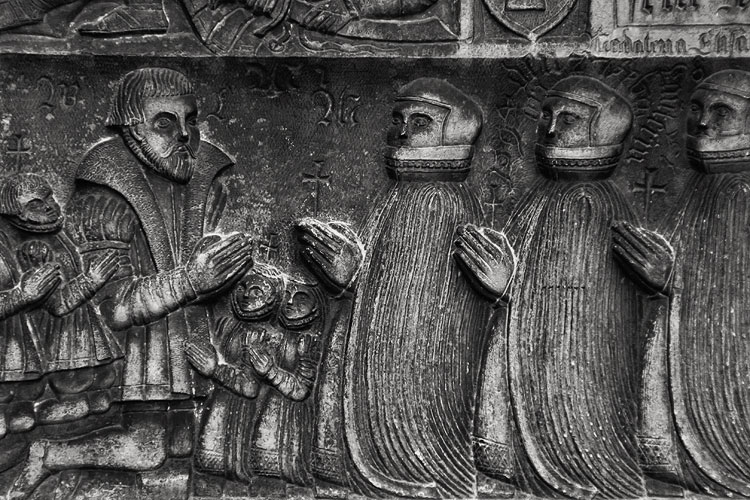

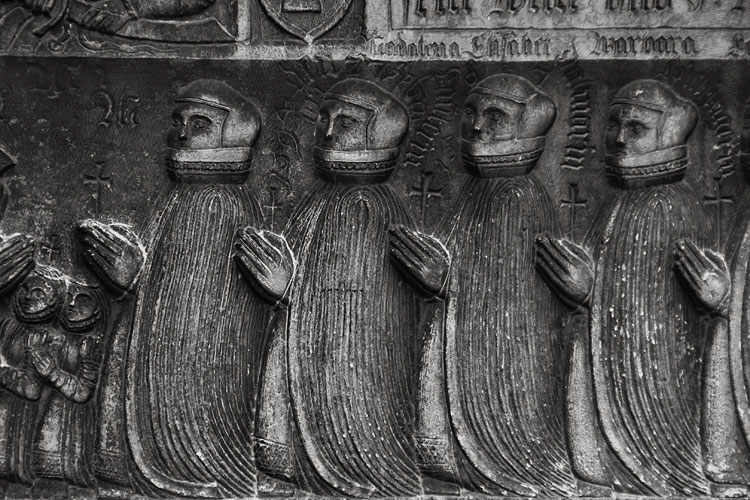

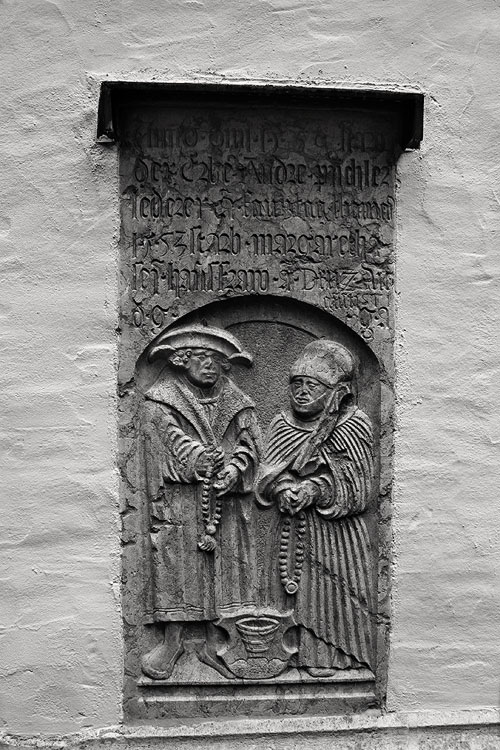

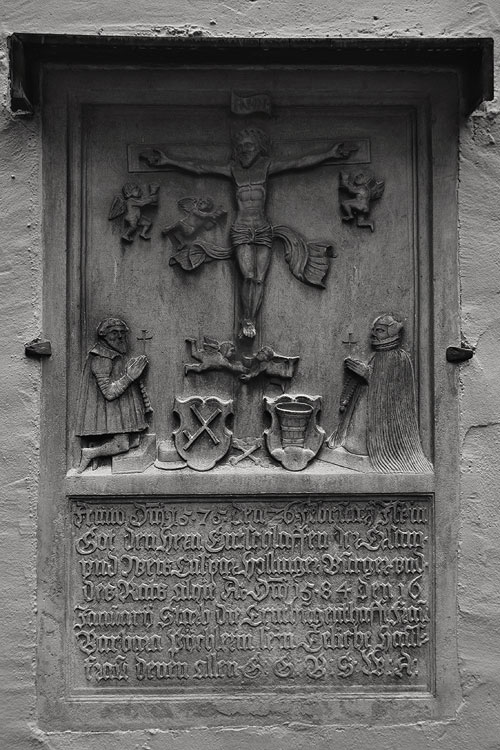

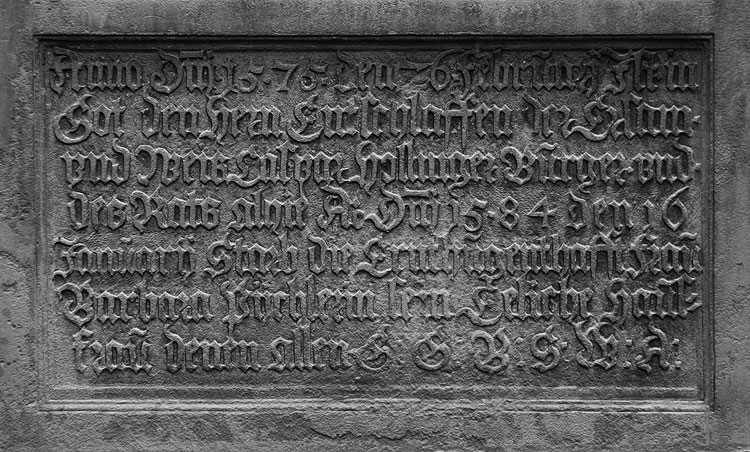

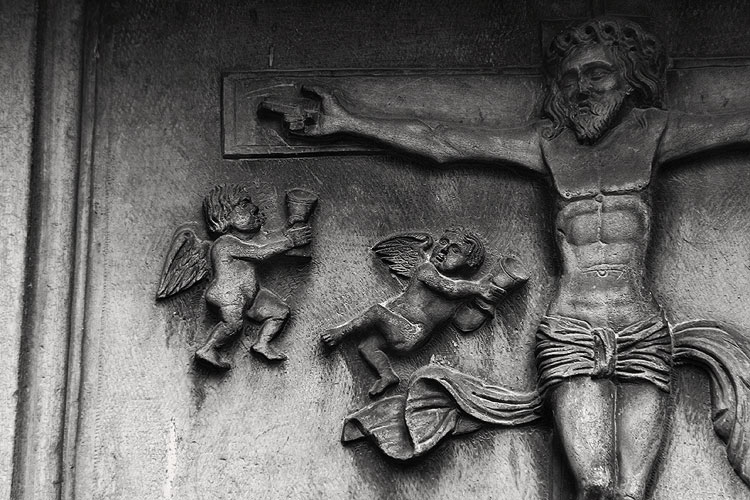

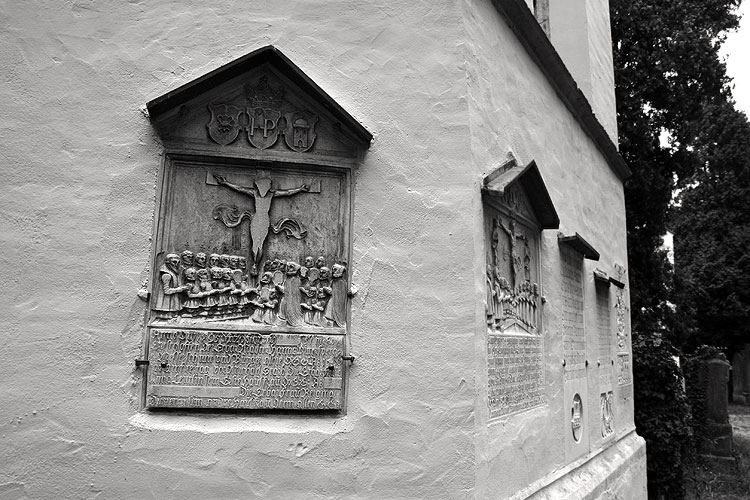

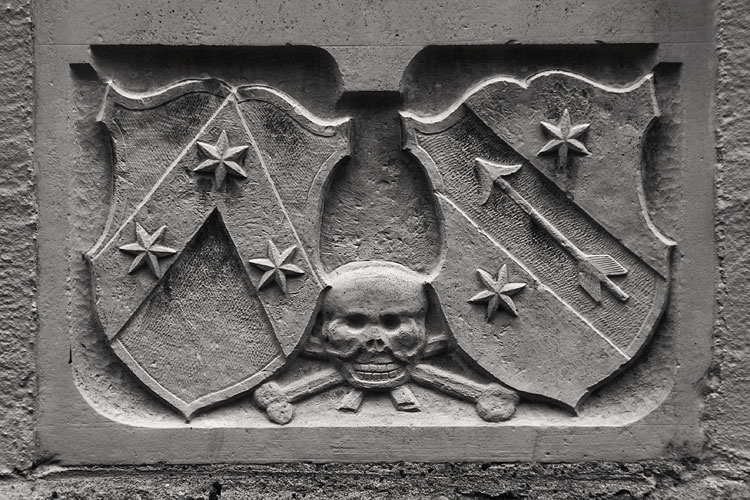

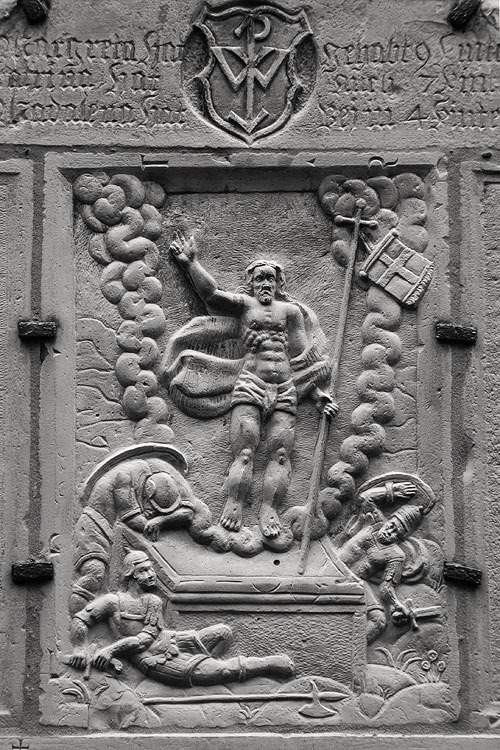

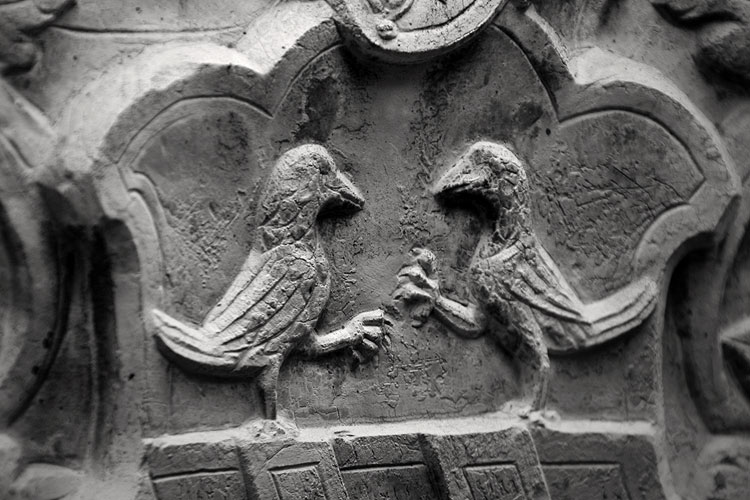

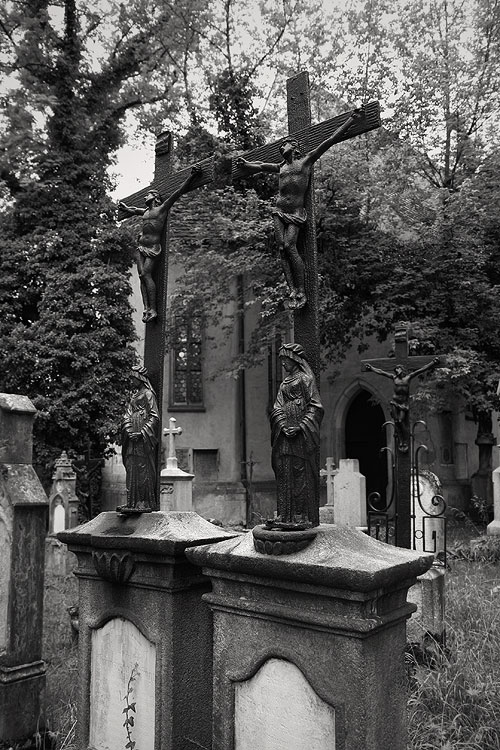

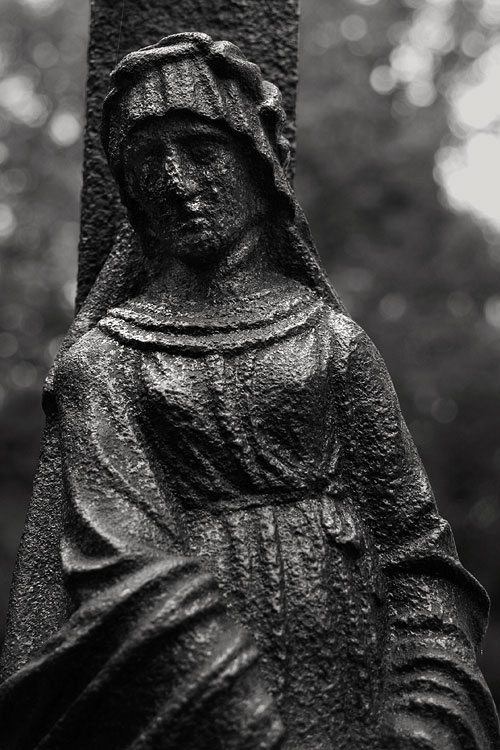

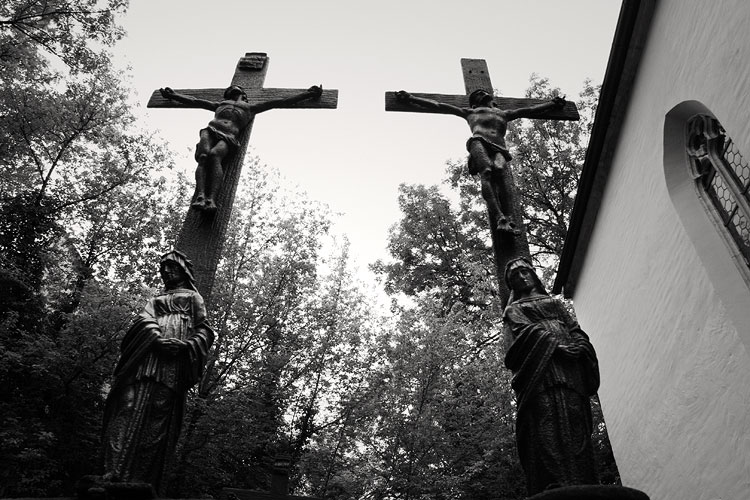

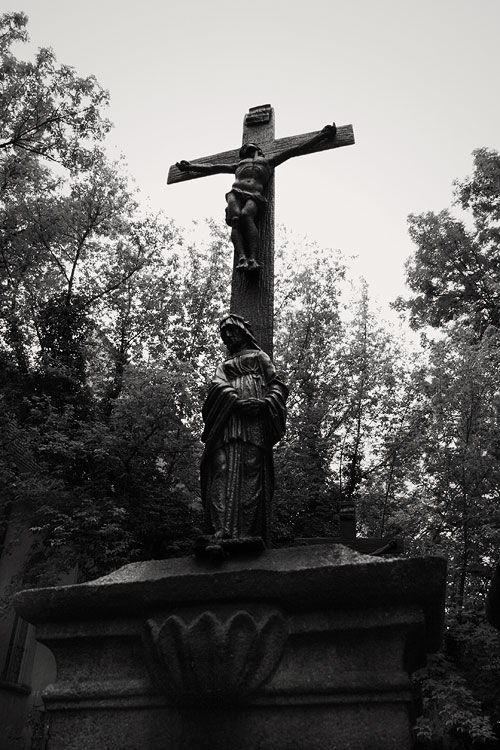

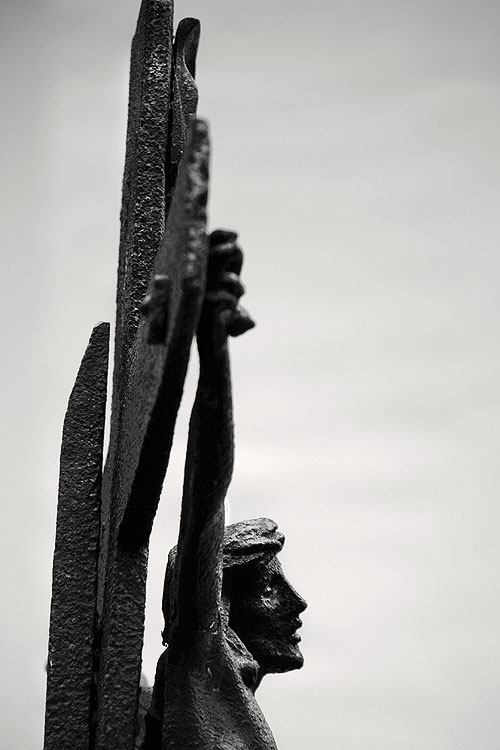

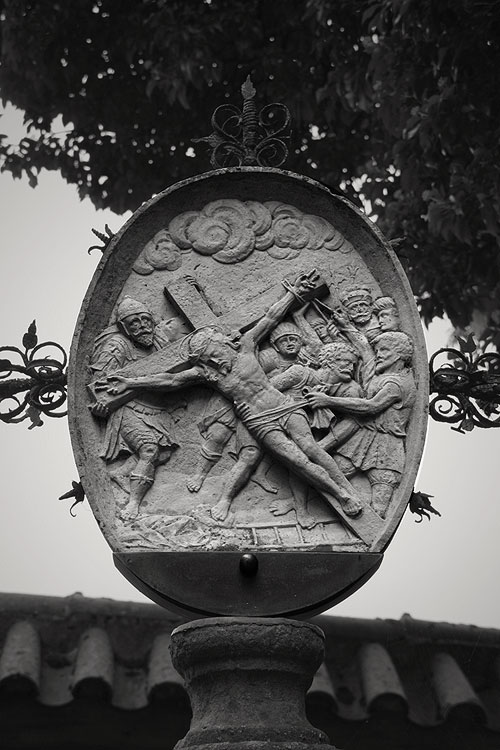

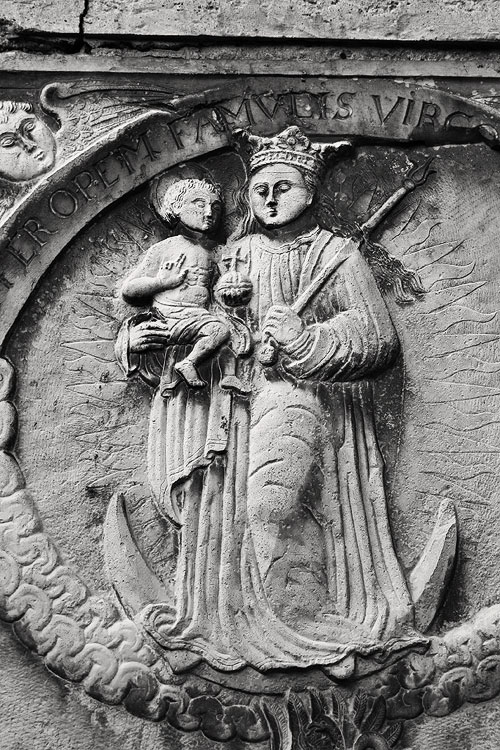

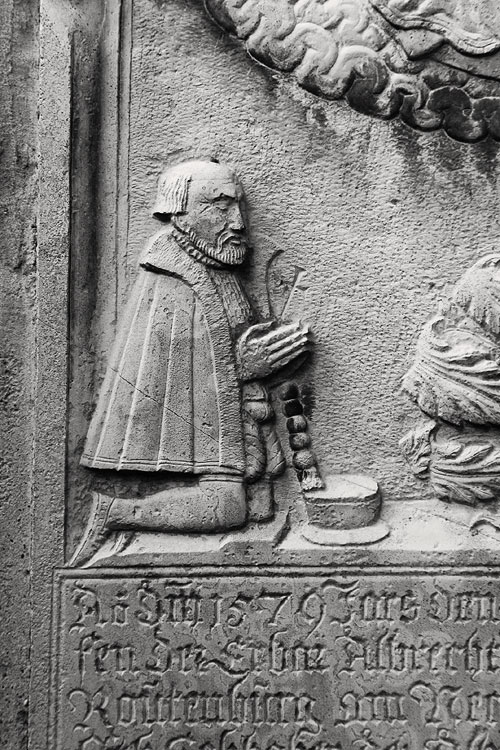

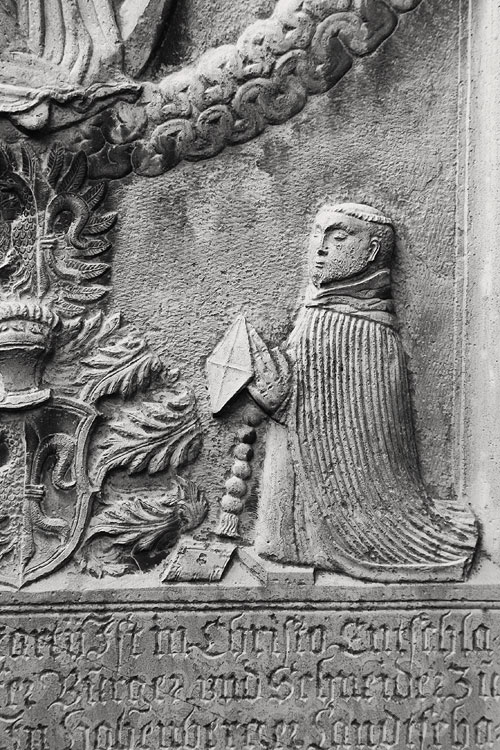

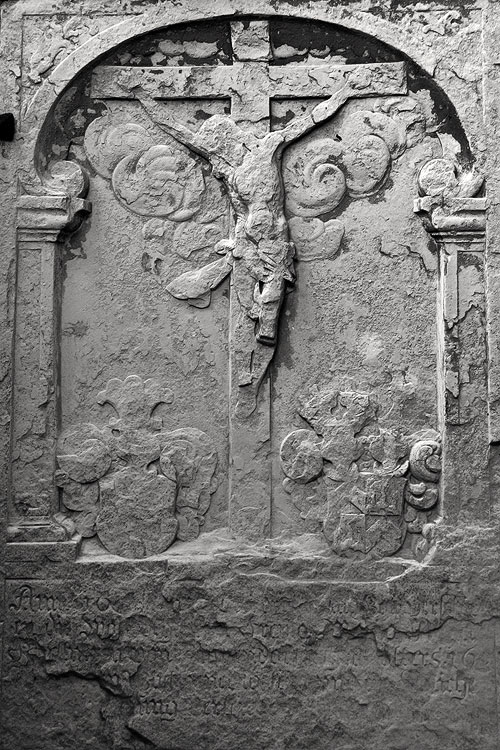

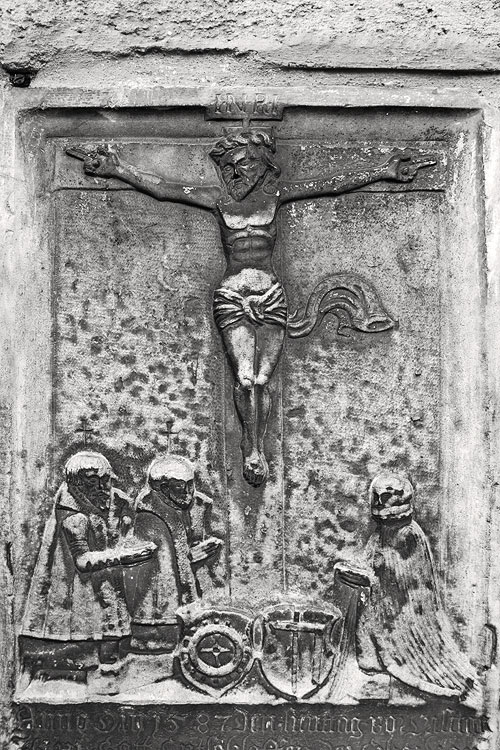

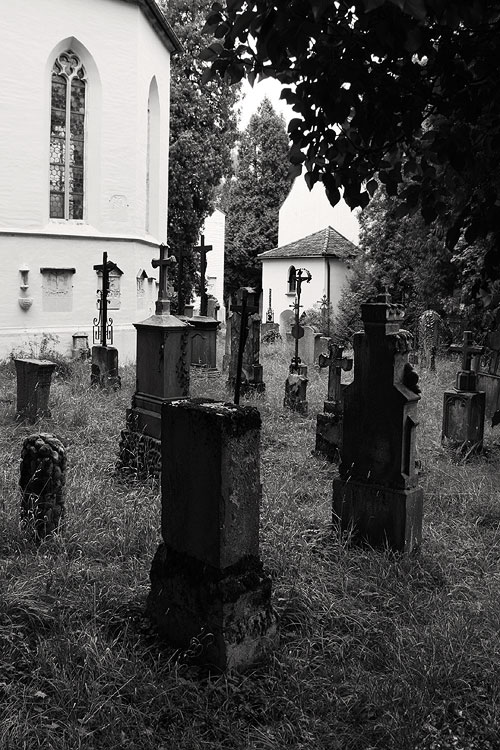

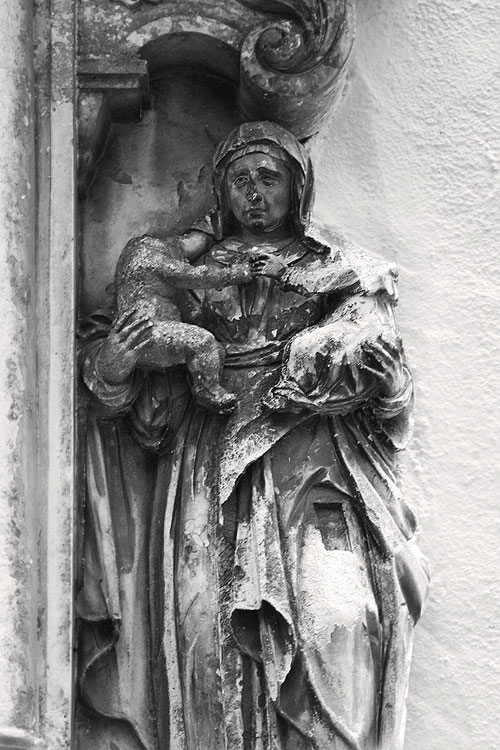

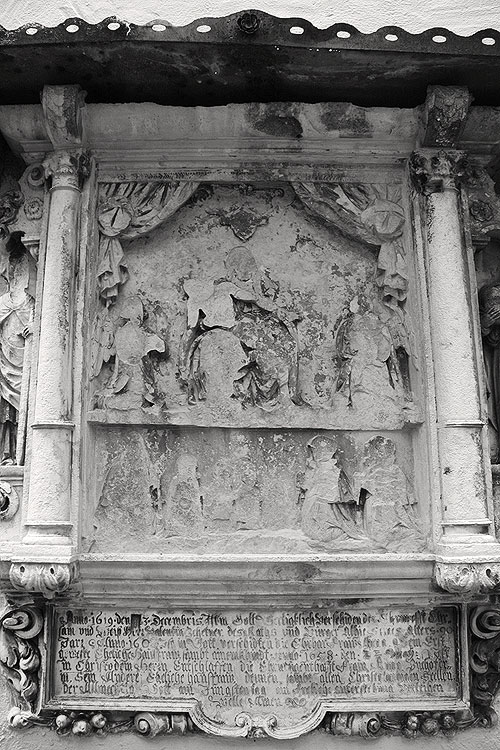

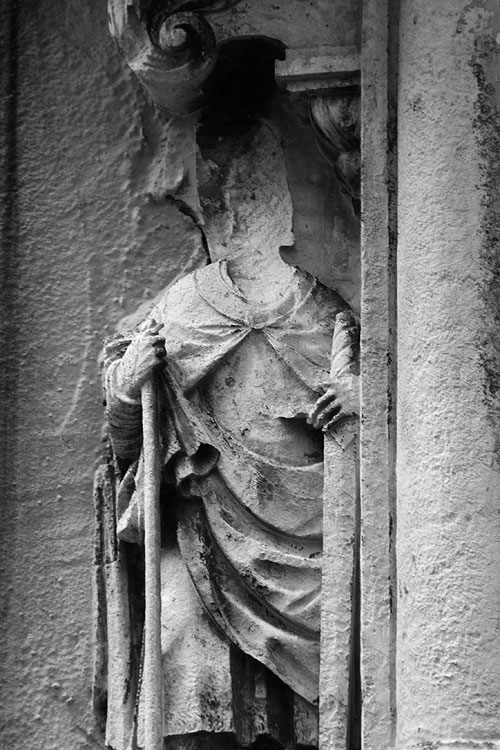

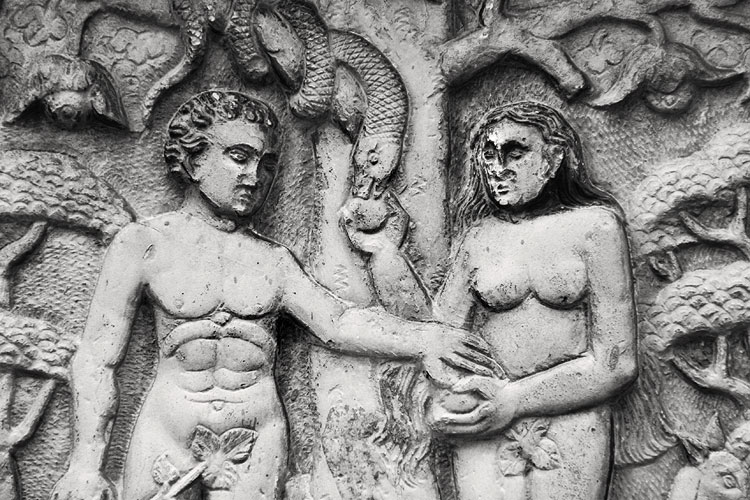

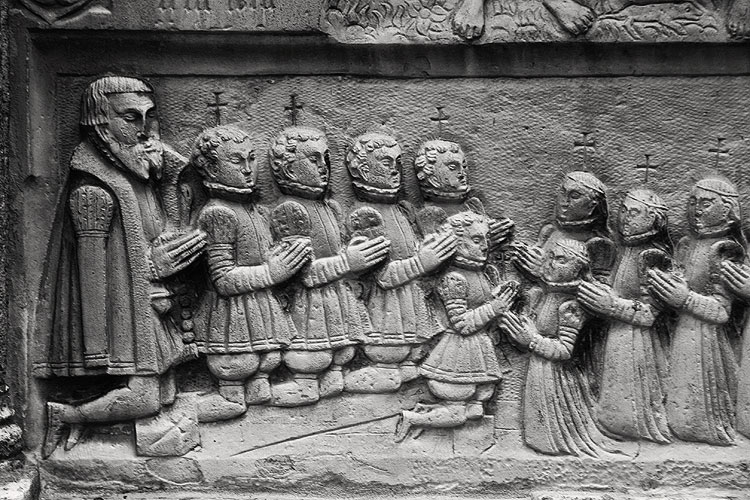

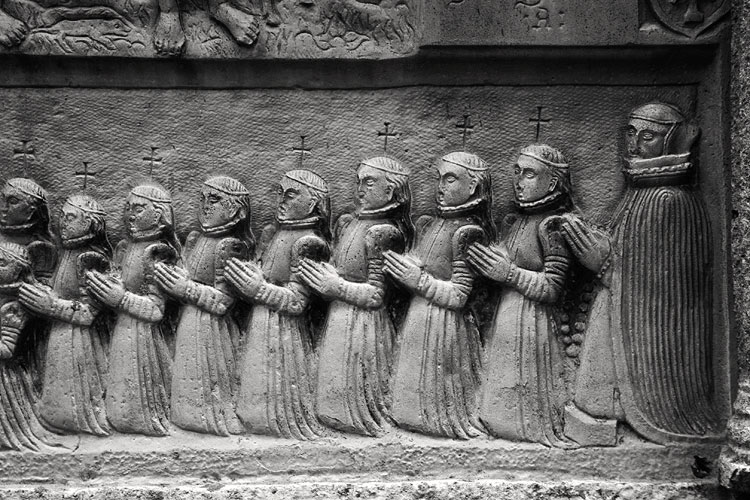

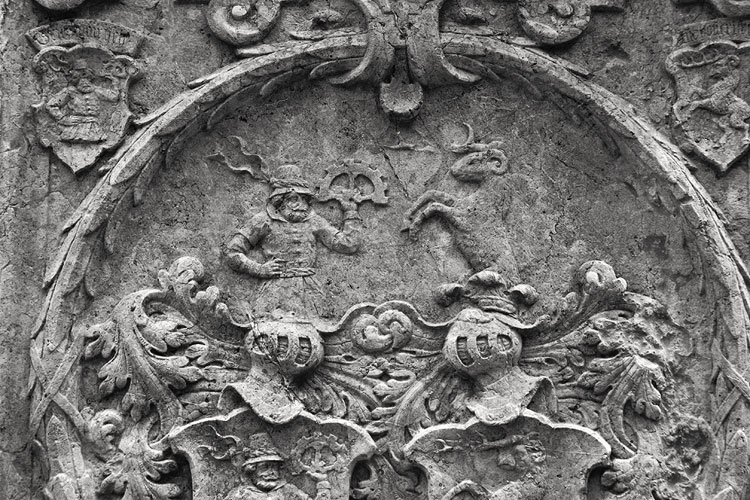

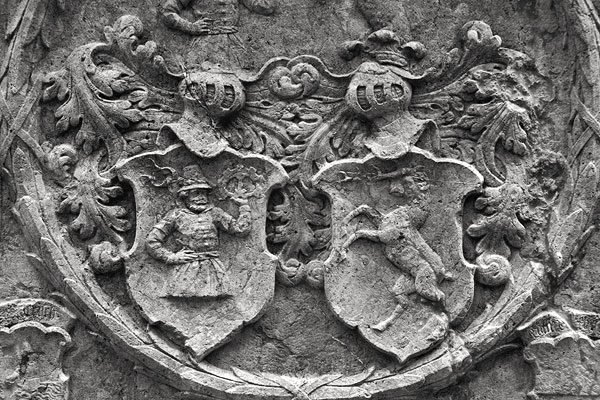

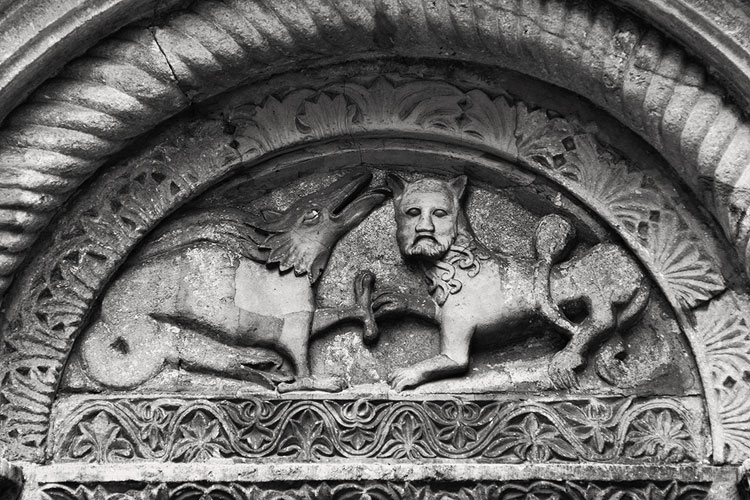

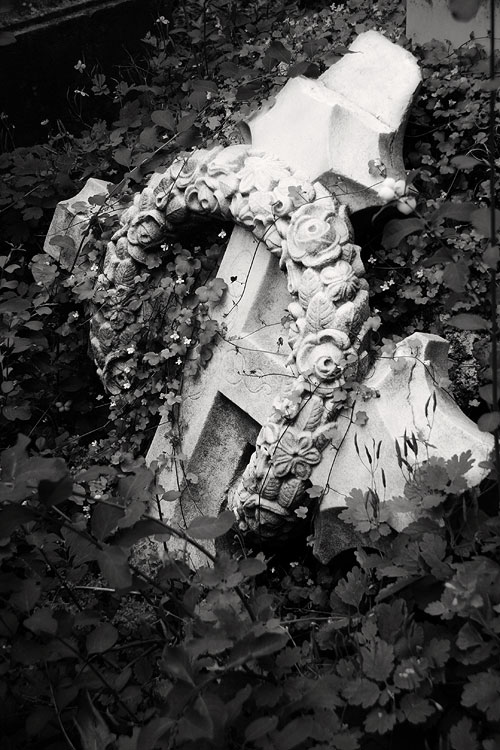

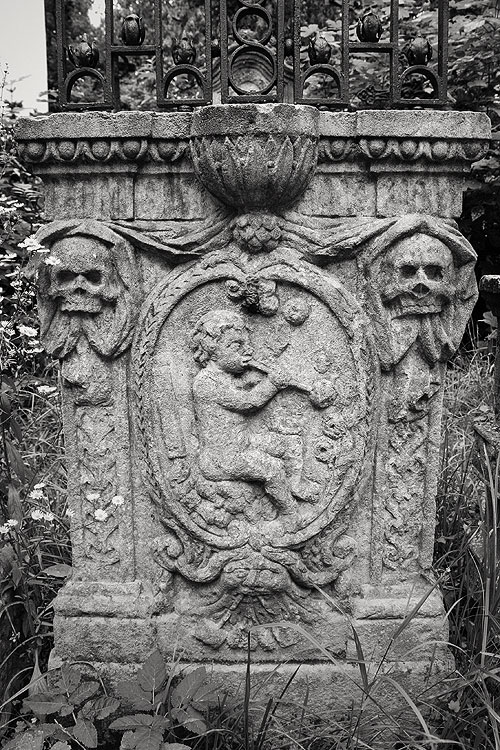

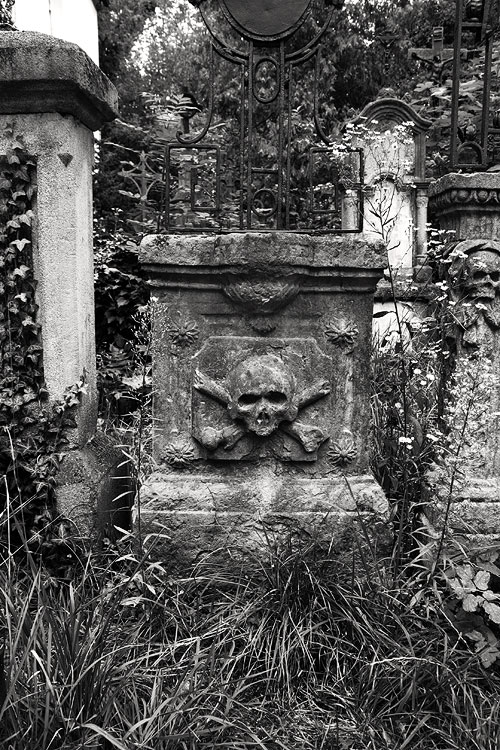

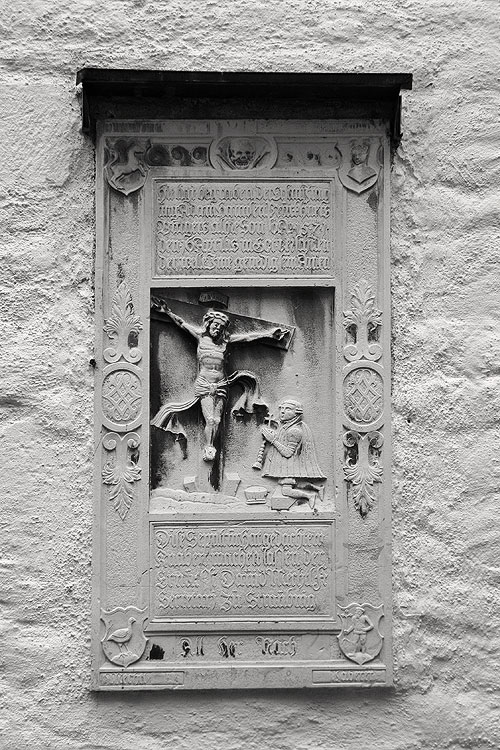

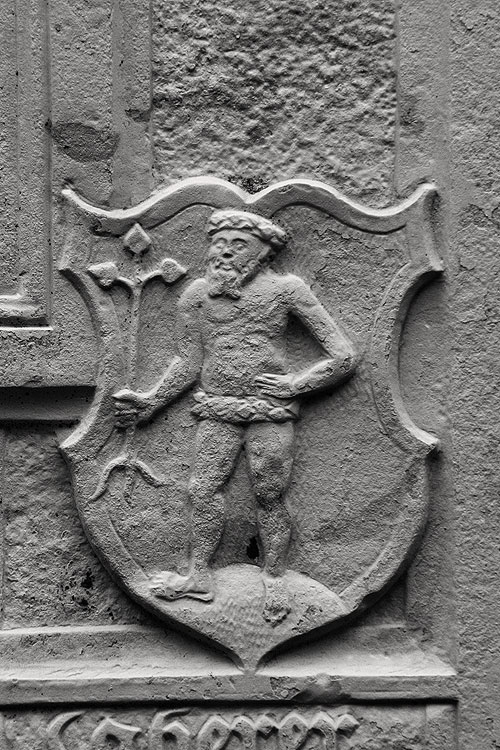

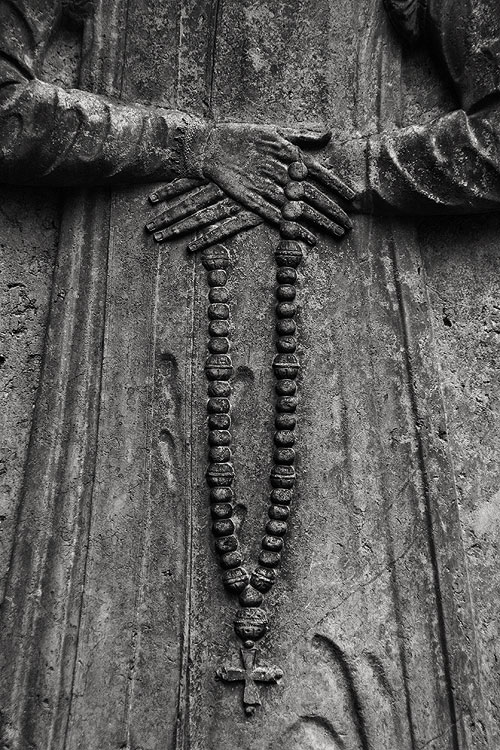

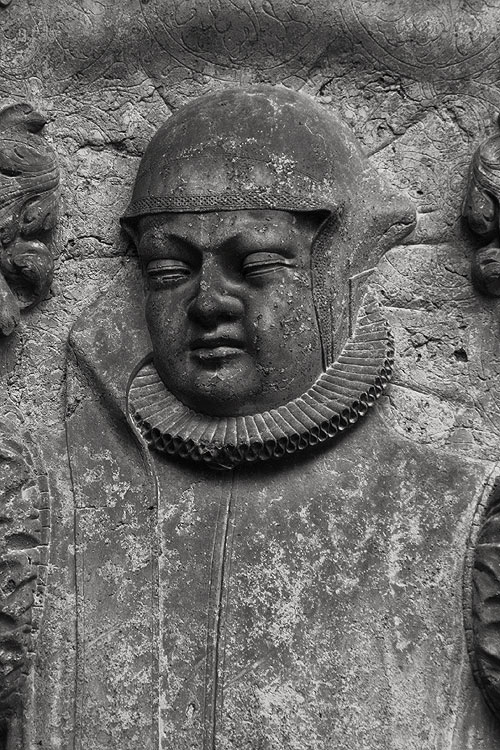

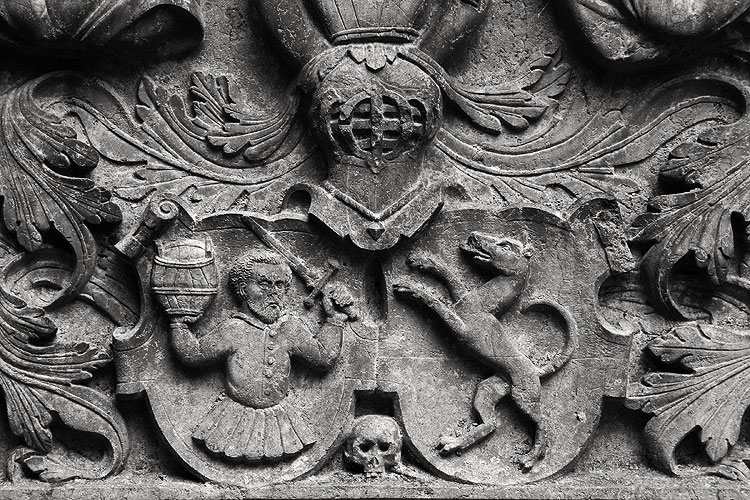

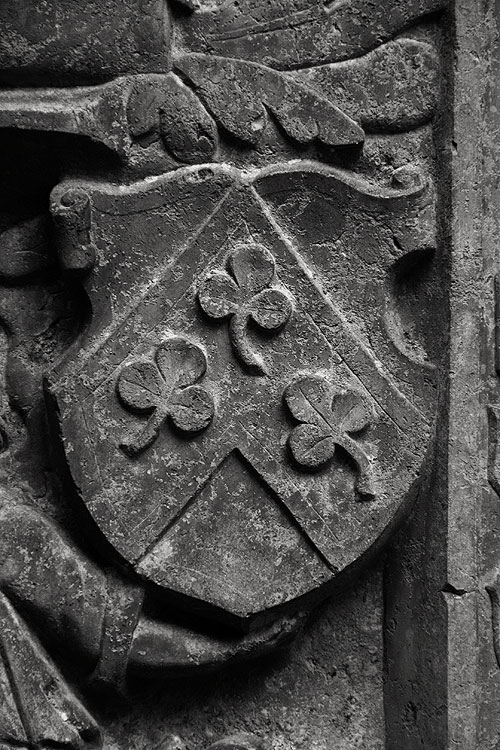

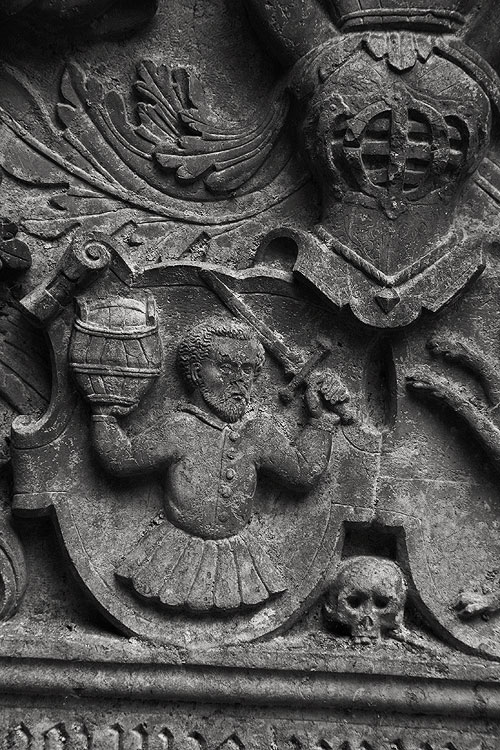

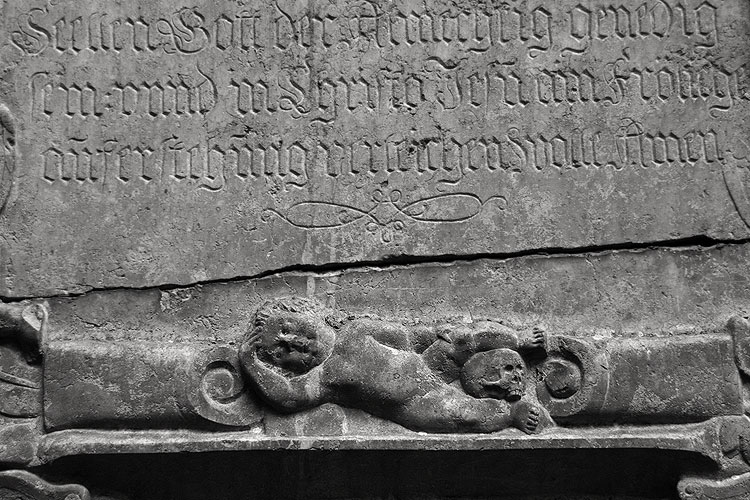

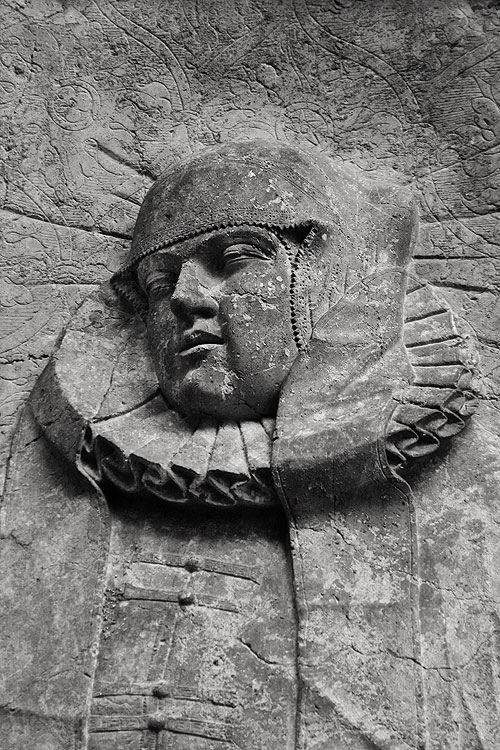

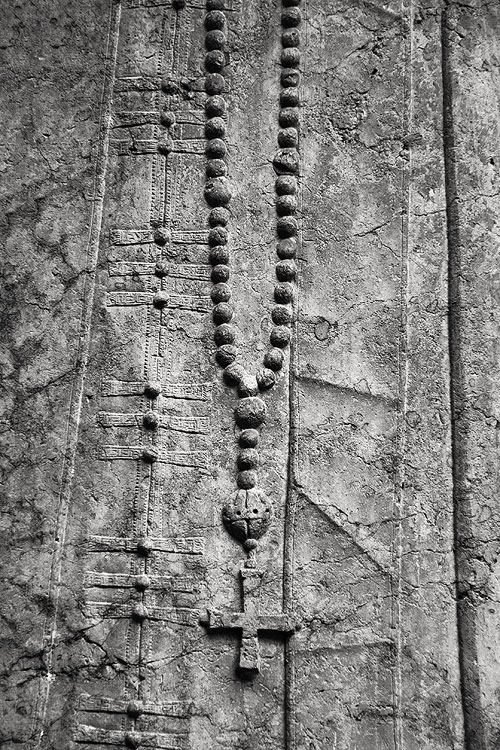

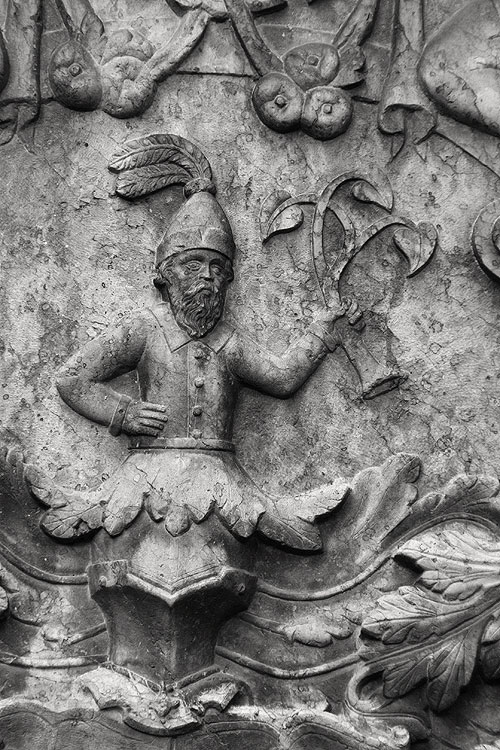

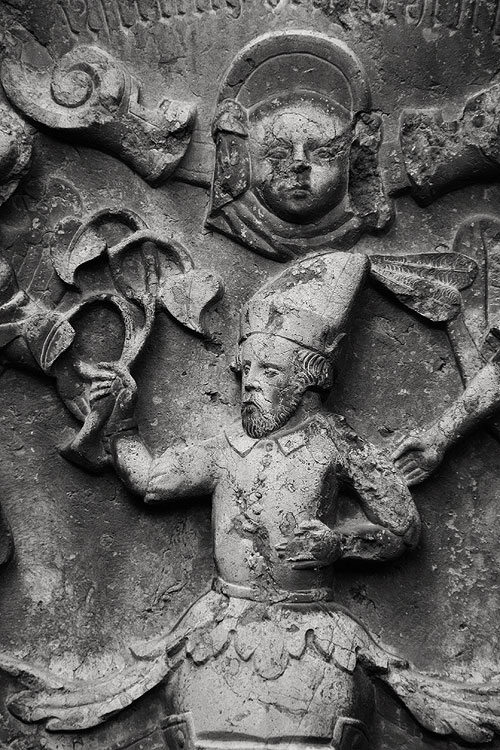

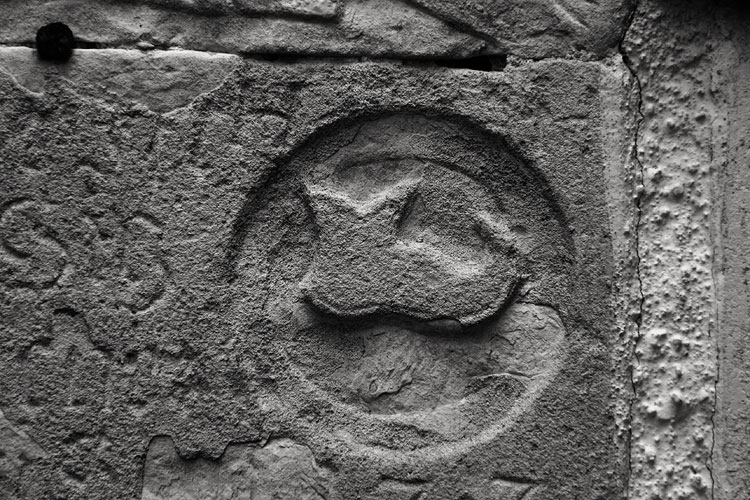

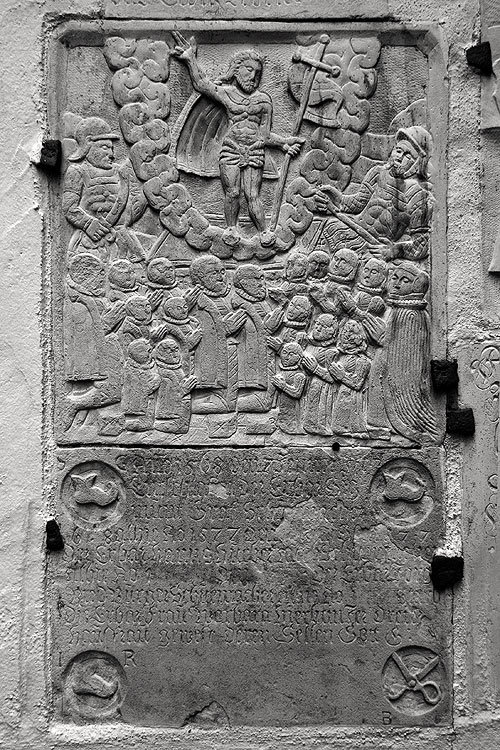

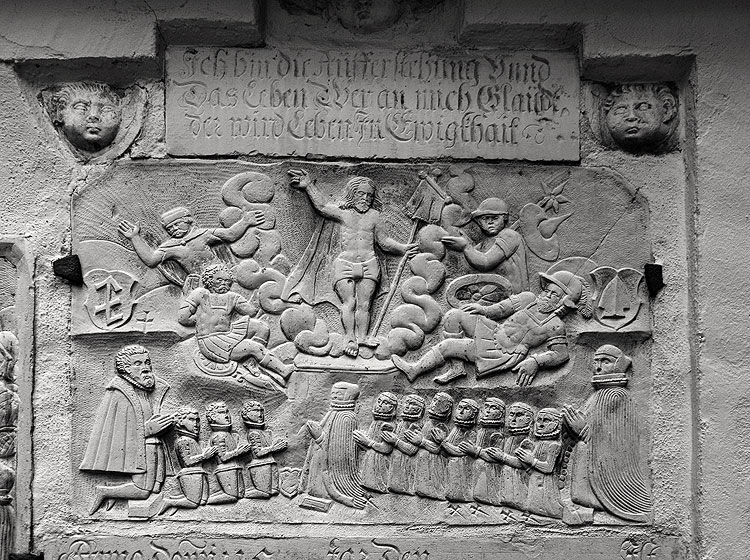

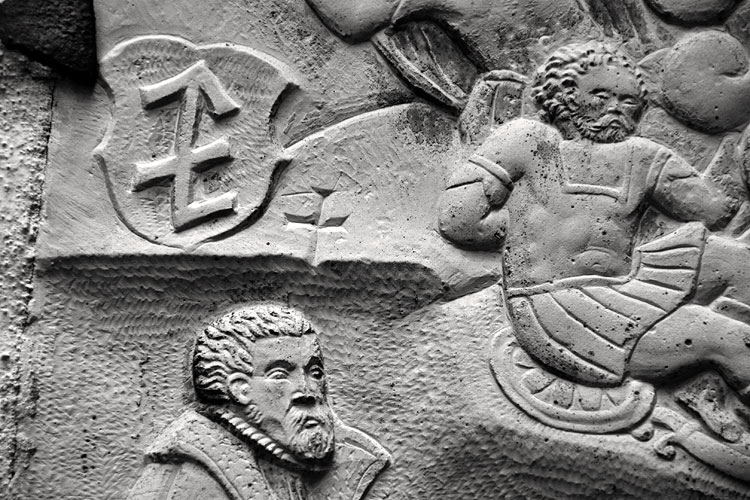

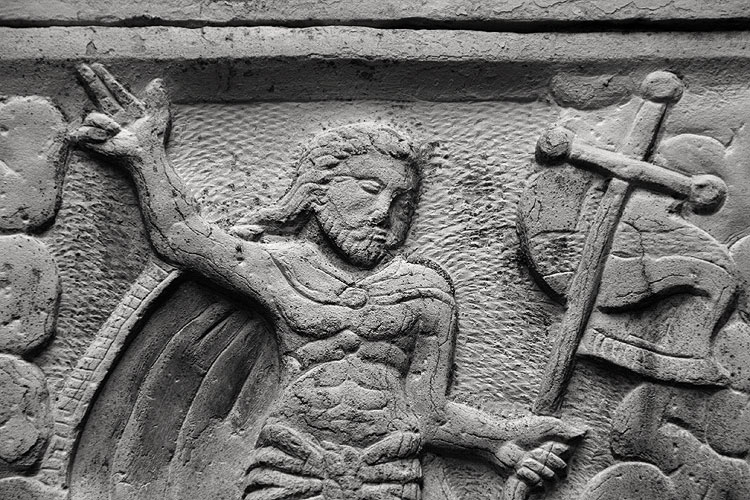

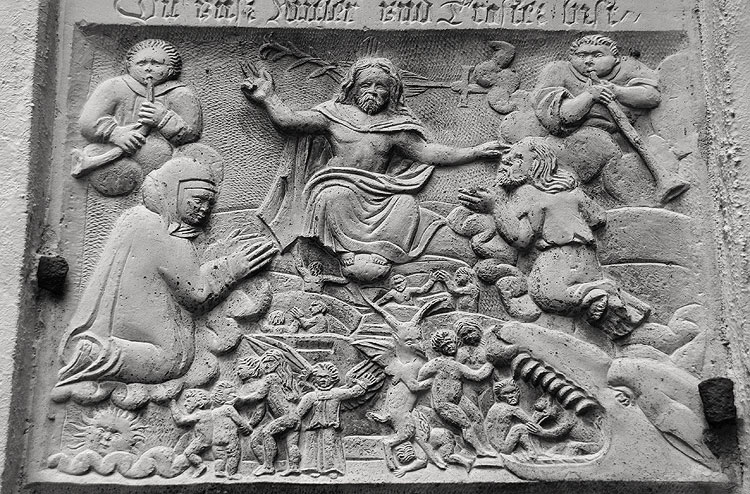

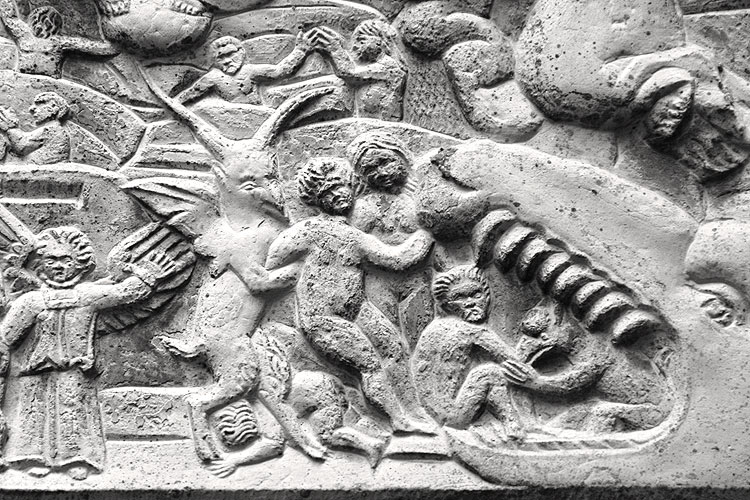

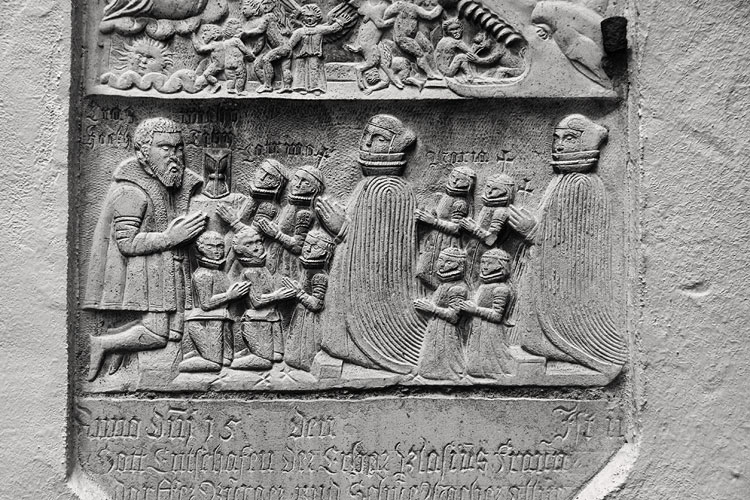

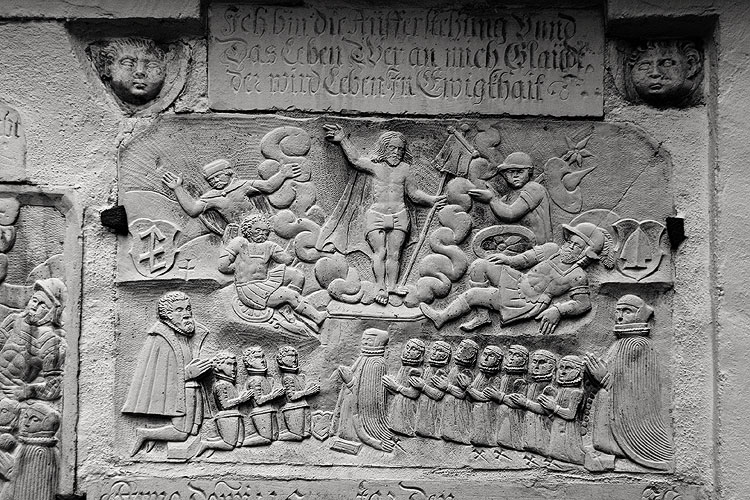

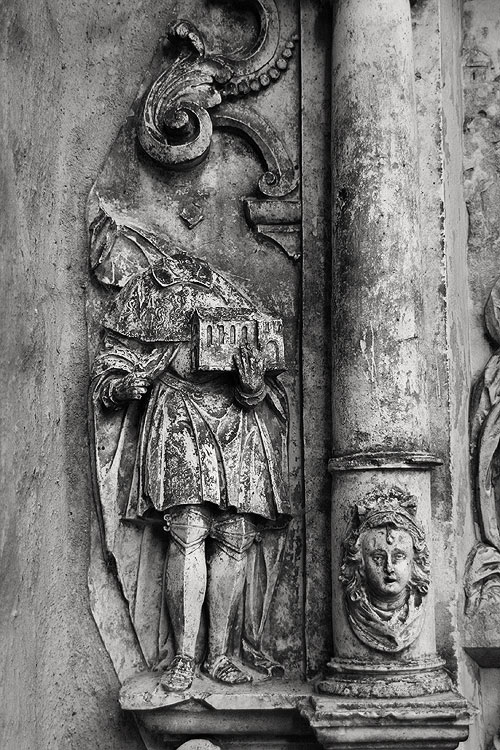

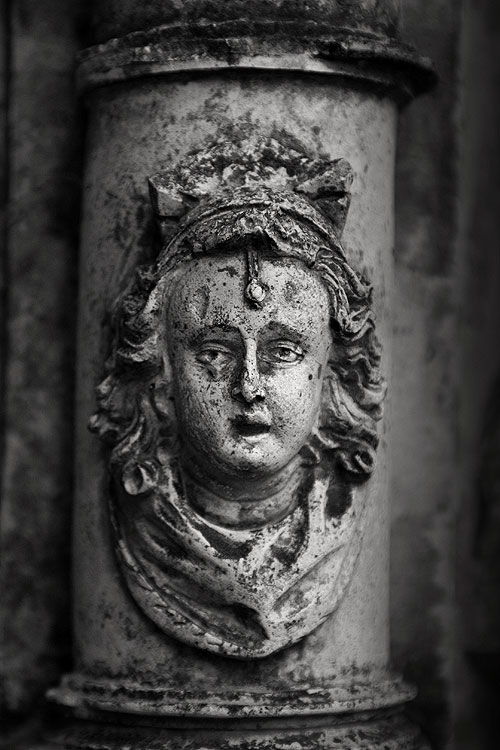

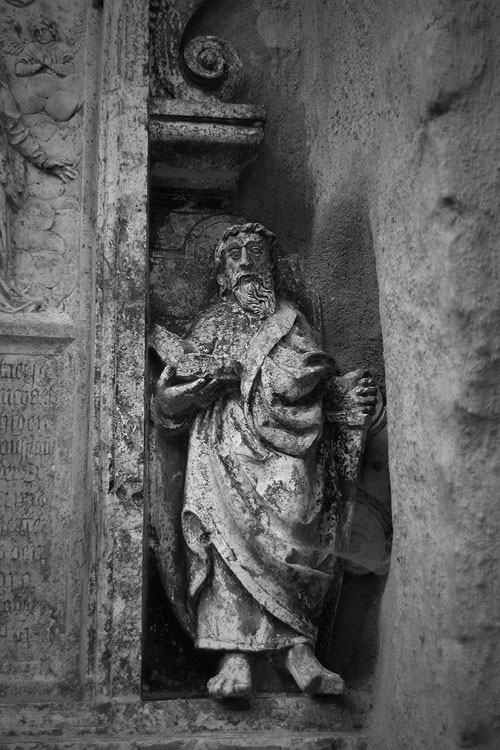

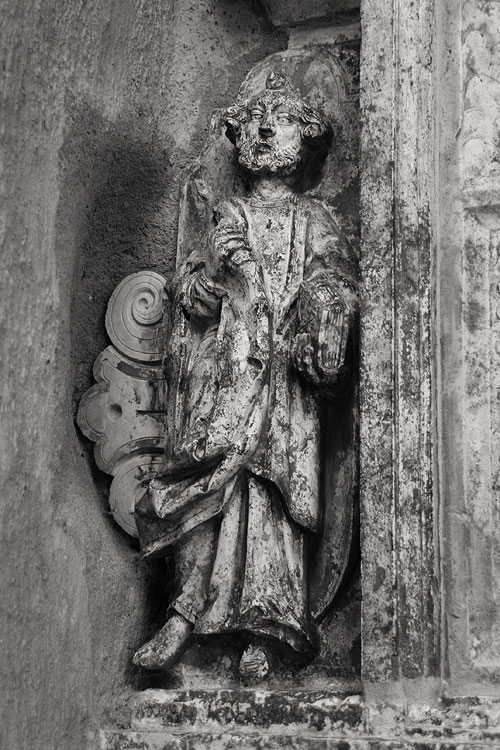

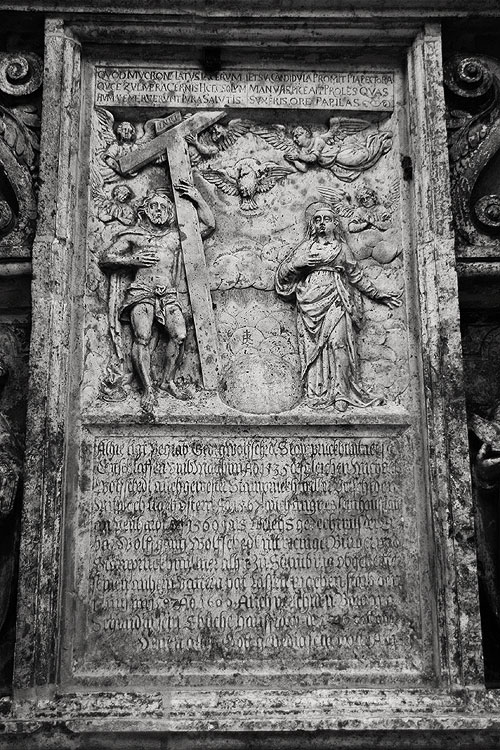

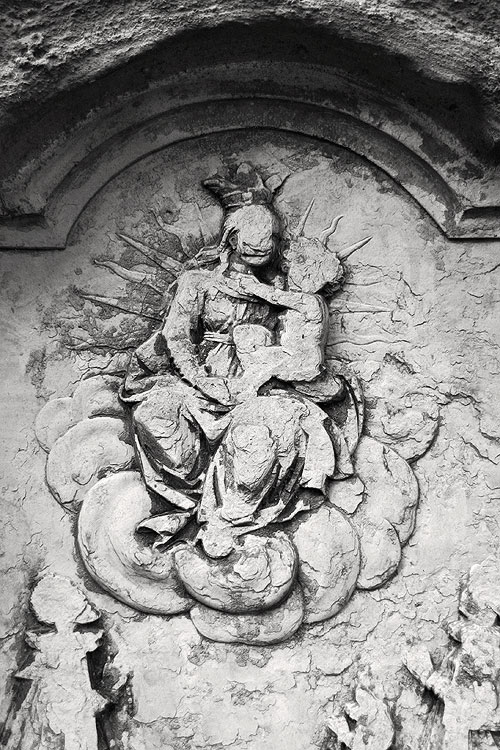

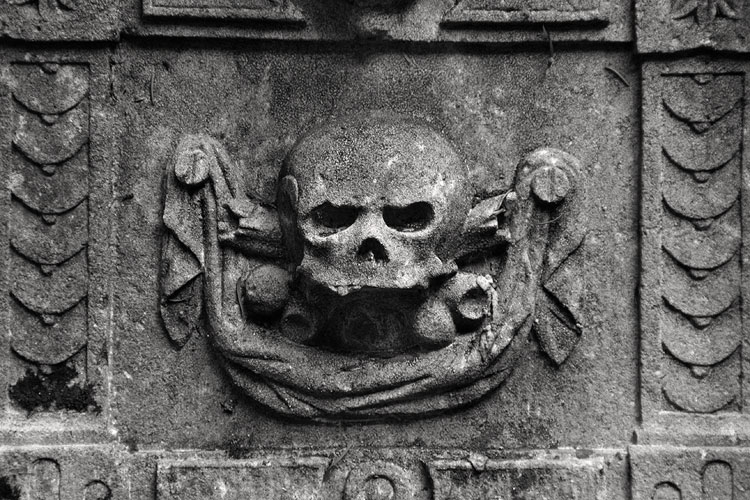

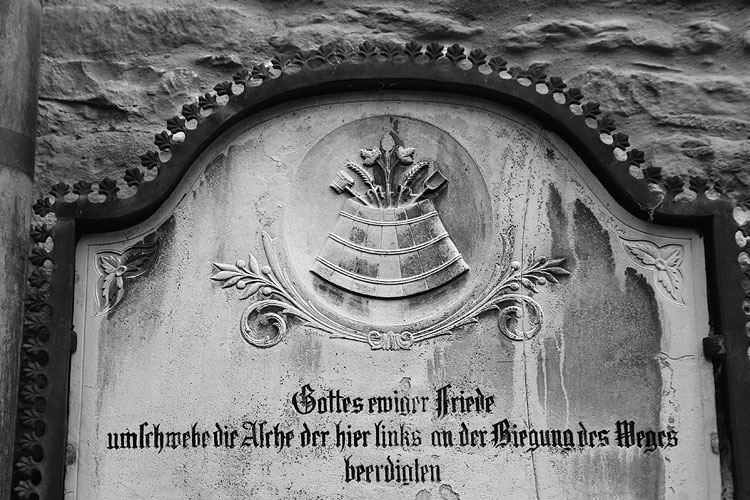

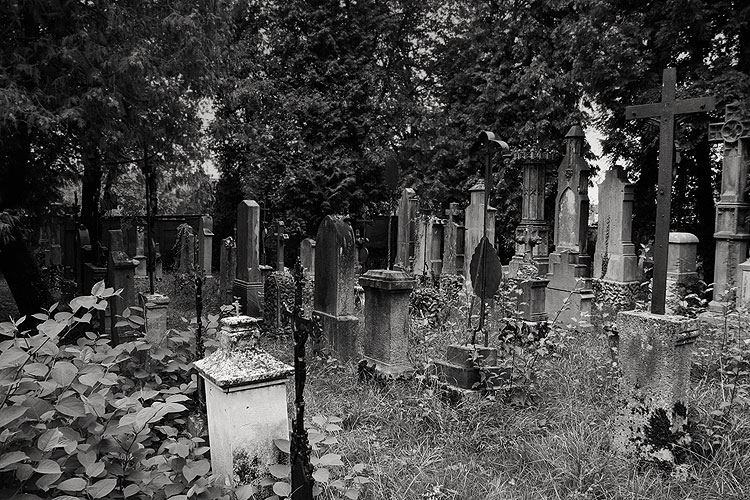

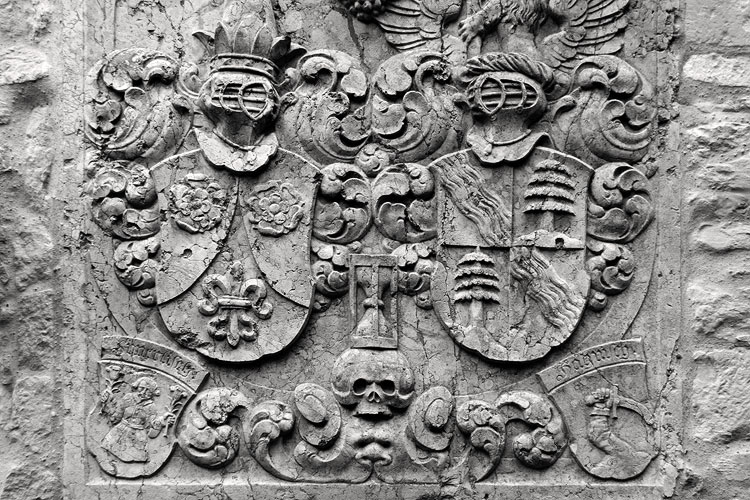

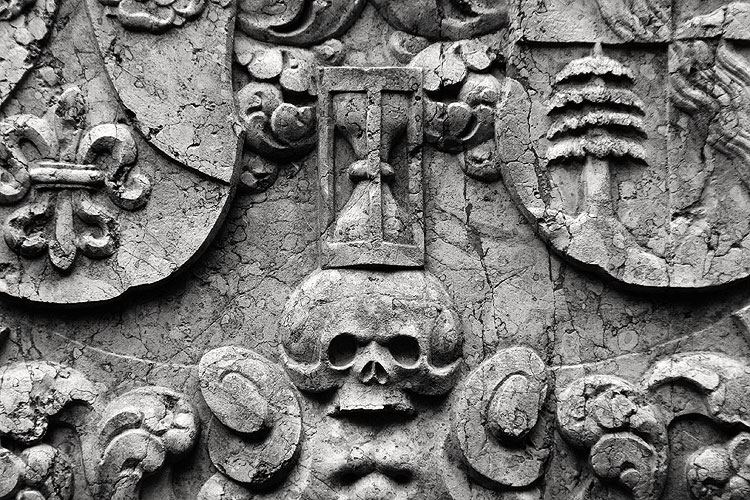

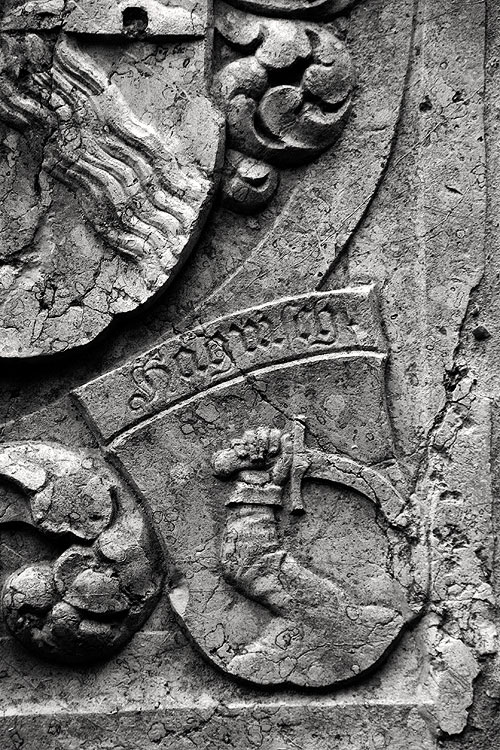

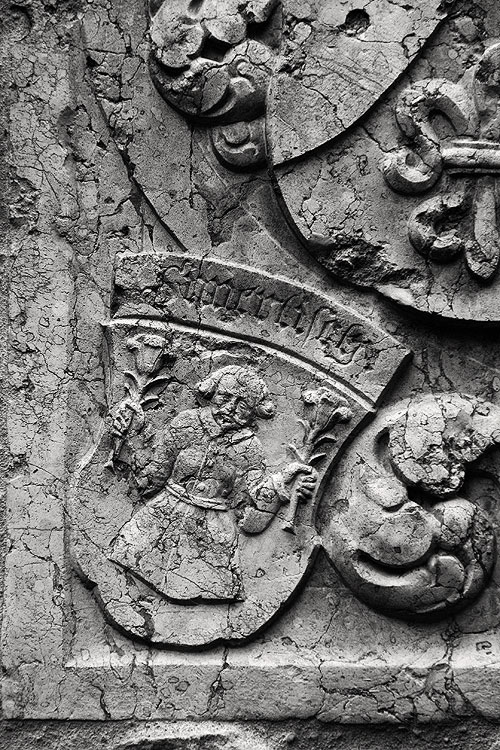

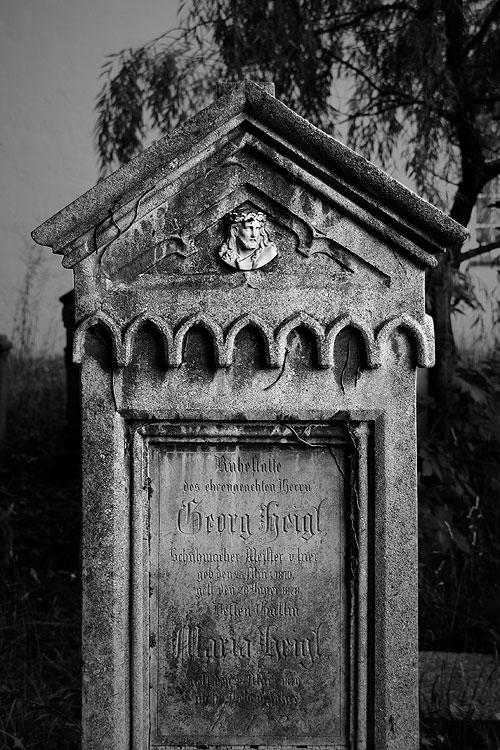

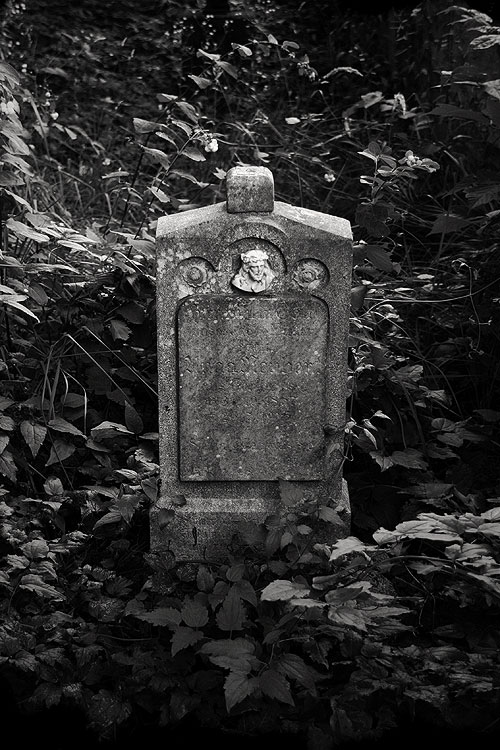

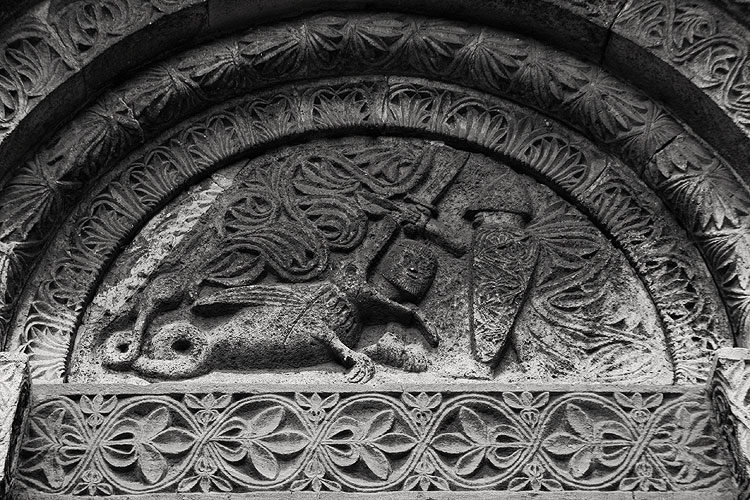

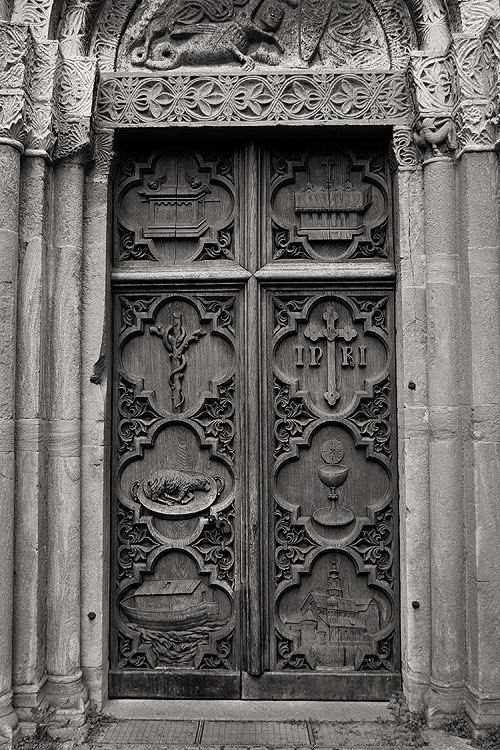

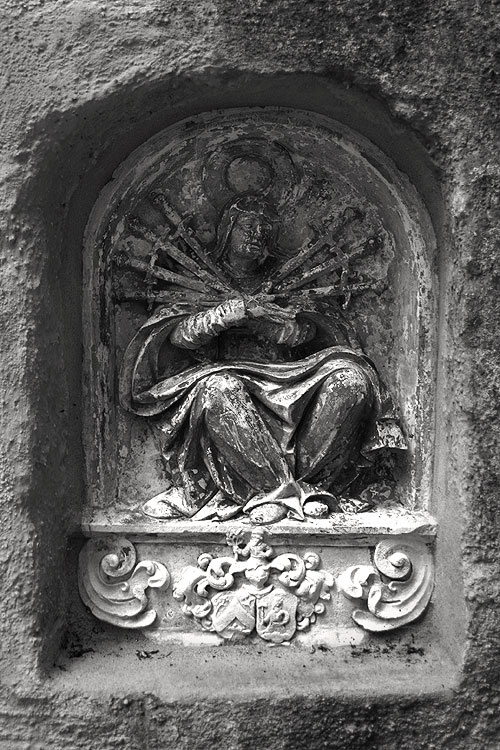

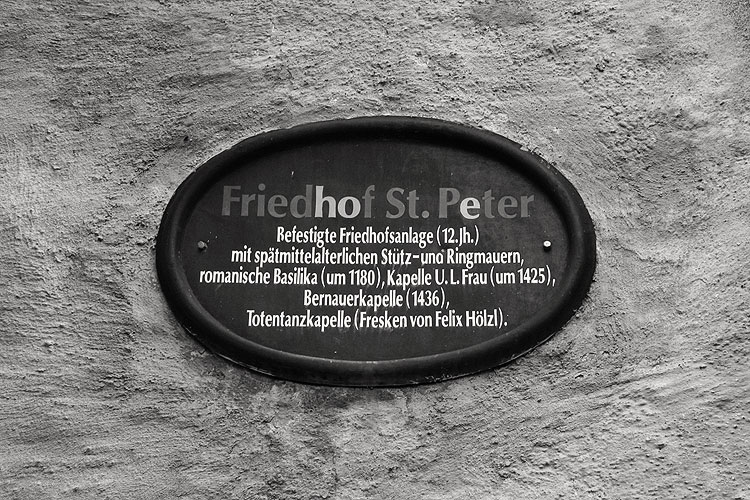
