= St. Peter (disambiguation) =

Saint Peter was one of the Twelve Apostles of Jesus Christ and one of the first leaders of the early Christian Church.

St. Peter or St. Peter's may also refer to:

== Places ==
=== Australia ===
- St Peters, a suburb of Sydney, New South Wales

=== Canada ===
- St. Peter's, Nova Scotia
- Rural Municipality of St. Peter No. 369, Saskatchewan

=== Europe ===
- St. Peter (Graz), Austria
- Sveti Petar u Šumi (Saint Peter in the Woods), Istria, Croatia
- St Peter, Jersey, Channel Islands
- Sint Pieter, Maastricht, Netherlands
- Saint Petersburg, Russia
- St. Peter, Switzerland, Graubunden (Grisons) canton
- St Albans St Peter, Hertfordshire, England

=== United States ===
- St. Petersburg, Florida
- St. Peter, Illinois
- St. Peter, Kansas
- St. Peter, Minnesota
- St. Peters, Missouri
- St. Peter, Wisconsin

== Other ==
- St. Peter (rugby ground), a rugby ground in Jersey
- St. Peter (shipwreck), an 1873 schooner that sank in Lake Ontario
- "St. Peter" (song)
- St. Peter Stiftskulinarium, a restaurant in Salzburg, Austria

== See also ==
- Saint Peter (disambiguation)
- San Pedro (disambiguation)
- Sankt Peter (disambiguation)
- St. Peter's (disambiguation)
- St. Peter's Abbey (disambiguation)
- St. Peter's Basilica (disambiguation)
- St. Peter's Bridge, Ljubljana, Slovenia
- St Peter's Bridge, Burton upon Trent, England
- St. Peter's Cathedral (disambiguation)
- St. Peter's Church (disambiguation)
- St. Peter's College (disambiguation)
- St. Peter's fish, a common name for over a hundred cichlid fish species found in the Sea of Galilee
- St. Peter's keys, a device used for lifting blocks of stone
- St Peter's School (disambiguation)
- St. Peter's Square (disambiguation)
- Saint-Pierre (disambiguation)
- San Pietro (disambiguation)
