= St Peter's School =

St. Peter's School or St. Peter School may refer to several educational establishments:

== Australia ==
- St Peter's College, Adelaide, a private R-12 boys' school in Hackney, Adelaide, South Australia
- St Peter's Girls' School, a private R-12 girls' school in Stonyfell, Adelaide, South Australia
- St Peters Public School, St Peters, New South Wales
- St Peter's Woodlands Grammar School, a private primary school in Glenelg, South Australia

== Canada ==
- St Peter Catholic School, Guelph, Ontario
- St. Peter Catholic High School, Orléans, Ontario
- St. Peter Catholic Secondary School, Peterborough, Ontario
- Saint Peter's School (Brantford, Ontario)
- St. Peter's Catholic Secondary School, Barrie, Ontario

== Ghana ==
- St. Peter's Boys Senior High School, Nkwatia Kwahu

== Hong Kong ==
- St. Peter's Secondary School - 聖伯多祿中學, Aberdeen, Hong Kong
- St. Peter's Catholic Primary School, Aberdeen Island, Hong Kong
- Aberdeen St. Peter's Catholic Primary School, Shek Pai Wan Estate, Aberdeen, Hong Kong
- Sheng Kung Hui St. Peter's Primary School, Hong Kong - 聖公會聖彼得小學, Hill Road, Shek Tong Tsui, Hong Kong

== India ==
- St. Peter's College, Agra, Uttar Pradesh
- St. Peters School, Kadayiruppu, Kerala
- St. Peter's School, Mumbai, Maharashtra
- St. Peter's School, Panchgani, Maharashtra

== Ireland ==
- St Peter's Community School, Cork, Ireland

== Myanmar/Burma ==
- St Peter's High School, Mandalay

== New Zealand ==
- St Peter's School, Cambridge

== Russia ==
- Saint Peter's School (Saint Petersburg) (Petrischule)

== Spain ==
- St. Peter's School, Barcelona, Spain

== United Kingdom ==
=== England ===
- St Peter's School, York
- St Peter's School, Huntingdon, Cambridgeshire
- St. Peter's College, Radley, Oxford
- St Peter's Roman Catholic High School, Manchester
- St Peter's School, Kettering
- St Peter's School, Weston-super-Mare, a defunct boarding school attended by author Roald Dahl
- St Peter's Middle School, Old Windsor
- St Peter's Catholic School, Bournemouth
- St Peter's Catholic School, Guildford
- St Peter's Catholic School, Solihull
- St Peter's Catholic High School, Wigan, Greater Manchester
- St Peter's Collegiate Academy, Wolverhampton
- St Peter's High School, Burnham-on-Crouch

=== Northern Ireland ===
- St. Peter's Primary School, Charlemont, Charlemont, County Armagh, Northern Ireland

=== Scotland ===
- St Peter's Roman Catholic Primary School, Aberdeen

== United States ==
- St. Peter High School (Minnesota), St. Peter, Minnesota
- St. Peter's Preparatory School, New Jersey
- St. Peter's High School (Mansfield, Ohio), Mansfield, Ohio
- St. Peter's Boys High School, New York City
- Saint Peter-Marian High School, Worcester, Massachusetts
- Sanford-Brown College - St. Peters, St Peters, Missouri
- St. Peter's School, Philadelphia
- St. Peter's School, Waldorf, Maryland

== Zimbabwe ==
- Peterhouse Boys' School, named after Saint Peter
- Peterhouse Girls' School, named after Saint Peter

== See also ==
- St. Peter Catholic School (disambiguation)
- St Peter's Catholic School (disambiguation)
- St. Peter's Secondary School (disambiguation)
- St. Peter's College (disambiguation)
- St. Peter's Primary School (disambiguation)
- St Peter Chanel School (disambiguation)
