= St. Peter's =

St. Peter's or similar terms may mean:

== Religious institutions ==
- St. Peter's Basilica, Vatican City, within Rome, Italy
  - Old St. Peter's Basilica, the building that once stood on the spot where the Basilica of Saint Peter stands today in Rome
- St. Peter's Abbey (disambiguation), various
- St. Peter's Cathedral (disambiguation), various
- St. Peter's Church (disambiguation), various

== Places ==
=== Australia ===
- St Peters, New South Wales, a suburb of Sydney
- St Peters, South Australia

=== Canada ===
- St. Peter's, Nova Scotia
- St. Peters Canal, Cape Breton Island

=== Channel Islands ===
- St Peter's, Guernsey

=== Ireland ===
- St. Peters, County Roscommon, a civil parish in County Roscommon

=== Malta ===
- St. Peters, a hamlet in Żabbar, Malta.

=== Switzerland ===
- St. Peter's Island, in Lake Biel

=== United Kingdom ===
- St Peters (Enfield ward), London, England
- St Peter's (Islington ward), London, England
- St Peter's and Canalside (ward), Islington, London, England
- St Peters (Kettering ward), Northamptonshire, England
- St. Peter's (Manchester ward), Manchester, England
- St Peter's (Tameside ward), Greater Manchester, England
- St Peter's (1978 Tower Hamlets ward), London, England
- St Peter's (2014 Tower Hamlets ward), renamed Bethnal Green West in 2022, London, England
- St Peters, Thanet, Kent, England
- St Peter's (Wolverhampton ward), West Midlands, England
- St Peter the Great, Worcester, also called St Peter's, England
- St Peter's College, Saltley
- St Peter's Church, Wolverhampton

=== United States ===
- St. Peters, Missouri, a city
- Saint Peter's Village, Chester County, Pennsylvania

== Educational institutions ==
- St Peter's College (disambiguation)
- St Peter's School (disambiguation)
- Saint Peter's University, a Jesuit university in Jersey City, New Jersey
- St Peters Lutheran College, a private high school in Brisbane, Queensland, Australia
- St Peter's Academy, a secondary school in Stoke-on-Trent, Staffordshire, England
- St Peter's Catholic College, South Bank, a secondary school in South Bank, North Yorkshire, England
- St Peter's Collegiate Girls' School, a private school in Adelaide, South Australia
- St Peter's College, Auckland, a boys' secondary school in Auckland, New Zealand
- St Peter's, Sunderland, a university campus in England

== People ==
- Crispian St. Peters (1939–2010), British singer, best known for his hit single "The Pied Piper"

== Railway stations ==
- St. Peters railway station, Newcastle upon Tyne, closed
- St Peter's Metro station, Sunderland, Tyne and Wear

== Others ==
- St. Peter's Colony, a British colony off the coast of Newfoundland, which existed between 1713 and 1815. Today, it is part of the French territory of Saint Pierre and Miquelon
- St. Peter's Brewery, a brewery in Suffolk, England
- St. Peter's College Boat Club, Oxford
- St. Peter's keys, a three-legged Lewis, used to lift large stones
- Saint Peter's Peacocks, athletic teams of Saint Peter's University
- St. Peters RFC, rugby union team from the town of Roath, Cardiff, South Wales, UK
- Saint Peter's University Hospital, New Brunswick, New Jersey, United States
- St. Peter's fish, a name given to certain species of tilapia

== See also ==
- St. Peter's Church (disambiguation)
- St. Peter (disambiguation)
