= St. Peter's Primary School =

St. Peter's Primary School may refer to:

- St. Peter's Primary School, Charlemont, Charlemont, County Armagh, Northern Ireland
- St Peter's RC Primary School, Aberdeen, Scotland
- St Peter's Primary School, Poole, England
- St Peter's Boys School, Stewartville St, Glasgow
- St Peter's Church of England Primary School, Swinton, Salford, England
- St. Peter's Catholic Primary School, Aberdeen Island, Hong Kong
- Aberdeen St. Peter's Catholic Primary School, Shek Pai Wan Estate, Aberdeen, Hong Kong
- S.K.H. St. Peter's Primary School, Hill Road, Shek Tong Tsui, Hong Kong

== See also ==
- St Peter's School (disambiguation)
