= St Peter's Catholic School =

St Peter's Catholic School may refer to:

- St Peter's Catholic School, Bournemouth, a secondary school in Bournemouth, Dorset, England
- St Peter's Catholic School, Guildford, a secondary school in Guildford, Surrey, England
- St Peter's Catholic School, Solihull, a secondary school in Solihull, West Midlands, England
- St. Peter's Catholic School (Pine Bluff, Arkansas), an elementary school in operation 1889–1975 and 1985–2012
- St. Peter's Secondary School (Hong Kong), a Catholic school in Aberdeen, Hong Kong, Hong Kong
- St. Peter's Catholic Primary School, Aberdeen Island, Hong Kong Hong Kong
- Aberdeen St. Peter's Catholic Primary School, Shek Pai Wan Estate, Aberdeen, Hong Kong

== See also ==
- St. Peter Catholic School (disambiguation)
- St Peter's School (disambiguation)
