= Saint Peter (disambiguation) =

Saint Peter was one of the original Christian apostles and first Pope of the Catholic Church, although there are many other saints named Peter.

Saint Peter may also refer to:

- Saint Peter, Antigua and Barbuda, parish in Antigua and Barbuda
- Saint Peter, Barbados, parish in the Caribbean island country of Barbados
- Saint Peter, Indiana, unincorporated community in Highland Township, Franklin County, Indiana
- Saint Peter, U.S. Virgin Islands, settlement on the island of Saint Croix in the United States Virgin Islands
- Saint Peter Port, town and one of parishes on the island of Guernsey in the Channel Islands
- Saint Peter and Saint Paul Archipelago, group of 15 small islets and rocks in the central equatorial Atlantic Ocean
- Saint Peter's Peacocks, team representing Saint Peter's University, Jersey City, New Jersey
- Saint Peter's University, private Jesuit university in Jersey City, New Jersey
- Mary of Saint Peter (1816–1848), Discalced Carmelite nun who lived in Tours, France
- Mount Saint Peter, northern part of a plateau in the Netherlands
- Saint Peters, community located in Chester County, Pennsylvania, United States of America

== Art ==
- Saint Peter (Brunelleschi), sculpture attributed to Filippo Brunelleschi
- Saint Peter, canvas painting by El Greco
- Saint Peter (Grão Vasco), painting by Portuguese artist Grão Vasco
- "Saint Peter" (poem), a poem by Henry Lawson
- Saint Peter (Sinai), a 6th-century Byzantine icon in Saint Catherine's Monastery
- Saint Peter's tomb, site under St. Peter's Basilica that includes several graves
- Church of Saint Peter, church near Antakya (Antioch), Turkey

== Other ==
- Peter (given name), is given name

== See also ==
- St. Peter (disambiguation)
- Saint Peter Parish (disambiguation)
- Cathedral of Saint Peter (disambiguation)
- Saint Peter Island (disambiguation)
- Church of Saint Peter (disambiguation)
