= Merrow, Surrey =

Suburb in Surrey, England

Merrow
- Suburb
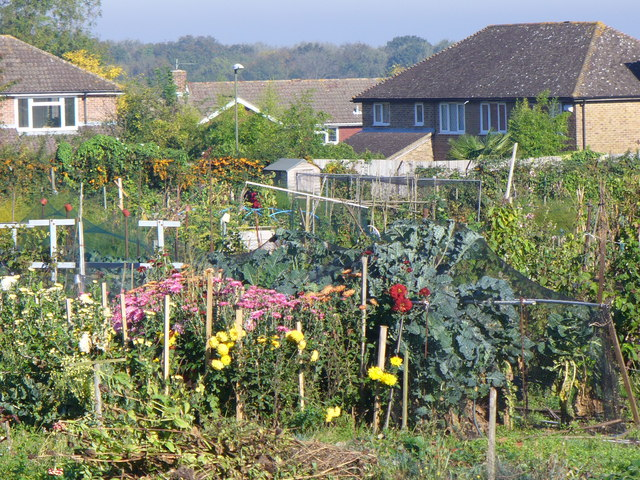
- Allotments and rooftops in Merrow

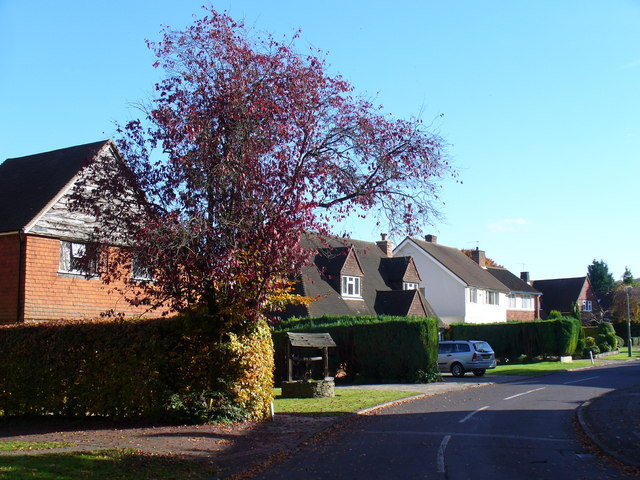
- Tree, hedge and verge-lined street typical of the majority of the streets of Merrow

- Location within Surrey
- Area: 4.41 km^{2} (1.70 sq mi)
- Population: 8,036 (Census 2011. Ward)
  - Density: 1,822/km^{2} (4,720/sq mi)
- Demonym: Merrovian
- OS grid reference: TQ022508
- District: Guildford
- Shire county: Surrey
- Region: South East
- Country: England
- Sovereign state: United Kingdom
- Post town: GUILDFORD
- Postcode district: GU1, GU4
- Dialling code: 01483
- Police: Surrey
- Fire: Surrey
- Ambulance: South East Coast
- UK Parliament: Guildford

Merrow is a suburb in the north-east of Guildford, in Surrey, England. It is 2 miles (3.2 km) from the town's centre, on the edge of the ridge of hills that forms the North Downs. Although now a relatively obscure suburb, the village can trace its origins back many hundreds of years. Merrow is separated from Burpham (to the north-west) by the New Guildford Line, the second railway line between Guildford and London.

== Etymology ==
According to the Institute for Name-Studies, Merrow means 'fat', literally, "probably referring to the high fertility of the land".

== History ==
The village grew up around a crossroads: where what is now the A25, the road between Guildford and Leatherhead, crossed the original road (Merrow Street) from Burpham to Dorking.

The oldest houses in the village can still be seen along these two roads, together with St John's Church and the Horse and Groom, a Grade II listed 17th-century coaching inn next door. The old Dorking road squeezes between the church and the inn, creating a significant bottleneck for modern motor traffic.

To the north is Clandon Park, a 1000-acre (400 hectare) private Grade II Listed agricultural parkland estate that is the seat of the current Earl of Onslow. At the south east corner of Clandon Park are 9 acres of gardens and grounds where Clandon House is located. The mansion house with 7 acres of gardens was gifted to the nation by the Onslow family and is now a National Trust property. The Onslows provided some of the earliest Speakers of the House of Commons, such as Arthur Onslow who held this post through the reign of George II.

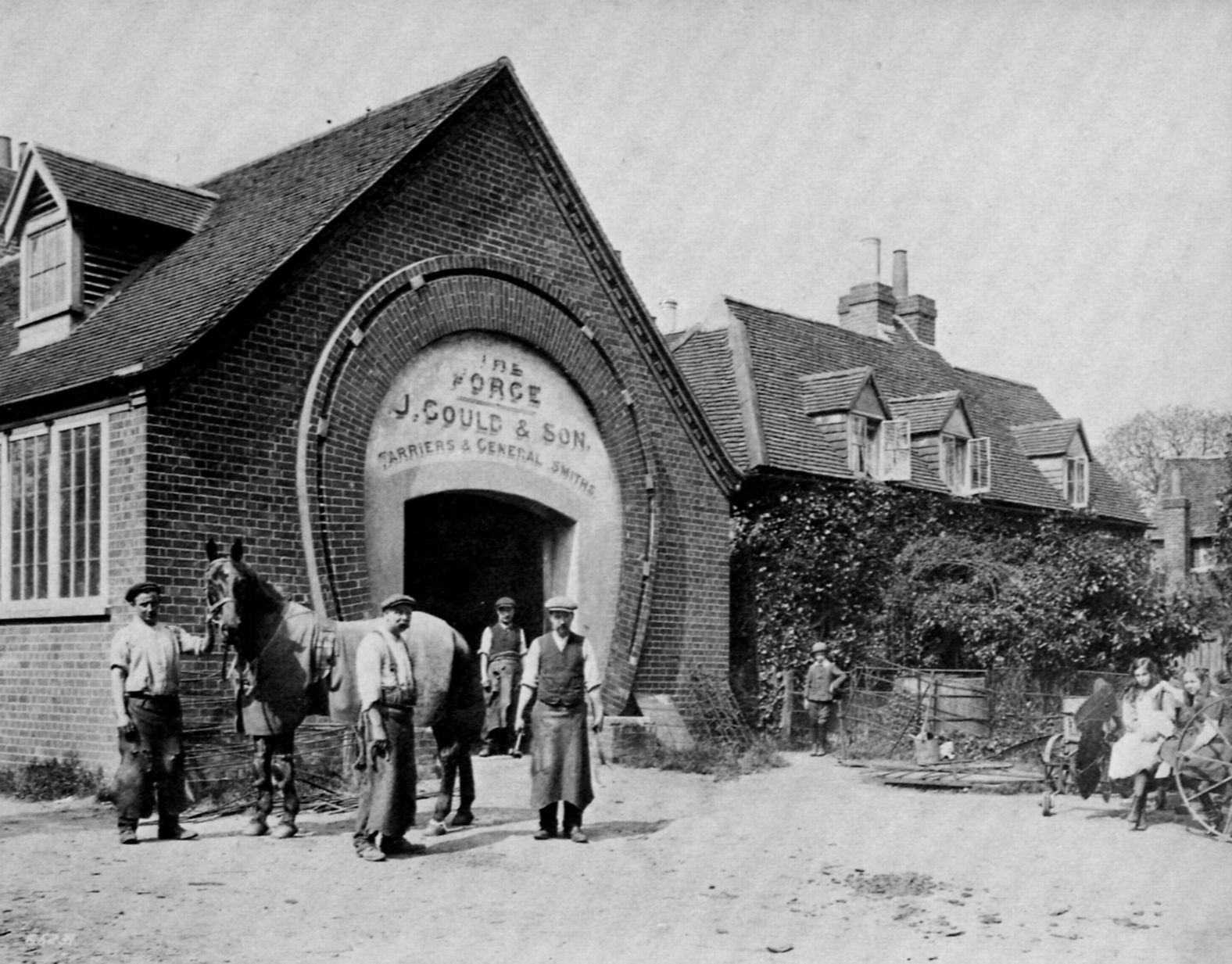
Forge at Merrow by Francis Frith

Merrow remained a relatively small settlement right up to the 1950s, when the Bushy Hill estate was built. This development of several hundred houses was originally all council-owned, but since the 1980s, many have passed into private ownership.

Further expansion occurred in the mid-1980s. In the greenfield site bordered by Burpham, adjacent to the Bushy Hill estate and Clandon Park, the Merrow Park development was built, completely surrounding the old houses on Merrow Street. Merrow Park is often considered a suburb in its own right and has its own shops, school and doctor's surgery.

In 1931 the civil parish had a population of 1690. On 1 April 1933 the parish was abolished and merged with Guildford and West Clandon. It is now in the district of Guildford.

== Schools ==
- Merrow C of E Infant School (ages 4 – 7)
- Merrow Junior School (ages 7 – 11)
- Boxgrove Primary School (ages 4 – 11)
- St Thomas of Canterbury Catholic Primary School (ages 4 – 11)
- St Peter's Catholic School (ages 11 – 18)

== Churches ==
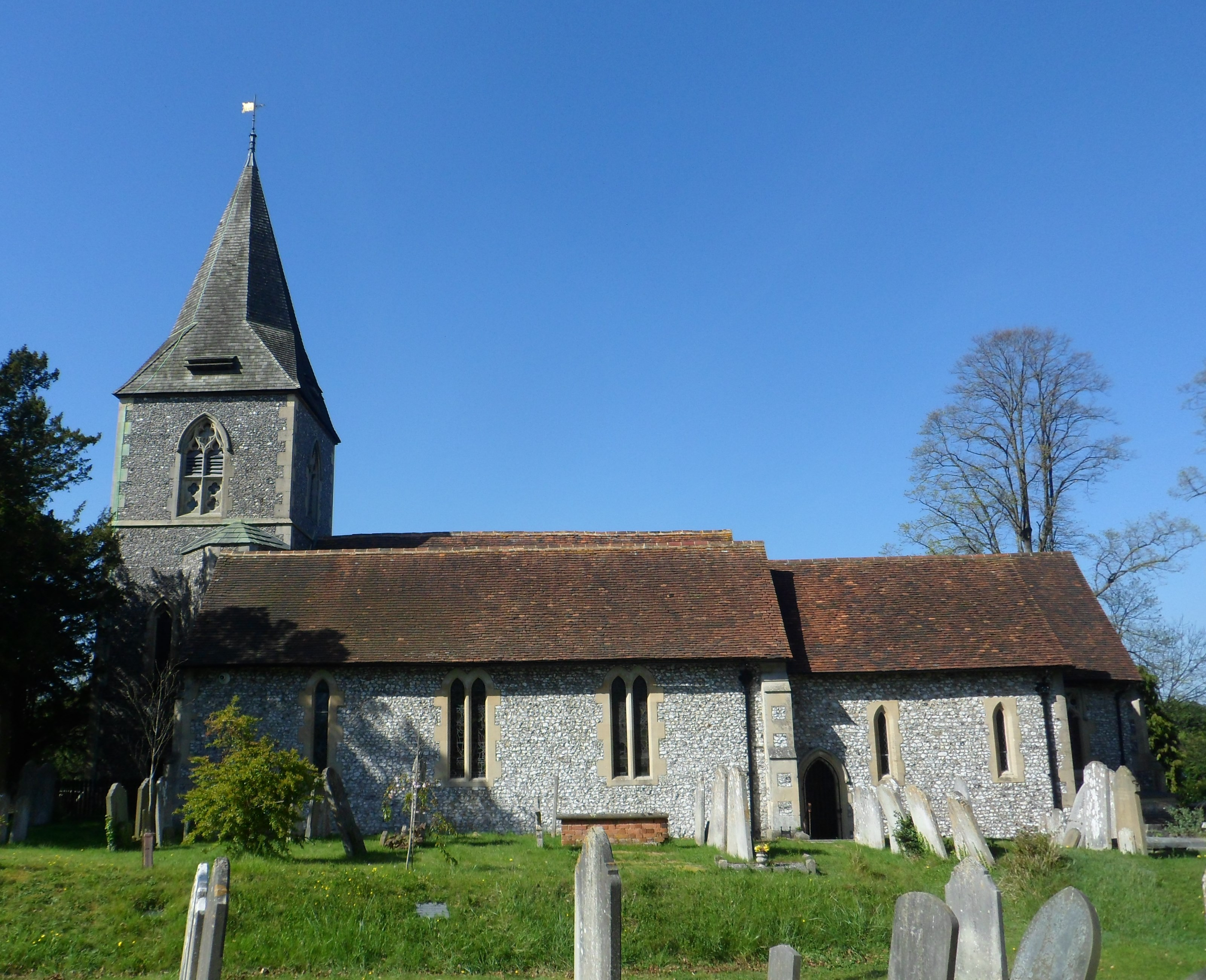
St John's church, viewed from the south (non-road) side.

The parish church of St John the Evangelist was built in the mid 12th century and a few early features have survived later additions, such as a Norman arch and a 13th-century chapel. The church is Grade II listed.

The churchyard is the burial place of the Onslow family. There is a war memorial in the churchyard, dedicated to those who lost their lives in the First and Second World Wars. This was re-dedicated in 2002 following a restoration and research project part-funded by a Heritage Lottery Fund grant. The church hall, The St John's Centre, is a focal point for the community and was reopened in 2001 following a major refurbishing and enlargement project.

There are two other churches in Merrow: Merrow Methodist church and St Pius X Roman Catholic church.

== Sport and leisure ==
Merrow is situated right on the edge of the North Downs. Guildford Golf Club, the oldest Golf Course in Surrey, is located on Merrow Downs. A short walk from Merrow is Newlands Corner, a popular beauty spot in the Surrey Hills Area of Outstanding Natural Beauty.

Merrow has a non-league football club (Merrow F.C.), a tennis club and a cricket club, as well as a fitness club (which was formerly known as "Dragons").

Merrow Dramatic Society has been in existence for over 80 years. Each year, the Society produces two plays, performed at the Electric Theatre in Guildford, and a traditional pantomime, put on at Merrow Village Hall (built 1909). They also take part in Drama Festivals (winning recently at both Guildford and Woking) and host their own variety evenings.

=== Merrow F.C. ===
The non-League football club, Merrow F.C., nicknamed "The Robins", was established in 1922. Their home ground is The Urnfield, Downside Road, in Merrow (51°14′14.72″N 0°32′11.69″W). The club was among the founding members of the Surrey Premier League in 1982.

In the 2012–13 season the club achieved a league-and-cup double when they finished top of the Surrey County Intermediate League (Western) Premier Division, and won the Surrey Intermediate Cup. The club were promoted to the Surrey Elite Intermediate League for the 2013–2014 season.

== Transport ==
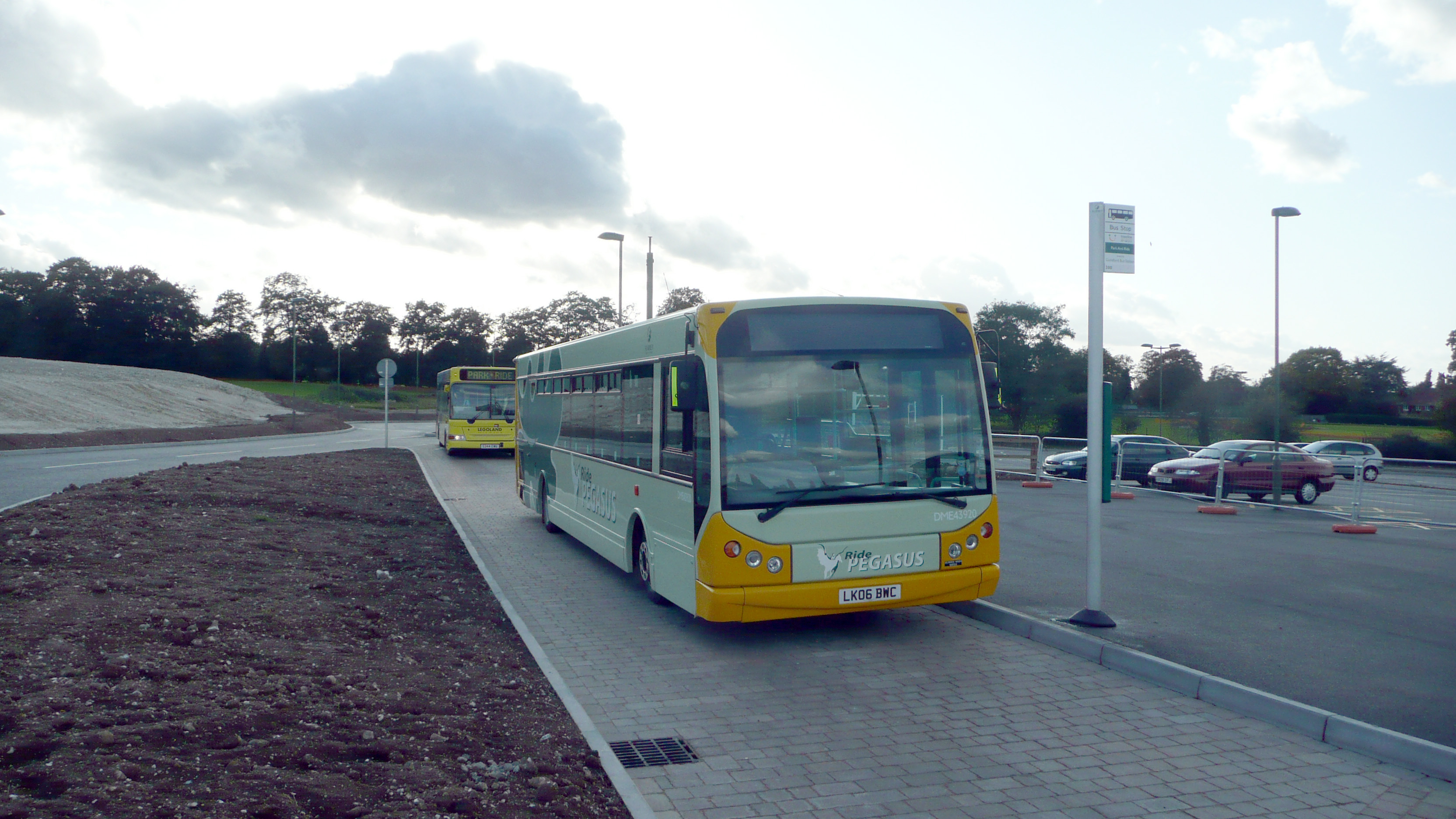
Merrow park and ride.

Merrow is on several bus routes that start or finish in Guildford.

A park and ride facility was built to the east of the village, construction starting in Autumn 2006, which opened on 29 September 2008. This service, operated by Stagecoach South on behalf of Guildford Borough Council and Surrey County Council, was introduced to reduce the traffic levels between Merrow and the town centre.

There have been several proposals to build a railway station on the Guildford to Effingham Junction line, the most probable site being the Surrey County Council depot near Burpham. As yet the funding has not been forthcoming to develop this further, although a feasibility study was carried out. The line serves Clandon railway station, 1 mile (1.6 km) across fields from part of Merrow, and on the same line London Road (Guildford) railway station is a similar distance from western parts of Merrow.

== Literature ==
Merrow Downs in prehistory is the setting for two of the Just So Stories by Rudyard Kipling: "How the First Letter was Written" and "How the Alphabet was Made". Merrow features as a location in Tros of Samothrace by Talbot Mundy.

== See also ==
- Merrow F.C.
