= Sankt Peter =

Sankt Peter may refer to several places in Austria:

- Sankt Peter am Kammersberg, in Styria
- Sankt Peter am Ottersbach, in Styria
- Sankt Peter im Sulmtal, in Styria
- Sankt Peter ob Judenburg, in Styria
- Sankt Peter-Freienstein, in Styria
- Sankt Peter am Hart, in Upper Austria
- Sankt Peter am Wimberg, in Upper Austria
- Aspangberg-Sankt Peter, in Lower Austria
- Sankt Peter in der Au, in Lower Austria
- Sankt Peter, Baden-Württemberg, in Germany
- Sankt Peter-Ording, Schleswig-Holstein, Germany

== See also ==
- St. Peter (disambiguation)
- Saint Peter (disambiguation)
