= Merrow Downs =

Coordinates: 51.2354°N 0.5332°W

- Location within Surrey
- Area: 1.56 km^{2} (0.60 sq mi)
- OS grid reference: TQ033501
- District: Guildford
- Shire county: Surrey
- Region: South East
- Country: England
- Sovereign state: United Kingdom
- Post town: GUILDFORD
- Postcode district: GU
- Police: Surrey
- Fire: Surrey
- Ambulance: South East Coast
- UK Parliament: Guildford

Merrow Downs, in Surrey, England is an area of common land at the edge of the former village of Merrow, now a suburb of Guildford. It forms part of Surrey Hills AONB right on the edge of the ridge of hills that forms the North Downs.

It is owned by Guildford Borough Council, who lease part of the common to Guildford golf club, with the public retaining the right to roam. Most of the common covered by the golf course is chalk downland while other areas are covered by broad leaved woodland. This is predominantly hazel coppice under oak in the older parts of the common, a woodland rich in biodiversity complemented by stands of old yew trees. In the last 100 years the common ceased to be used for grazing and the cutting of hazel, and other tree species such as blackthorn, holly and ash now dominate the landscape, covering areas that were once open grassland.

== Sport ==
Merrow Down was the site of Guildford Bason, a ground used for cricket in the 18th century. Guildford Golf Club has used the site of the former race course since 1888.

== Prisoner of War camp ==
A prisoner of war (POW) camp, known as Work Camp 57, was opened on Merrow Down in April 1942. Initially it held Italian prisoners, but it also held Germans from mid-1945. The final 65 POWs left the camp in April 1948. The camp was taken over by the Guildford Corporation the following month, and the buildings were later used as temporary housing for local people before demolition in the late 1950s.
