= St. Peter's Secondary School =

St. Peter's Secondary School can refer to:

- St. Peter's Secondary School (Peterborough), in Ontario
- St. Peter's Secondary School (Barrie), in Ontario
- St. Peter's Boys Senior High School, Kwahu, Ghana
- St. Peter's Secondary School (Hong Kong), Aberdeen, Hong Kong, Hong Kong

== See also ==
- St Peter's School (disambiguation)
