= St Peter's Seminary =

St. Peter's Seminary may refer to:

- St Peter's Seminary, Bearsden, previously on the site of Bearsden Academy
- St Peter's Seminary, Cardross, Scotland
- St. Peter's Seminary (Diocese of London, Ontario), Canada

== See also ==
- St Peter's College (disambiguation)
