= Cathédrale Saint-Pierre =

Cathédrale Saint-Pierre may refer to:

- Cathédrale Saint-Pierre d'Angoulême in Angoulême
- Cathédrale Saint-Pierre d'Annecy in Annecy
- Cathédrale Saint-Pierre de Beauvais in Beauvais
- Cathédrale Saint-Pierre de Condom in Condom, Gers
- Cathédrale Saint-Pierre de Rennes in Rennes
- Cathédrale Saint-Pierre de Vannes in Vannes, Brittany
- Cathédrale Saint-Pierre et Saint-Paul de Nantes in Nantes
- Saint-Pierre Cathedral in Saint-Pierre, Saint Pierre and Miquelon
- St. Pierre Cathedral in Geneva

== See also ==
- St. Peter's Cathedral (disambiguation)
