= Saint Pierre Island (disambiguation) =

Saint Pierre Island is part of the Territorial Collectivity of Saint-Pierre and Miquelon, a self-governing territorial overseas collectivity of France, situated in the northwestern Atlantic Ocean near Newfoundland and Labrador, Canada.

Saint Pierre Island (French: Île Saint-Pierre) may also refer to:

- St. Pierre Island, Farquhar, Seychelles
- St. Pierre Island, Praslin, Seychelles

== See also ==
- Saint Peter Island (disambiguation)
- St. Peter's Island, Switzerland
