= St Peter's College =

St, St. or Saint Peter's College may refer to:

== Places of education sorted by location ==
=== Australia ===
- St Peter's Catholic College, Tuggerah, New South Wales
- St Peter's College, Adelaide, South Australia
- St Peters Lutheran College, Brisbane, Queensland

=== Canada ===
- St Peter's College, Muenster, see Muenster, Saskatchewan

=== England ===
- Peterhouse, Cambridge, sometimes known as St Peter's College
- St Peter's Catholic College, South Bank, North Yorkshire
- St Peter's, Sunderland, part of the City of Sunderland College
- St Peter's College, Oxford
- St Peter's College, Radley (see Radley College), a secondary school near Oxford
- St Peter's College, Saltley
- St Peter's College, Chelmsford, Essex
- St Peter's Collegiate Academy, Wolverhampton, West Midlands

=== India ===
- St. Peter's College, Agra

=== Ireland ===
- St. Peter's College, Dunboyne
- St Peter's College, Wexford

=== New Zealand ===
- Hato Petera College, Auckland
- St Peter's College, Auckland
- St Peter's College, Gore
- St Peter's College, Palmerston North

=== Philippines ===
- St. Peter's College, Iligan City

=== Sri Lanka ===
- St Peter's College, Colombo, a primary and secondary school
  - St Peter's College, Gampaha, a branch of the school in Colombo
- St. Peter's College, Negombo

=== South Africa ===
- St Peter's College, Johannesburg

=== United States ===
- Saint Peter's University, a Jesuit university in Jersey City, New Jersey, formerly known as Saint Peter's College prior to August 2012

== See also ==
- St. Peter (disambiguation)
- St. Peter's (disambiguation)
- St Peter's School (disambiguation)
