= St. Peter's Square (disambiguation) =

St. Peter's Square is a plaza located in front of St. Peter's Basilica in the Vatican City.

St. Peter's Square may also refer to:

- St Peter's Square, London
- St Peter's Square, Manchester, England
  - St Peter's Square tram stop in Manchester
  - One St Peter's Square, a high-rise office building in Manchester
  - Two St Peter's Square, a high-rise office building in Manchester
  - 3 St Peter's Square, a high-rise hotel and aparthotel in Manchester
- St. Peter's Square (Fort Wayne, Indiana)
