= Paliwal Park =

Park in Agra, India

Coordinates: 27°12′2″N 78°0′51″E

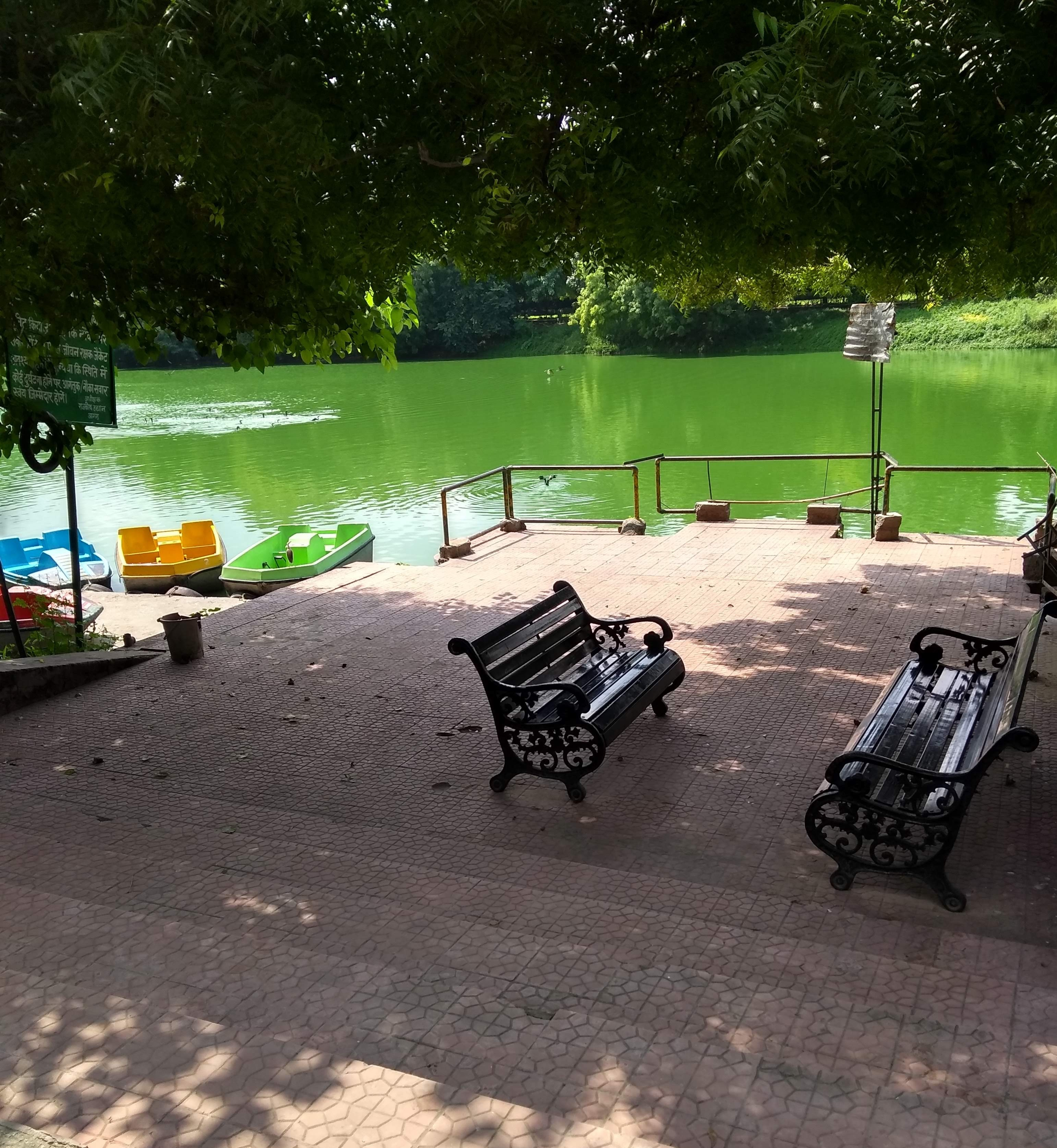
Boats at the lake in Paliwal Park.

K.D.Paliwal Park also known as Hewitt Park is located in the heart of Agra, India. It is spread over an area of around 70 acres (280,000 m^{2}). Kd Paliwal Park, one of the top attractions in Agra, is where visitors go to unwind and spend some quiet time in a peaceful environment. It attracts many tourists because it is in the centre of the city, close to a financial sector. The park is home to a vast variety of plants and animals as well as a stunning lake that is surrounded by lush vegetation. The park was originally known as Hewitt Park when it was constructed during the British era, but it was later renamed in honour of Shri Krishna Dutta Paliwal, the first finance minister of Uttar Pradesh. Tourists can rent boats on the lake. The area is buzzing with educational energy thanks to the numerous colleges around.

== Location ==
Paliwal Park links the residential areas of Vijay Nagar and Gandhi Nagar to the financial Hub of the city i.e. Sanjay Place. To the north is Gandhi Nagar, to the west is Wazirpura/Sanjay Place, to the east is Vijay Nagar and to the south is Ghatia. A motorable path runs through the middle of the Paliwal Park.

== History ==
Paliwal Park, during the British Raj was known as Hewitt Park, is now renamed in memory of Shri Krishna Datta Paliwal, Who was the first finance minister of Uttar Pradesh, when Shri Govind Ballabh Pant was the Chief Minister of U.P State.

== Surroundings ==
Paliwal Park is surrounded by educational institutes including the Dr. Bhimrao Ambedkar University (formerly Agra University), St. Peter's College, St. Patrick's Junior College, and Mufeed E Aam Inter College.

John's Public Library, also known as the Agra Municipal Library, is located there, and there is a small lake where one can go boating.

== See also ==
- St. Peter's College, Agra
- Dr. Bhim Rao Ambedkar University
