= St. Peter Catholic School =

St. Peter Catholic School may refer to:

- St. Peter Catholic High School, Ottawa, Canada
- St Peter Catholic School, Guelph, Ontario, Canada

== See also ==
- St. Peter's RC School (disambiguation)
- St Peter's School (disambiguation)
