= Sanjay Place =

Coordinates: 27°11′23″N 78°0′14″E

- Business District
- Interactive map of Sanjay Place
- Country: India
- State or Union Territory: Uttar Pradesh (UP)
- City/Metro/Town: Agra

Sanjay Place, is a Business District in Agra, Uttar Pradesh, India. It is a big market of electrical, communication, electronic items. It also has multiple government offices of Agra district like income tax office, LIC district quarters etc. It's a good place for food lovers due to multiple chain restaurant and small eateries present there.

== History ==
The area which is now known as Sanjay Place was actually a central Jail. Then in 1976 during Indira Gandhi's emergency (1975–77) saw the shifting of the Central Jail to a new site outside the city periphery. The space vacated has now been used for the Sanjay Place commercial complexes. The name Sanjay is after Indira Gandhi's son who was instrumental in this shift.

== Location ==
Sanjay place is located between the Paliwal Park and M G Road. It is close to the Shah Market which is the biggest electronic market in Agra. It is also quite close to Raja Ki Mandi Railway station and the civil court. There is a branch of the HDFC bank in the area.
