= Saint Peter Parish =

Saint Peter Parish can refer to:

- Saint Peter Parish, Antigua and Barbuda
- Saint Peter Parish, Barbados
- Saint Peter Parish, Dominica
- Saint Peter Parish, Montserrat
