= Three St Peter's Square =

High-rise hotel and aparthotel in Manchester, England

3 St Peter's Square
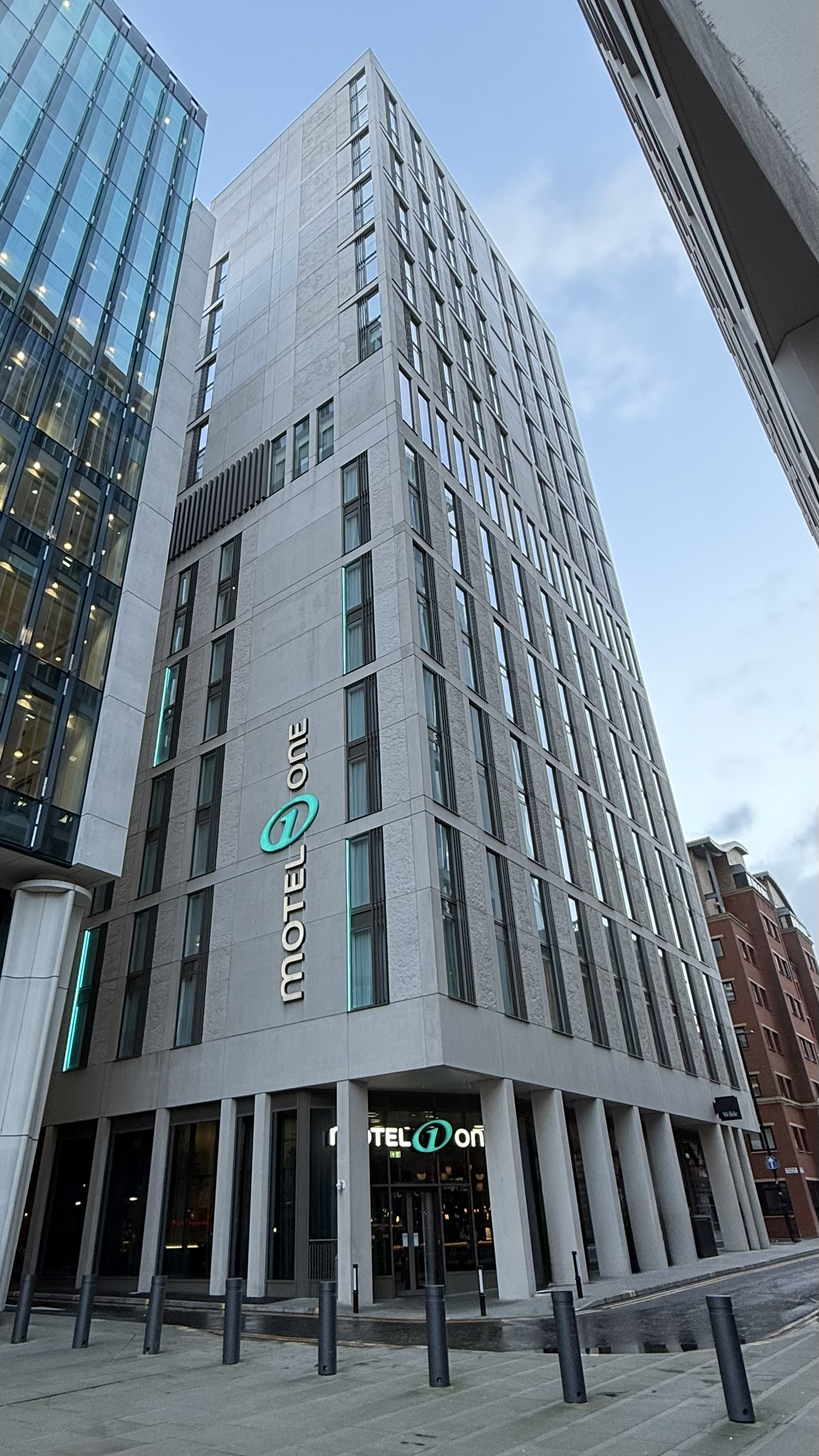
- 3 St Peter's Square

- Location within Greater Manchester

General information
- Type: High-rise hotel and aparthotel
- Architectural style: Modern classical
- Location: Dickinson Street, Manchester, England
- Coordinates: 53.47787°N 2.24244°W
- Construction started: 2017
- Completed: 2022; 4 years ago
- Cost: £50 million
- Landlord: Property Alliance Group

Height
- Height: 72 m (236 ft)

Technical details
- Floor count: 20
- Floor area: 200,000 sq ft (19,000 m^{2})

Design and construction
- Architect: Stephenson Studio
- Other designers: Leach Rhodes Walker
- Main contractor: Russell WBHO

Website
- Motel One Manchester St Peter's Square; Wilde Aparthotels

3 St Peter's Square is a high-rise hotel and aparthotel on Dickinson Street in Manchester city centre, England. Designed by Stephenson Studio with Leach Rhodes Walker as the delivery architect, the building comprises a 256-unit aparthotel operated by Staycity and a hotel containing 328 rooms operated by Motel One. As of February 2023, it is the largest purpose-built hotel in Manchester.

== Peterloo House ==
The site of 3 St Peter's Square was previously occupied by Peterloo House, an eight-storey 1970s office block that was demolished in 2018.

== 3 St Peter's Square ==
The developer, Property Alliance Group, had originally earmarked the site for new office space, but appraisals identified the potential for a hotel to be constructed instead.

Construction work for 3 St Peter's Square started in 2017, and was completed in 2022.

The building is finished in a decorative pre-cast concrete façade, similar in tone to the neighbouring One St Peter's Square and Two St Peter's Square office buildings and designed to be sympathetic to its location, close to the landmarks of Manchester Town Hall and Central Library.

Motel One occupies the first eight floors with 328 hotel rooms. Staycity Aparthotels occupies floors nine to 20, providing 256 studios and one-bedroom units under its 'Wilde Aparthotels' brand.
