= St. Peter's College, Agra =

St. Peter's College
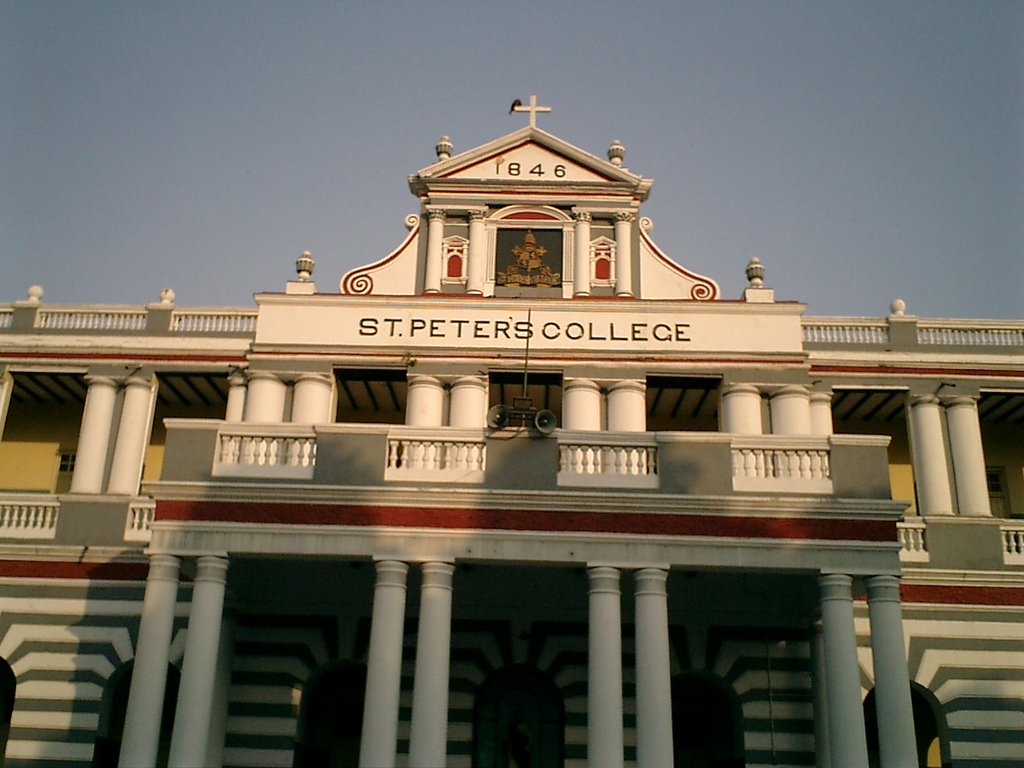
- St. Peter's College, Agra

Location
- Wazirpura Road, Agra, Uttar Pradesh; Agra, Uttar Pradesh 282002; India; 27°11′54″N 78°00′45″E

Information
- Type: Private school
- Motto: Palma non sine pulvere (No Reward Without Labour. )
- Founded: 1846; 180 years ago
- Founder: Rev.Dr.Joseph Antony Borghi
- School board: ISC (Class XII), ICSE (Class X)
- Principal: Rev. Fr. Dr.Alwyn Pinto(July 10, 2024-Present)
- Gender: All Boys School
- Language: English
- Hours in school day: Monday to Friday: Summer - 7:15a.m. to 1:45p.m. Winter-8:15a.m. to 2:45p.m. Saturday: Summer-7:15a.m. to 11:55 p.m. Winter-8:15a.m. to 12:55 p.m.
- Campus type: Urban
- Houses: St. Paul's (red); St. Francis' (blue); St. Lawrence (green); St. Peter's (yellow)
- Website: http://stpetersagra.org/

Founded in the year 1846, St. Peter's College, Agra is one of the oldest convent schools in India. The students are commonly referred to as Peterians. It is a Roman Catholic Institution granted Minority Rights under Article 30 of the Indian Constitution. It is located east of Paliwal Park and opposite the commercial district of Sanjay Place on Wazirpura road, Agra. The school is accredited under the Indian Certificate of Secondary Education board for grade 10th and under the Indian School Certificate board for Grade 12.

== History ==
- 1870 : Affiliated to Calcutta University. First Entrance Examination conducted. Title of College added.
- 1946 : Celebrated 100 years of its existence.
- 1963 : New block built (presently hosts the middle section).
- 1963 : Adopts Indian Certificate of Secondary Education system.
- 1966 : Head of institution changed from Rector to Principal.
- 1977 : Adopts the Indian School Certificate for Grade 12.
- 1984 : Boarding facility discontinued. St. Peter's College becomes full-time day-scholar system of education.
- 1996 : Celebrates sesquicentennial anniversary of 150 years of existence.
- 2003 : Construction changes, with 33 rooms, an administrative block and a multipurpose hall constructed.
- 2012 : Completed entrance construction.
- 2016 : Celebrated Athletic Meet.
- 2018 : Renovated Senior Wing
- 2019 : Administrative block in construction
- 2021 : New Administrative block is completed.
- 2021 : College celebrates 175 years of its founding.

== Alumni ==
- Daya Kishore Hazra, an Indian medical doctor
- Josh Malihabadi, Poet, Indian Freedom fighter
- Abrar Hasan khan (Asar Malihabadi) Poet, Sarbrahkar Nanpara, Health Minister Hyderabad

== photo ==
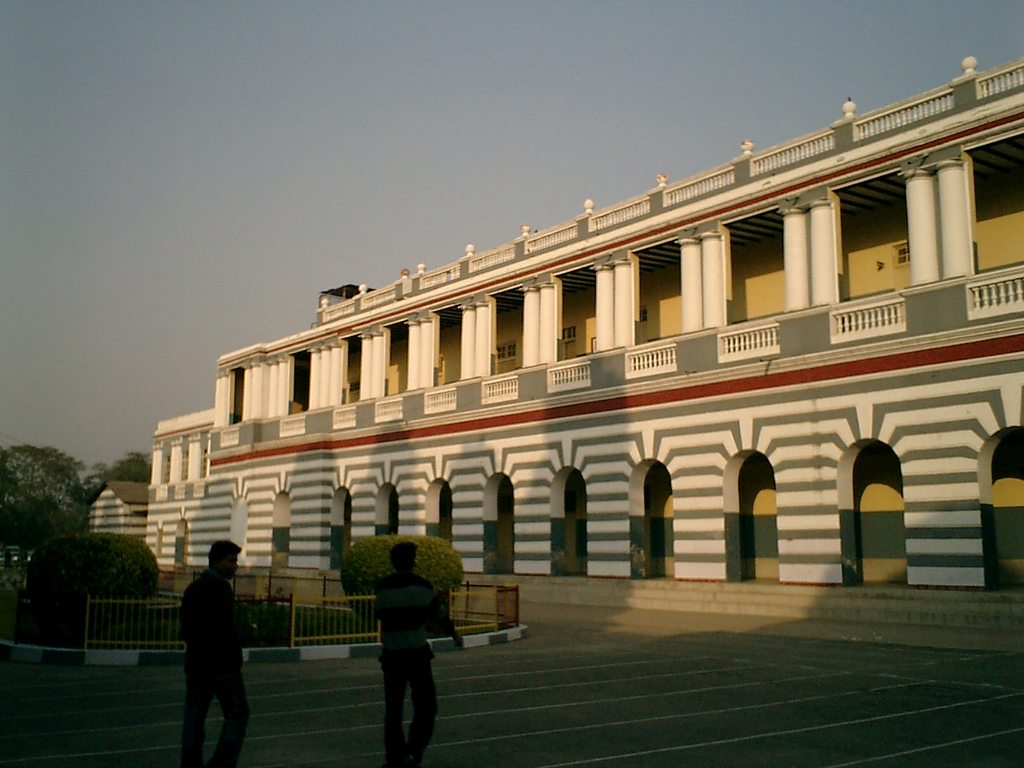
Main (Senior section) building

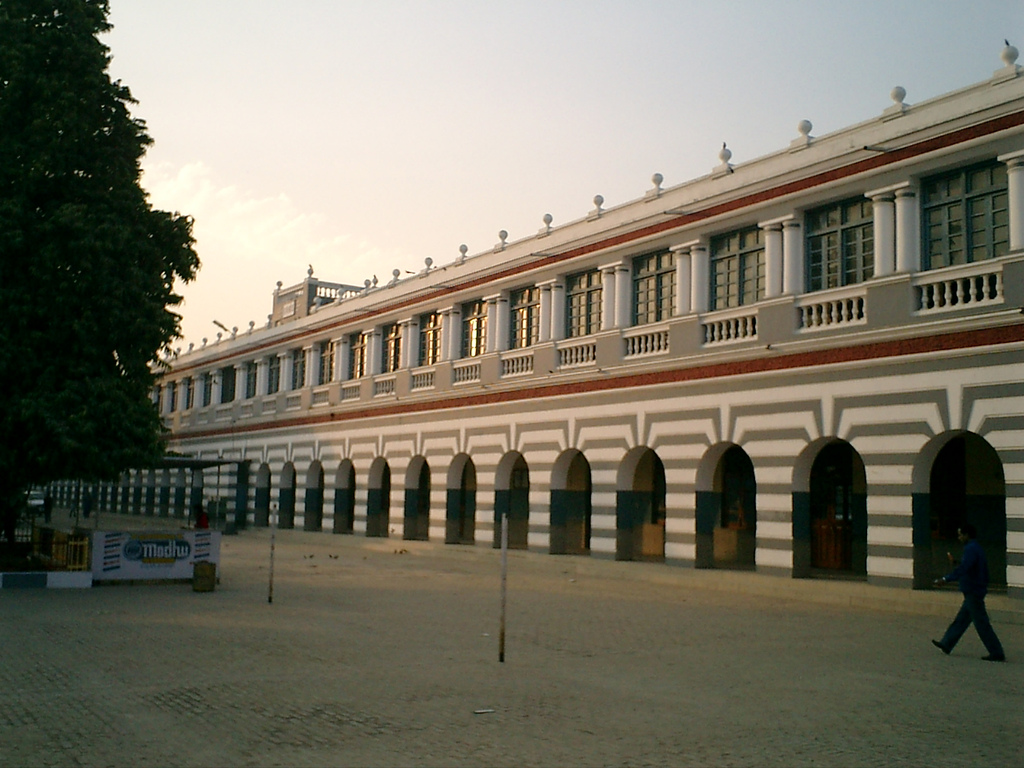
Middle section building

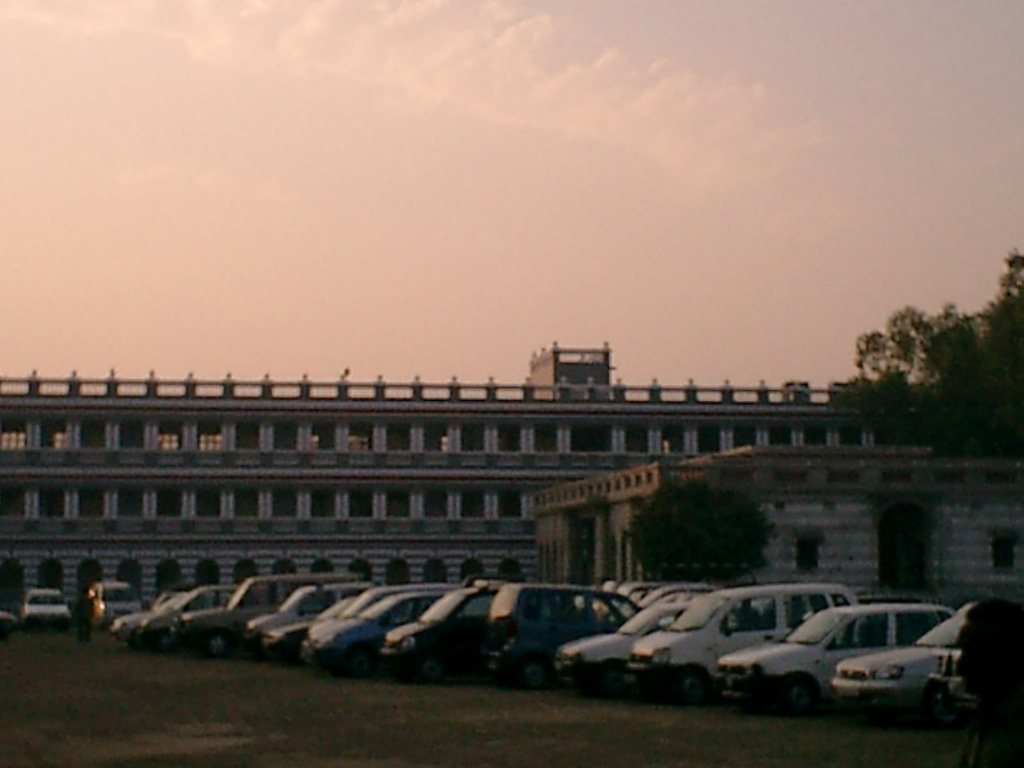
Primary section building
