= Saint Peter Island =

Saint Peter Island may refer to:

- St Peter Island (South Australia)
- Saint Peter Island (Bulgaria)
- Saint Peter and Saint Paul Archipelago, Brazil
- Saint Peter Islands, Russia

== See also ==
- St. Peter's Island, Switzerland
- Saint Pierre Island (disambiguation)
- San Pietro Island, Italy
