= Guildford Golf Club =

Golf club in Surrey, England

Coordinates: 51.2402°N 0.5358°W

Guildford Golf Club is a private members' golf club in Merrow, near Guildford, England. The club was founded in 1886 and the course was opened in June 1887. The club is the oldest in Surrey.

== History ==
Until 1870, the golf course was actually a race course. Laid out on land that was once part of the Onslow Estate, the club was founded by Colonel W. Bannatyne, Major W. Pontifex and Mr E.L. Hooper. The 4th Earl of Onslow gave his support to the project, and so became the President of the club. Originally, the course was just six holes in length, but by the early 1900s it had expanded to eighteen and the clubhouse was built.

== Clubhouse ==
The clubhouse was built in 1901 and was officially reopened by Peter Alliss in 1998, following a refurbishment. The clubhouse looks out over the Downs, with attractive views of the 18th hole. The club website states that the clubhouse has been "widely acclaimed as one of the best in the South East of England".

== The course ==
The course is an 18-hole parkland golf course set on the North Downs. It measures 6090 yards off the men's competition tees and has a par of 69. Being situated on chalk, it is seen as a good all-weather course. Often, there is a fairly strong wind across the Downs, significantly increasing the difficulty of the course.
