= St. Peter's Abbey =

St. Peter's Abbey, Abbey of St. Peter, etc. may refer to:

- Abbey of St. Peter, Assisi, Italy
- St. Peter's Abbey, Camaiore, former abbey in Camaiore, Italy
- St. Peter's Abbey, Chertsey, former abbey in Chertsey, England, United Kingdom
- St. Peter's Abbey, Ghent, Belgium
- St. Peter's Abbey, Gloucester, former abbey in Gloucester, England, United Kingdom
- St. Peter's Abbey, Hautvillers, former abbey in Hautvillers, Grand Est, France
- St. Peter's Abbey, Jumièges, former abbey in Jumièges, Normandy, France
- St. Peter's Abbey, Montmajour, former abbey in Arles, Provence, France
- St. Peter's Abbey, Muenster, Saskatchewan, Canada
- St. Peter's Abbey, Oudenburg, former abbey in Oudenburg, Belgium
- St. Peter's Abbey, Peterborough, former abbey in Peterborough, England, United Kingdom
- St. Peter's Archabbey, Salzburg, Austria, formerly and informally known as St. Peter's Abbey
- St. Peter's Abbey, Solesmes, Pays de la Loire, France
- St. Peter's Abbey, Westminster, former abbey in Westminster, England, United Kingdom
- St. Peter's Abbey in the Ardennes, former abbey in St. Hubert, Belgium
- St. Peter's Abbey in the Black Forest, former abbey in St. Peter im Schwarzwald, Baden-Württemberg, Germany
- St. Peter's Abbey on the Madron, former abbey in Flintsbach am Inn, Bavaria, Germany

== See also ==
- St. Peter's (disambiguation)
- St. Peter Stiftskulinarium, restaurant within St. Peter's Abbey, Salzburg
- Abbey of SS Peter and Paul
