= Lewis (lifting appliance) =

Device used to grip stones for lifting

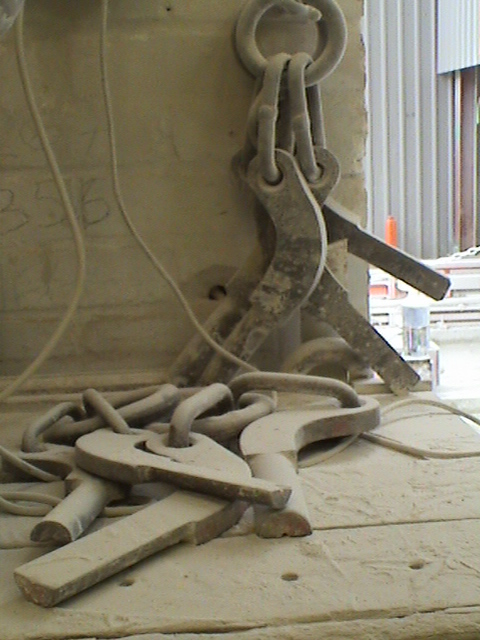
Lewises in a stonemasonry workshop

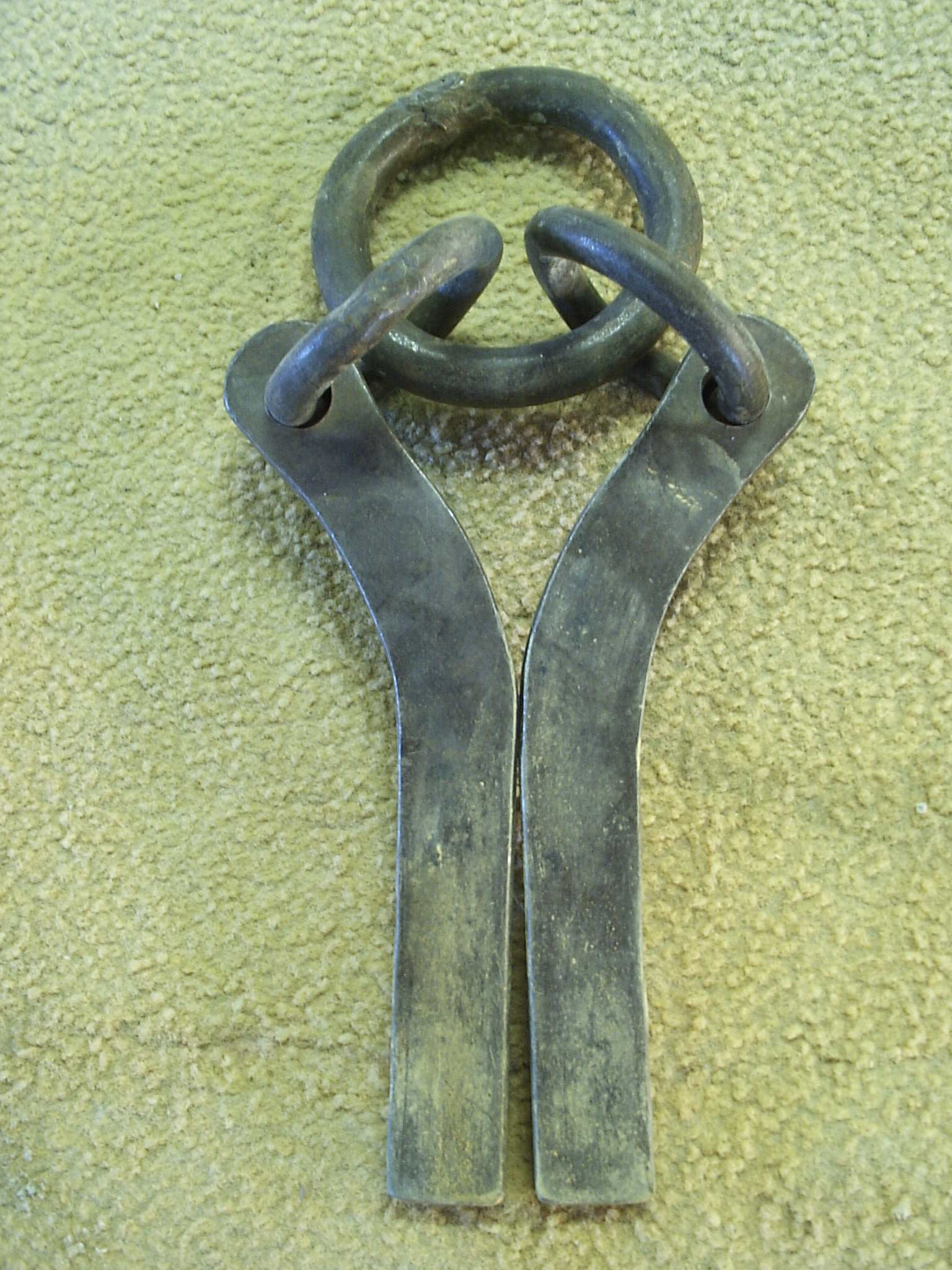
Chain lewis

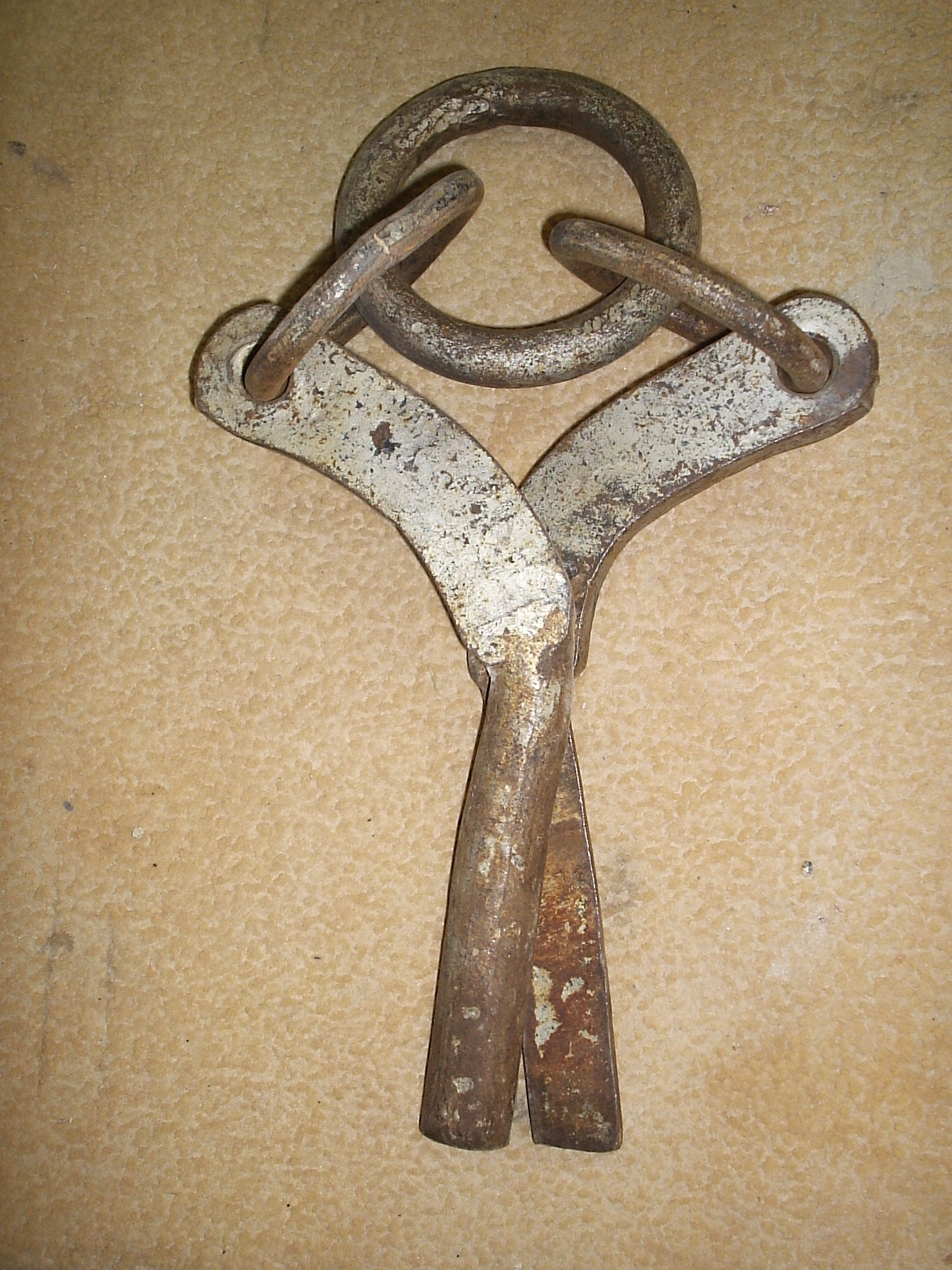
Split-pin lewis

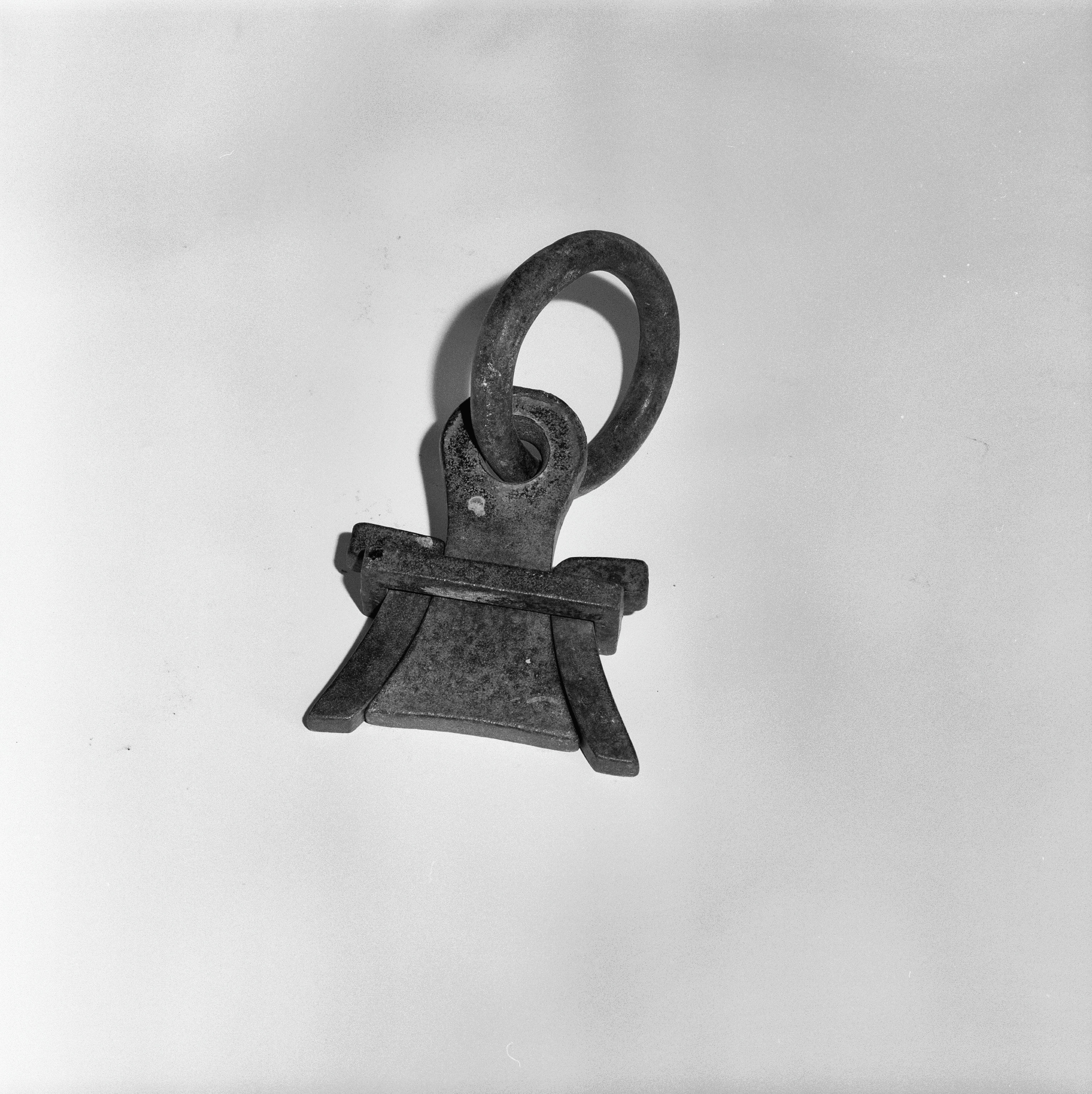
Three-legged lewis

A lewis (sometimes called a lewisson) is one of a category of lifting devices used by stonemasons to lift large stones into place with a crane, chain block, or winch. It is inserted into a specially prepared hole, or seating, in the top of a stone, preferably above its centre of mass. It works by applying principles of the lever and utilises the weight of the stone to act on the long lever-arms, which in turn results in a very high reaction force and friction where the short lever-arms make contact with the stone inside the hole and thereby prevents slipping.

== Etymology ==
The name lewis may come from the Latin levo -avi, -atum meaning to levitate or lift, but the Oxford English Dictionary Online states, "the formation and the phonology are not easily explained on this hypothesis", preferring "origin obscure", and speculating that the term may derive from a personal name. The Romans used the lewis. The specially shaped hole that is shaped to fit the device is known as a lewis hole. Lewis holes in the uppermost masonry coursings are neatly repaired with matching indented plugs after the stone has been set in place.

== Use ==
A lewis is most useful when it is not possible to lift the stone with chains or slings, because of either the location or shape of the stone, or delicate projections. Examples include the closing stone in a string course, cylindrical column drums, decorated column capitals, and coping stones in a pediment. Heavy ashlar stones are also bedded using a lewis.

The lewis is liable to slip out of the seating if some of the weight of the stone is subtracted from the appliance, such as when the stone bumps on the scaffolding on its way up to its final location. For this reason, a safety sling should always be used together with the lewis until the stone is reasonably close to its final position. Lifting the stone a small distance from the ground before hoisting is the best way to test a lewis. Any sign of looseness or damage should be corrected by adjusting the lewis hole or packing the lewis with metal shims.

To bed a stone using a lewis, the stone is placed on dunnage laid flat with enough clearance for a mortar bed to be placed beneath it. The safety straps are removed, the stone is lifted using the lewis alone, and the dunnage removed with fingers clear. The stone is then lowered onto the mortar bed, and positioned with sharp taps from a rubber mallet.

== Types of lewis ==
There are a number of different types of lewis used in the stonemasonry trade:

=== Two-pinned lewis ===
A two-pinned lewis consists of two pins, linked by a short chain. The pins are inserted into opposing holes that are drilled into the top of the stone at about 15° from vertical. It operates by gripping the stone (like two fingers lifting a tenpin bowling ball) as the weight of the stone is taken up by a crane or winch. The advantage of using this type of lewis is that it is simple to prepare: two angled drill holes are all that is necessary. Like other types of lewis, it is susceptible to pulling out as the stone is lifted. It should always be tested before hoisting, and used in conjunction with safety slings.

=== Chain-linked lewis ===
A chain-linked lewis or chain lewis is made from two curved steel legs, linked by three steel rings. The legs fit into a seating cut in the top of the stone, above the centre of mass. When the top of the curved legs are pulled together by the rings, the bottom portions are forced into the lower part of the seating, thereby providing enough friction to lift the stone.

=== Split-pin lewis ===
The split-pin lewis is similar to the chain-linked lewis in that it uses a scissor-like action to produce friction against the inside of the lewis hole. The two legs, semicircular in section, lie side-by-side, and fit inside a hole drilled in the stone. This type of lewis seating is the simplest to prepare, requiring a single drilled hole.

=== Three-legged lewis ===
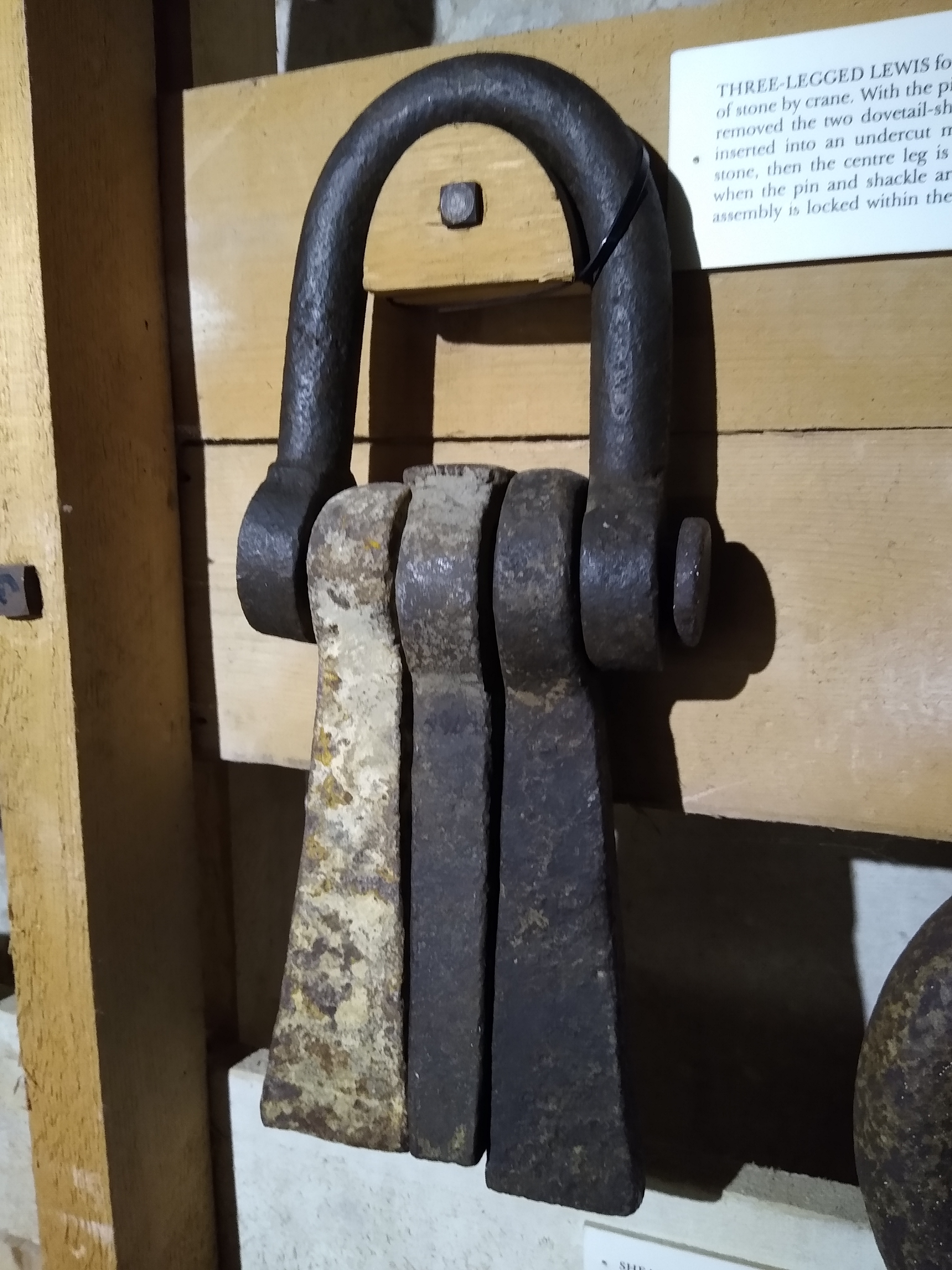
Three-legged lewis

A three-legged lewis, also known as a dovetailed lewis, St Peter's keys, or a Wilson bolt, fits into a dovetailed seating in the top of a building stone. It is made from three pieces of rectangular-section 13 mm (0.51 in)-thick steel legs held together with a shackle, allowing connection to a lifting hook. The middle leg is square throughout its length, while the outer legs are thinner at the top, flaring towards the bottom. Held together, the three legs thus form a dovetail shape. The lewis hole seating is undercut (similar to a chain-linked lewis hole) to match its profile.

The first outer leg is inserted into the lewis hole, followed by the second outer leg. The inner (parallel) leg is inserted last, pushing the outer legs into contact with the inside of the lewis hole. The shackle is unbolted, placed over the legs, and the bolt fastened through both the shackle eyes and the eye in the top of each leg. (See gallery below for diagram.)

This type of lewis is the safest to use because it relies on its dovetailed shape for security instead of friction alone, but the seating is time-consuming to prepare.

Their resemblance, once assembled, to a bunch of keys gave rise to an alternative name for them of "St Peter's keys". This has frequently been represented allegorically, drawing the name of "St. Peter" as "the Rock on which I shall found my Church" into an allegory between the fabric of a church building and the community of the church itself. Some illustrations of St Peter even show him carrying a bunch of keys, which appear to have no wards. These are not keys in the lock-making sense, but in this sense of stonemasonry.

=== External lewis ===
The external lewis, kerb lifter or slab lifter is a type of lifting device used in the stonemasonry trade since Medieval times. The external lewis was originally shaped like a pair of scissor-tongs, and swung from a treadwheel crane. This type of tong device has been known as dogs and the holes in the stone as dog holes for many centuries. Many old bridges and walls in the UK still have dog holes to reveal how the stones were lifted, particularly onto bridge parapets.

The external lewis has been modified to handle kerbstones and large slabs of polished stone in contemporary stone yards.

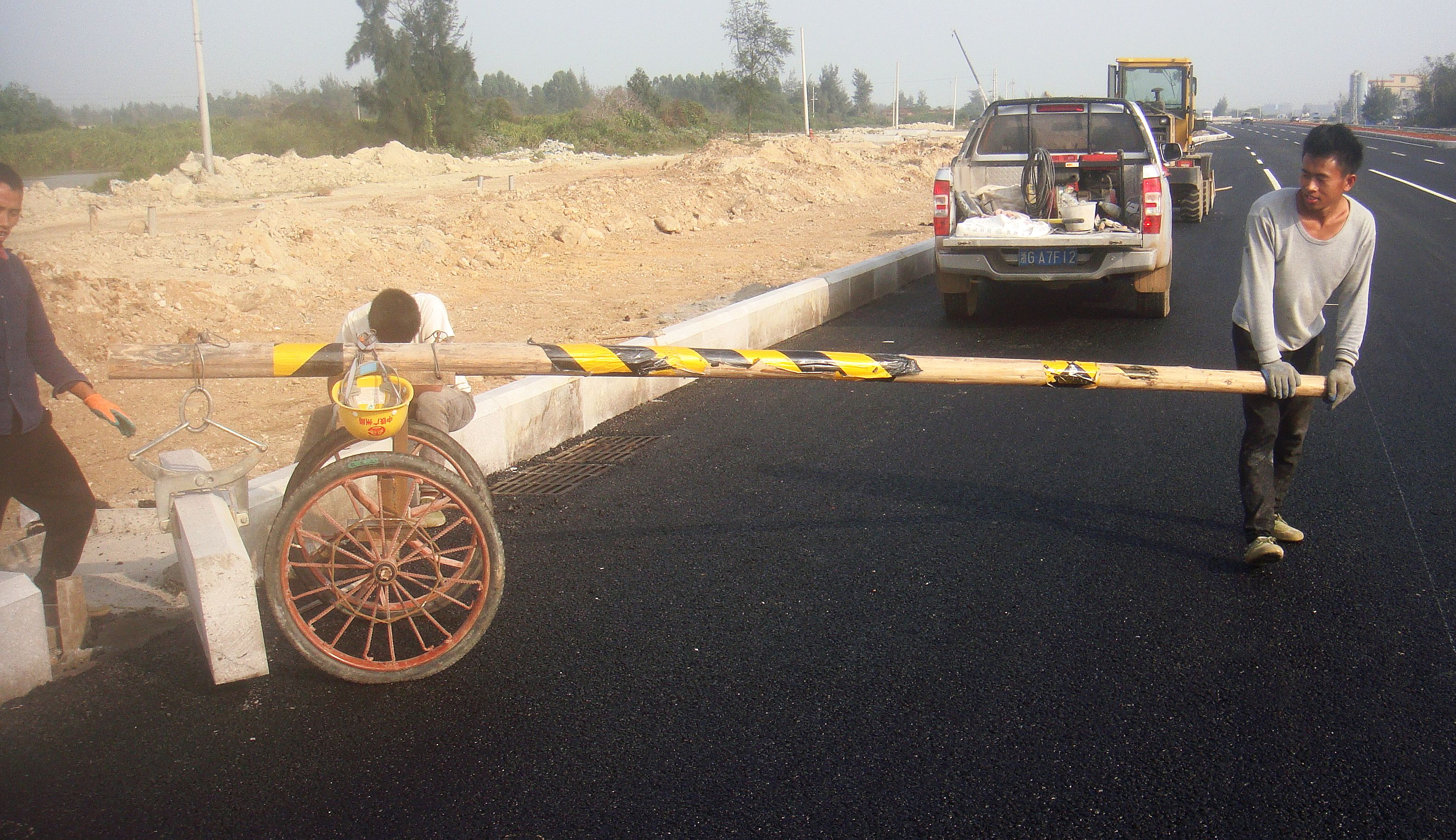
A kerb lifter lifting kerb stones in Hainan, China

A manual kerb lifter is a large, adjustable pair of tongs, made with a pair of handles so that two people can manoeuvre heavy blocks of stone into position. A mechanical kerb lifter can also be made to fit mechanical lifters like forklifts or crane-trucks so that larger stones can be placed.

In stone yards, a slab lifter is hung from a shed gantry or forklift to transport slabs of stone between storage racks and stone processing machines. It consists of two hinged, weighted friction pads that close astride the top of a slab, and are pulled tightly together by the weight of the slab itself.

The slab lifter uses two safety devices. Safety chains and a support bracket allow safe lifting of large slabs. This lifting appliance also has a safety locking device that is engaged when the gripping pads are activated by the weight of the stone. This prevents any jerking movement from releasing the stone. It is easily disengaged once the slab is secured at its destination.

== Gallery ==
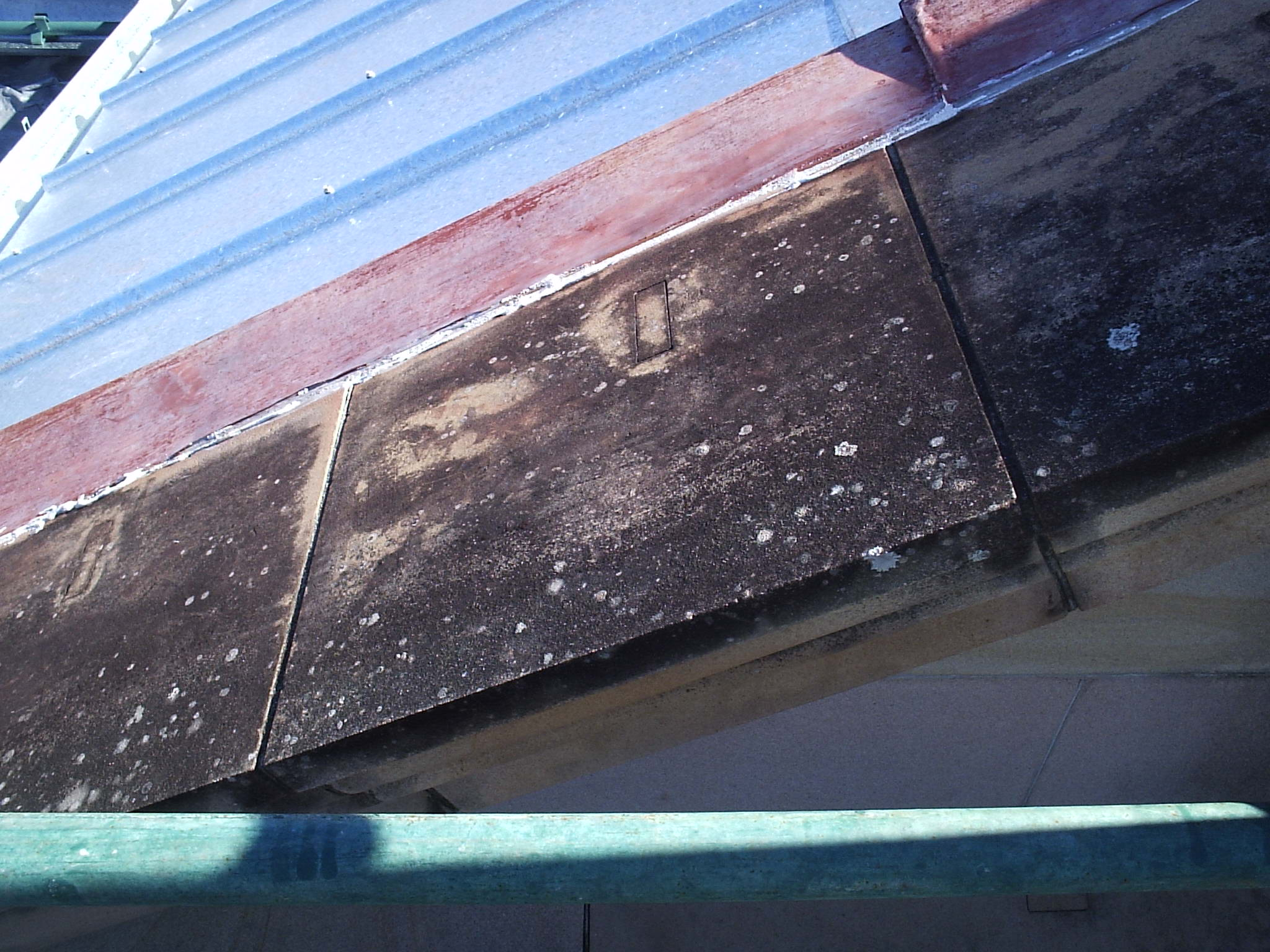
Indented lewis holes

A split-pin lewis placed in the top of an altar stone

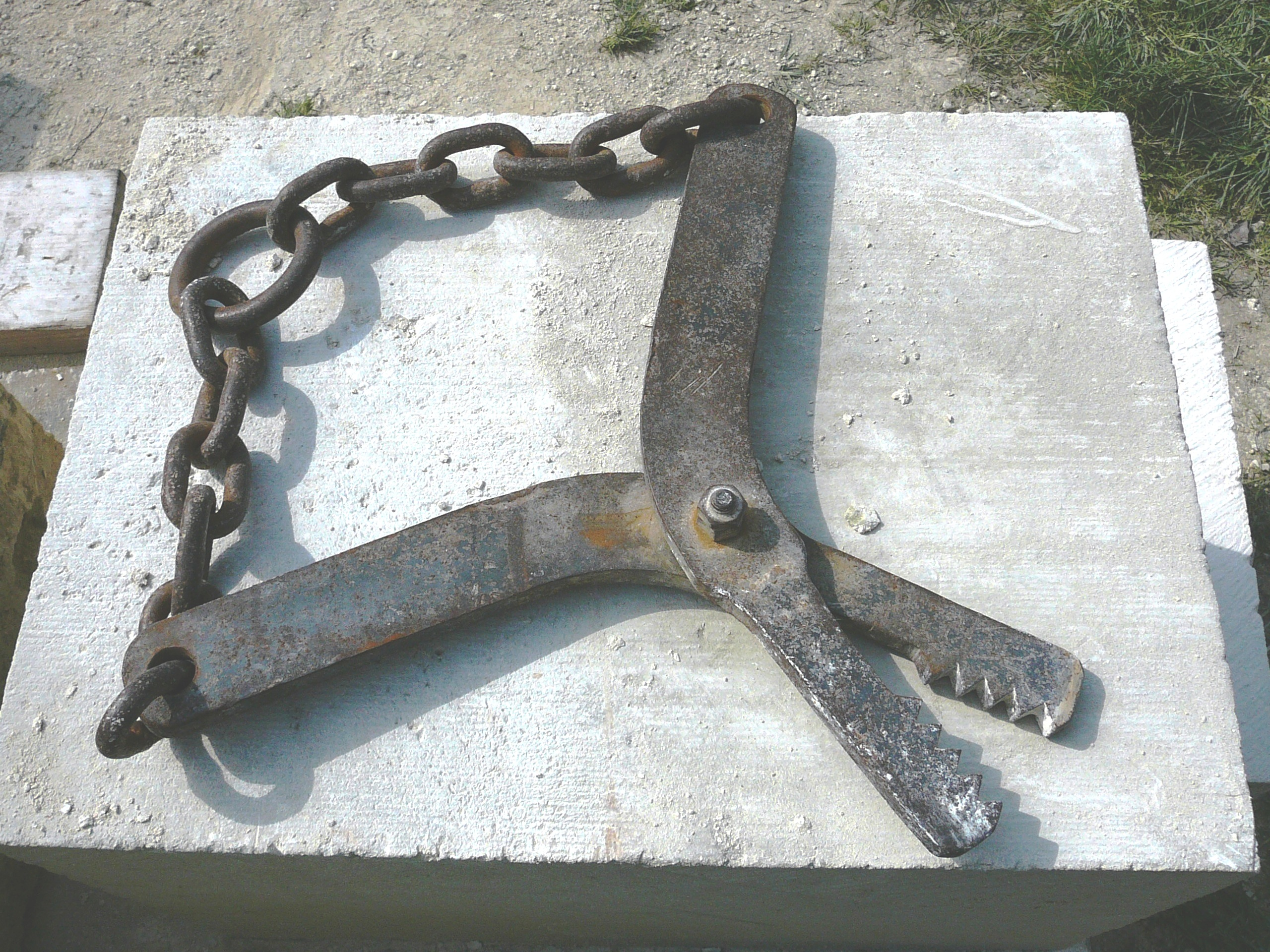
A French-type chain-linked lewis

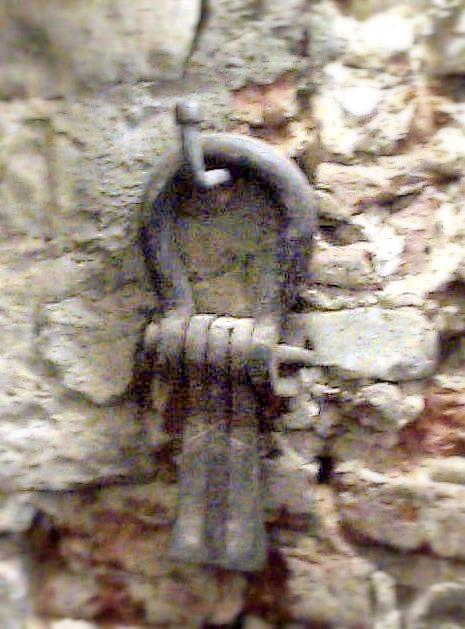
St Peter's keys in the Duomo, Florence

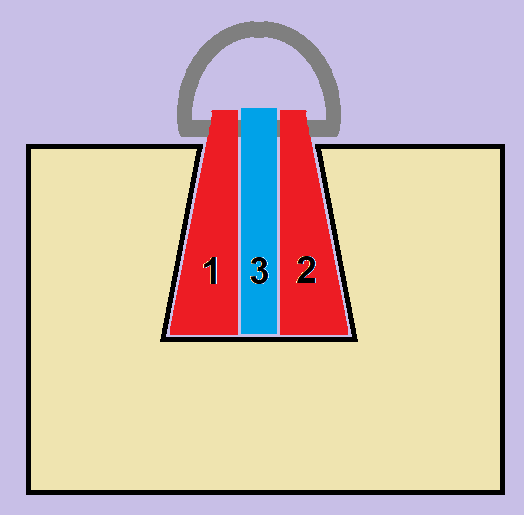
The principle of the three-legged lewis. The sections are inserted 1, 2, then 3.

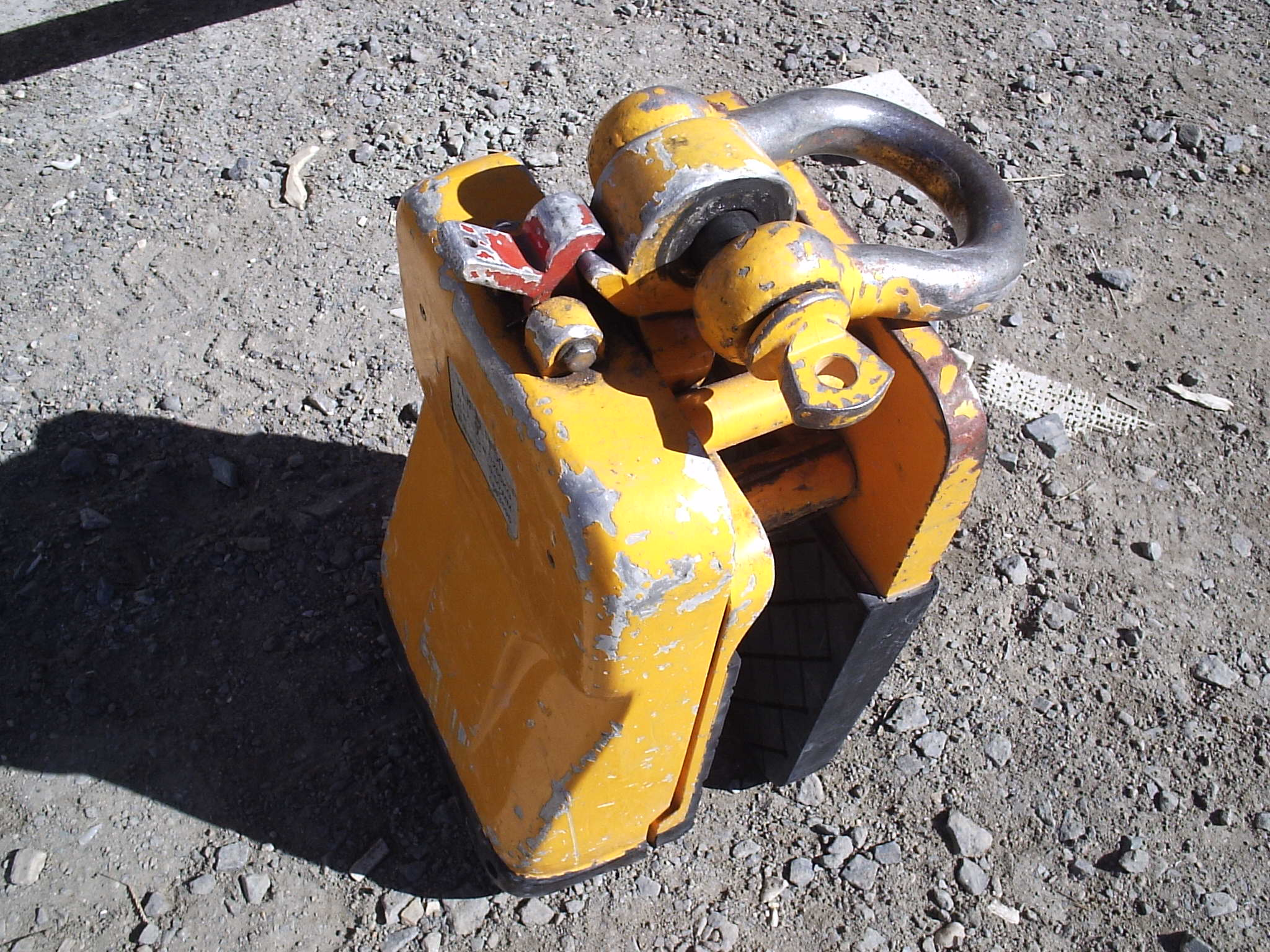
External lewis: gravity-clamp slab lifter

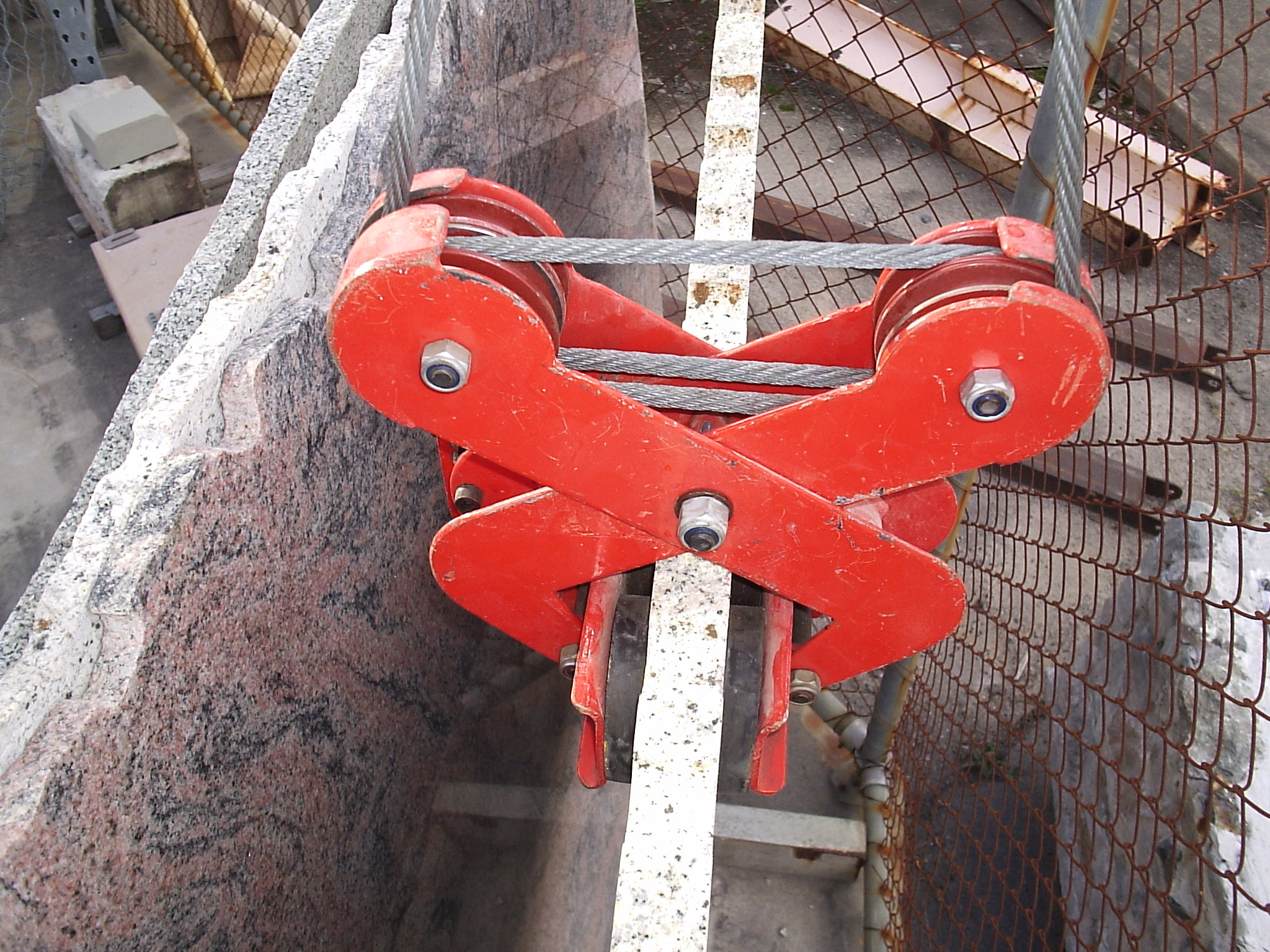
Slab lifter

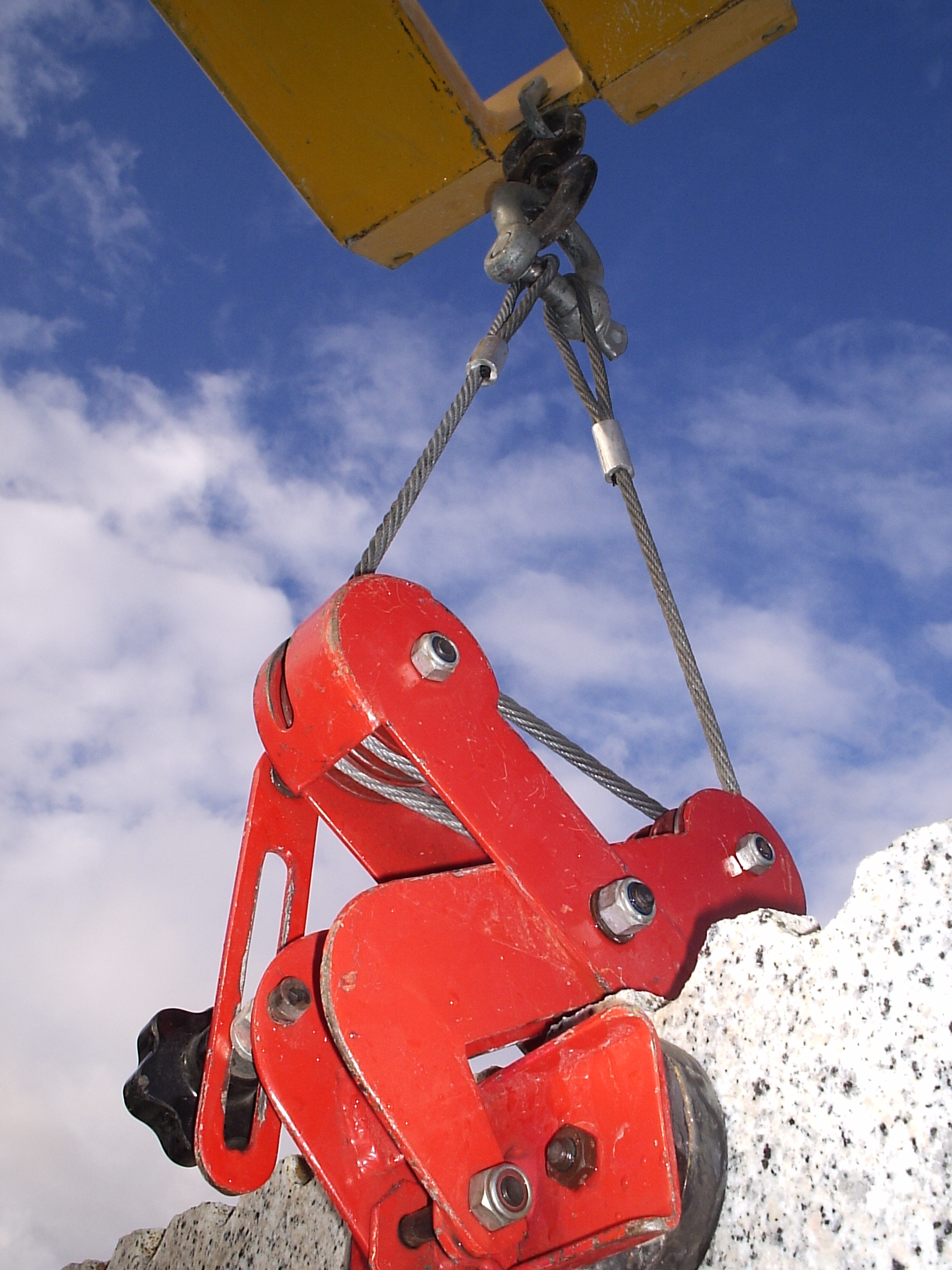
Slab lifter safety lock

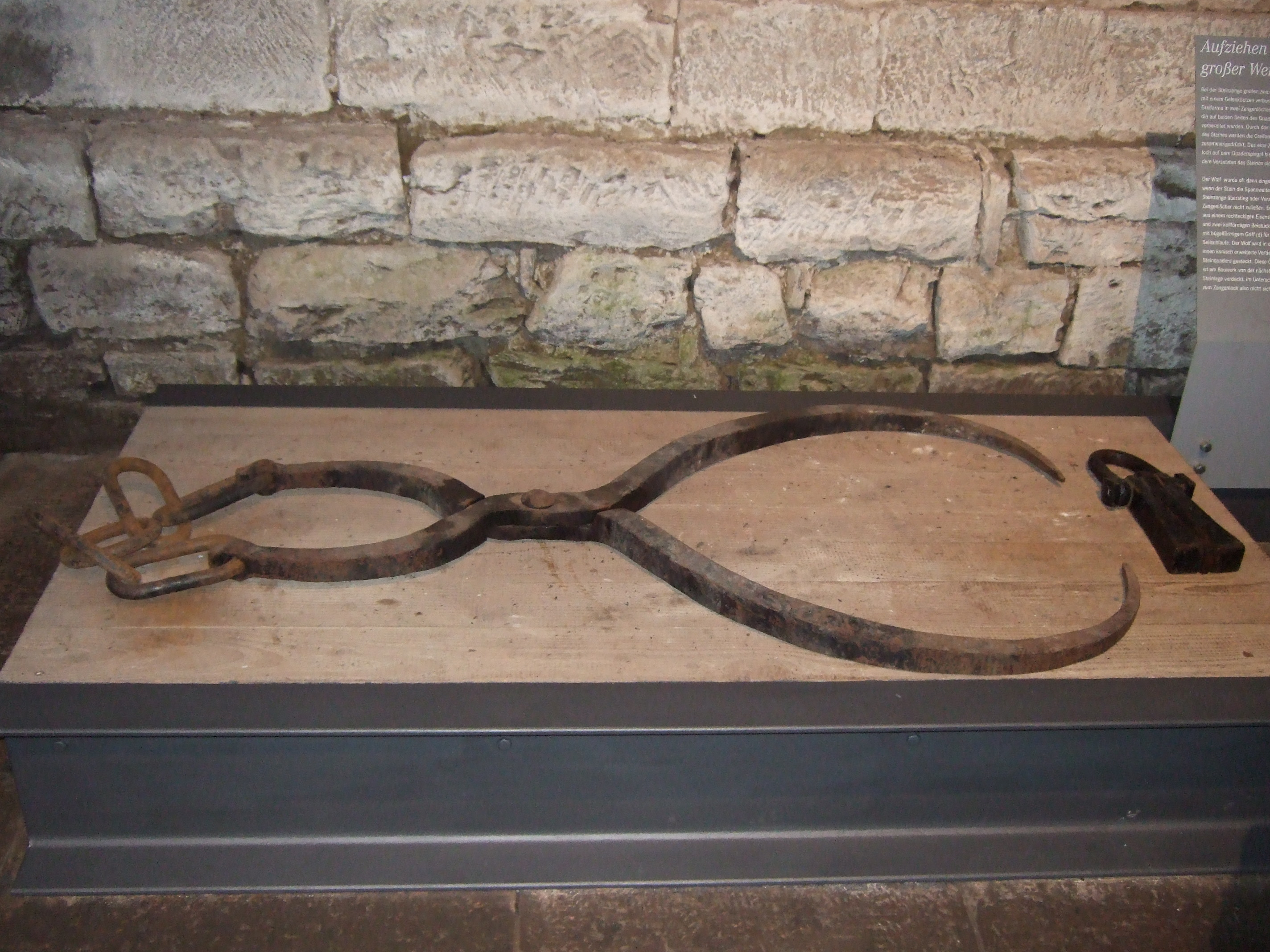
A German kerb lifter and St Peter's keys

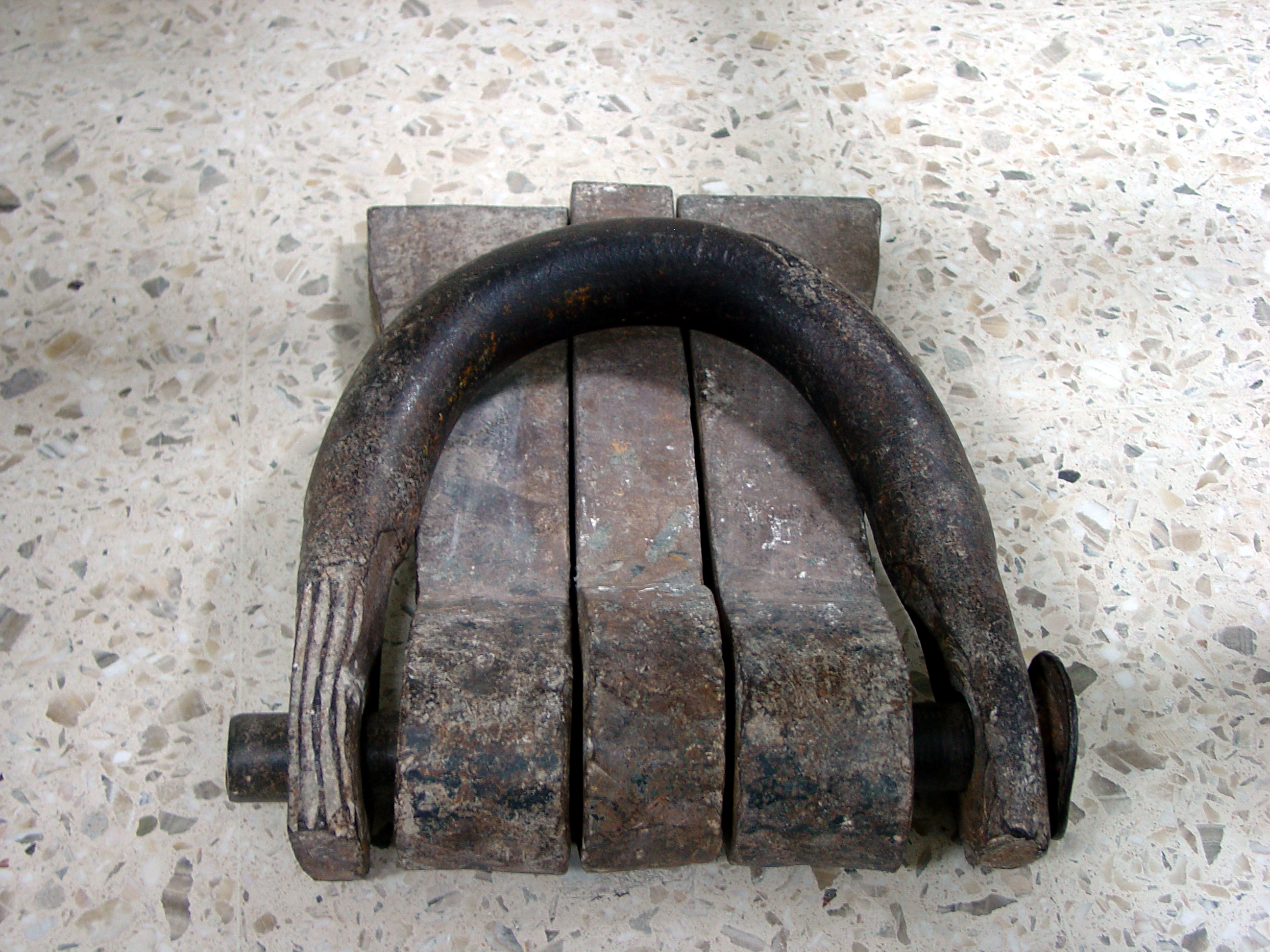
Roman three-legged lewis, found in Amman, Jordan
