= St Peter's Roman Catholic Primary School, Aberdeen =

Coordinates: 57°10′4.2″N 2°5′49.7″W

St. Peter's RC Primary School

Location
- Dill Road; Aberdeen, AB24 2XL; Scotland

Information
- Type: Primary
- Religious affiliation: Roman Catholic
- Established: 1833; 193 years ago
- Local authority: Aberdeen City Council
- Head Teacher: Liam Sturrock
- Gender: Co-educational
- Age: 4 to 12
- Enrolment: 195
- SEED number: 5242126
- Website: www.st-peters.aberdeen.sch.uk

St Peter's RC Primary School is a Catholic primary school in Aberdeen, Scotland that was established in 1833. Its Head Teacher is Mr Liam Sturrock and the school educates around 190 pupils in eight classes.

== History ==
St Peter's RC Primary School was founded on 10 April 1833, on Aberdeen's Constitution Street, by Father Charles Gordon, who was the parish priest of the local St Peter's Church. A statue in his honour is in the school's front garden. The statue was created in 1859 by the sculptor Alexander Brodie (1829-1867). The school was linked to St Mary's Cathedral when it was opened in 1860.

A few years after the First World War the school moved to a new building on Nelson Street, which was a suitable location due to the high number of Catholics living in the area at the time. The school moved to its present premises at Dunbar Street in 1983.

The council decided, during the 70's, that St Peter's pupils could obtain religious education at Linksfield Academy, when they decided to close the secondary school, and leave it primary school only.

The school has been part of the Eco-Schools project since September 2004.

In 2006, a controversial proposal to move the school to the site of St Machar Primary school was rejected after a campaign that included public meetings and a Freedom of Information request to establish the reason for the move.

== Academic standards ==
The school was last inspected, by Education Scotland, in December 2022. The school was rated 'good' on two of the key indicators.

== Community contributions ==
Pupils from St Peter's and two other local schools produced books and artwork celebrating the history of Old Aberdeen. An exhibition of the work, undertaken in conjunction with regional writers and artists, was displayed in May 2009 at the University of Aberdeen. The pupils created their own mini-museum, in April 2010, being the first school to make use of a special cabinet commissioned by Aberdeen University.

== Extracurricular activities ==
In July 2002, a pupil delegation from the school, led by Archbishop Mario Conti, formerly Bishop of Aberdeen, represented Scotland at the World Youth Day festival in Toronto. During the event, which included a visit by Pope John Paul II, the pupils wore a distinctive Celtic cross design devised by Alastair Thompson, an inmate of Porterfield Prison, Inverness. Thompson was jailed for life for murdering his grandmother in 1968; while out on licence for that murder, he killed a 52-year-old man and dismembered the body in a bathtub. He became a Christian while in prison and was asked by Aberdeen Diocese to design a logo for the trip.

As part of the Careers Scotland Space School, in June 2006, the school was visited by cosmonaut Aleksandr Lazutkin and NASA scientist Pete Hasbrook. A spokesman for Careers Scotland said: "The NASA visits are an extraordinary experience for the pupils, their schools and their community. Rarely do young people have the chance to meet individuals who have achieved their dreams. The NASA scientists are truly motivational and on a practical level they help the pupils to understand the important role of science, technology, and enterprise in the world today."

In August 2006, the school was awarded the Royal Horticultural Society of Aberdeen's "Harry Duncan Trophy" for the best exhibit of junior floral art at the society's annual flower show.

The school came first in Scotland in the 'Active Kids Get Cooking' competition, representing their country in the UK finals, held in London, in June 2008.

On 14 May 2012, a team of four pupils from the school took part in the annual national Euroquiz finals, held in the Scottish Parliament's Debating Chamber at Holyrood, Edinburgh. The quiz tests pupils on subjects including European languages, history, culture, and sport.

== Multicultural ==
The school is multicultural with 29 pupils' native tongues being Arabic, Basque, Bengali, Cantonese, Chichewa, Chinese (Mandarin), Dari, Dutch, English, Finnish, Persian, French, Hungarian (Magyar), Konkani language, Malay (Bahasa Malaysia), Malayalam, Nepali, Newari, Polish, Punjabi, Russian, Setswana, Shona, Swahili, Tamil, Telugu, Twi, Urdu and Yoruba. As of March 2009, 97 pupils out of 198 were taught English as a foreign language.
