= St. Peter's Cathedral =

St. Peter's Cathedral, or variations of the name, may refer to:

== Australia ==
- St Peter's Cathedral, Adelaide, an Anglican cathedral in the South Australian capital of Adelaide
- St Peter's Cathedral, Armidale, an Anglican cathedral in New South Wales

== Bangladesh ==
- St Peter's Cathedral, Barisal, a cathedral in Barisal, Bangladesh

== Canada ==
- St. Peter's Cathedral Basilica, London, Ontario
- Cathedral of Saint Peter-in-Chains, Peterborough, Ontario
- St. Peter's Cathedral (Charlottetown), Prince Edward Island

== Colombia ==
- St. Peter the Apostle Cathedral, Buga
- St. Peter the Apostle Cathedral, Cali

== Republic of Congo ==
- St. Peter the Apostle Cathedral, Pointe-Noire

== Croatia ==
- Đakovo Cathedral, Cathedral basilica of St. Peter in Đakovo

== France ==
- St. Peter's Cathedral, Vannes, Brittany

== Germany ==
- St. Peter's Cathedral (Osnabrück), Lower Saxony
- Bremen Cathedral, dedicated to St. Peter
- Cologne Cathedral, North Rhine-Westphalia, dedicated to St. Peter
- Regensburg Cathedral, Bavaria, dedicated to St. Peter
- Cathedral of St. Peter at Schleswig, Schleswig-Holstein
- Cathedral of Saint Peter, Trier, Rhineland-Palatinate
- Cathedral of St Peter, Worms, Rhineland-Palatinate

== Honduras ==
- St. Peter the Apostle Cathedral, San Pedro Sula

== Indonesia ==
- St. Peter's Cathedral, Bandung

== Ireland ==
- St. Peter the Rock Cathedral, Cashel

== Italy ==
- Cathedral Basilica of St. Peter Apostle, Frascati

== Malawi ==
- St Peter's Cathedral, Likoma

== Morocco ==
- St. Peter's Cathedral, Rabat, a Roman Catholic cathedral located in downtown Rabat, Morocco, at place du Golan (Golan Square). It is built in Art Deco and is the seat of the Archdiocese of Rabat

== New Zealand ==
- St. Peter's Cathedral, Hamilton, the Anglican cathedral in Hamilton, located in the Waikato Region of North Island, New Zealand. It is located on a small hill, known as Cathedral Hill (Pukerangiora in Maori), in the southern central part of the city off Victoria Street

== Spain ==
- Cathedral of Jaca, dedicated to St. Peter

== Switzerland ==
- St. Peter's Protestant Cathedral of Geneva, Geneva

== United Kingdom ==
- Exeter Cathedral, Exeter, England, formally known as "Cathedral Church of Saint Peter, Exeter"
- Bradford Cathedral, Bradford, England, formally known as "Cathedral Church of St Peter, Bradford"
- Cathedral Church of St Peter, St Paul and St Andrew, Peterborough, Peterborough, England, also known as Saint Peter's Cathedral
- Lancaster Cathedral, Lancaster, England, formally known as "Saint Peter's Cathedral, Lancaster"
- St Peter's Cathedral, Belfast, Northern Ireland
- York Minster, York, England, dedicated to St. Peter and formally known as "Cathedral and Metropolitical Church of Saint Peter in York"

== United States (by state) ==
See: Category:Roman Catholic cathedrals in the United States

- Our Lady of Mt. Lebanon-St. Peter Cathedral (Los Angeles), California (Maronite Catholic)
- St. Peter Chaldean Catholic Cathedral (El Cajon, California), seat for the Eparchy of St. Peter the Apostle
- Cathedral of Saint Peter (Wilmington, Delaware), Roman Catholic Diocese of Wilmington
- Cathedral Church of St. Peter (St. Petersburg, Florida), Episcopal Diocese of Southwest Florida
- Cathedral Church of St. Peter (Tallahassee, Florida), ACNA Gulf Atlantic Diocese
- St. Peter's Cathedral (Belleville, Illinois), Roman Catholic Diocese of Belleville
- Cathedral of Saint Peter (Rockford, Illinois), Roman Catholic Diocese of Rockford
- Cathedral of Saint Peter (Kansas City, Kansas), Roman Catholic Archdiocese of Kansas City
- St. Peter Cathedral (Marquette, Michigan), listed on the National Register of Historic Places (NRHP) in Marquette County
- Cathedral of St. Peter the Apostle (Jackson, Mississippi), the seat of the Bishop of the Roman Catholic Diocese of Jackson, Mississippi
- St. Peter's Cathedral (Helena, Montana), Episcopal Diocese of Montana
- Cathedral Basilica of Saint Peter in Chains (Cincinnati), Ohio, listed on the NRHP in Hamilton County
- St. Peter Cathedral (Erie, Pennsylvania)
- Cathedral Basilica of Saints Peter and Paul (Philadelphia), Pennsylvania, listed on the NRHP in Philadelphia County
- St. Peter's Cathedral (Scranton, Pennsylvania) (Roman Catholic), listed on the NRHP in Lackawanna County

== Vatican City ==
- St. Peter's Basilica, a church often mistaken for a cathedral
  - Old St. Peter's Basilica, the building that once stood on the spot where the Basilica of Saint Peter stands today in Rome

== Venezuela ==
- St. Peter the Apostle Cathedral, La Guaira

== See also ==
- St. Peter's Church (disambiguation)
- St. Peter's (disambiguation)
- Cathédrale Saint-Pierre (disambiguation)
