= St. Peter's Catholic Secondary School =

Location
- 201 Ashford Drive; Barrie, Ontario, L4M 6A3; Canada; 44°21′N 79°40′W

Information
- School type: Catholic High school
- Founded: 1996
- School board: Simcoe Muskoka Catholic District School Board
- Principal: Brad Shoreman
- Grades: 9-12
- Enrollment: 1400
- Language: English
- Colours: Purple and grey
- Mascot: Petey Panther
- Team name: St. Peter's Panthers
- Website: pet.smcdsb.on.ca

S. Peter's Catholic Secondary School is located in Barrie, Ontario, Canada. It is a member of the Simcoe Muskoka Catholic District School Board. The school is informally referred to as St. Pete's or St. Peter's. St. Peters was founded in 1996 and had an addition built on the west side of the school in 2010-2011 which consisted of six new classrooms, a new dance studio and fitness room, and a new student success center to accommodate the growing number of students. St. Peters also has a daycare/preschool attached to it. Six feeder schools contribute to the high school's population each year, these include but are not limited to: Holy Cross Catholic School, St. Francis of Assisi Catholic School, Saint Gabriel the Archangel Catholic School, St. John Paul II Catholic School, St John Vianney Catholic School, and St. Michael the Archangel Catholic School. The school's population is approximately 1400 students. The principal is Brad Shoreman and vice principals are Janet Cinnamon and Rose Lafrance.

Although the school colours are gray and purple the uniforms are white, black, dark green, and gray. The uniforms include articles such as: polo shirts, vests, sweaters, cardigans, dress pants, walking shorts, capris, and gym apparel as well. Students are only allowed to wear plain black or white t-shirts or long sleeved shirts under their uniforms. Black jeans, yoga pants and or any other bottoms that are not school issued dress pants are not permitted. To avoid this problem St. Peters dress pants are fashioned with a cross and the letters SP sewn into the side of the right pant leg to help staff identify which students are wearing the proper pants.

Annual events include Monsignor Clair Cup, Halloween dress up day, Spirit week, Clash of Colours, PJ Day, Christmas assembly, Talent show, sears festival, locker clean-out, Ash Wednesday, Catholic Education Week, Ecuador Mission Trip, Film Festival, and Pride week. These events help to solidify a strong school community and help build teamwork skills as most of these events you participate as groups, teams, or grades.

== Athletics ==
Fall sports:

- Junior and senior girls' basketball
- Junior football
- Junior boys' hockey
- Junior and senior boys' soccer

== Clubs ==
- Anime Club
- Panther Video Game Review Club
- Chess Club
- Prom Committee
- Panther Athletic Council
- Panther Student Union
- Panther Fitness Club
- Panthers for Justice
- Avid Readers Club
- Breakfast Program
- Robotics Club
- Auto Club
- Tech Crew
- Link Crew
- Yearbook Committee
- Photography Club
- PSU Exec
- Action Team/ (Spirit)
- Dance Committee
- Sales and Operations
- Debate Team

== See also ==
- Education in Ontario
- List of secondary schools in Ontario
