= Collegeland, County Armagh =

Area in County Armagh, Northern Ireland

Coordinates: 54.425°N 6.656°W

Collegeland: Irish: An Choláiste
- Location within Northern Ireland
- Population: 122
  - Belfast: 32 mi (51 km)
  - Dublin: 77 mi (124 km)
- District: Armagh City, Banbridge and Craigavon
- County: County Armagh
- Country: Northern Ireland
- Sovereign state: United Kingdom
- Post town: DUNGANNON
- Postcode district: BT71
- Dialling code: 028
- Police: Northern Ireland
- Fire: Northern Ireland
- Ambulance: Northern Ireland
- UK Parliament: Newry and Armagh
- NI Assembly: Newry and Armagh

Collegeland is a semi-rural area in north County Armagh, Northern Ireland. It includes the townlands of Aghinlig, Keenaghan, Lislasley, Kinnego, Mullaghmore, and Tirmacrannon near the village of Charlemont and just across the River Blackwater from Moy, County Tyrone, within the Armagh City, Banbridge and Craigavon Borough Council area. It had a population of 122 people (42 households) in the 2011 census.

In 1859, the lease of the Collure estate (as it was then known) was inherited at his father's death by John Howard Parnell, elder brother of Charles Stewart Parnell. In 1879, John Parnell, financially strapped, offered his subtenants terms on which to purchase their own farms, according to the "John Bright Clauses" of the Landlord and Tenant (Ireland) Act 1870. As late as 1980, tenant farmers in the area paid rent to the estate of Olivia Parnell (widow of John Howard Parnell). A portion of the rents paid for upkeep of Trinity College, Dublin, hence the name "Collegeland."

Five killings in the Collegeland townlands of Aghinlig and Lislasley are noted in the article on The Troubles in Loughgall.

== Sport ==
The village is home to Collegeland O'Rahilly's Gaelic Athletic Club. They won the Armagh junior championship in 2007 by beating Clady in Armagh (final scores Collegeland 1:09 Clady 0:09).

== People ==
- Paul Muldoon - poet and academic; professor of Creative Writing at Princeton University

== See also ==
- List of towns and villages in Northern Ireland
