= St Peter's Catholic School, Guildford =

Coordinates: 51.247°N 0.537°W

St Peter's Catholic School

Location
- Horseshoe Lane East; Guildford, Surrey, GU1 2TN; England

Information
- Type: Academy
- Religious affiliation: Roman Catholic
- Established: Jan. 1948 and c.1945 1971 (merger)
- Founder: Archbishop Peter Amigo (1947 constituent); Daughters of Mary and Joseph (1945 constituent)
- Local authority: Surrey County Council
- Trust: Xavier Catholic Education Trust
- Department for Education URN: 147430 Tables
- Ofsted: Reports
- Headteacher: Elizabeth Bolton
- Gender: Co-educational
- Age: 11 to 18
- Enrolment: 1272
- Publication: St Peter's School Newsletters
- Diocese: Arundel and Brighton
- Former pupils: Old Petrovians
- Website: www.st‑petersschool.co.uk

St Peter's Catholic School, colloquially known as St Peter's, is a co-educational secondary school and sixth form located in Guildford, Surrey, England. It is a Roman Catholic school affiliated to the Diocese of Arundel and Brighton.

== History ==
The present school was formed by the merger of the original St. Peter's Boys school and Merrow Grange, a Catholic girls school. St Peter's School was founded by Archbishop Amigo in 1947, and named after his patron saint, St. Peter . It was housed in two buildings. One was the present site on Horseshoe Lane East, and the other in Horseshoe Lane West. The Headmaster and a number of the teachers were Diocesan Priests.

Merrow Grange was on the corner of Horseshoe Lane East and the Epsom Road. In October 1945 it was purchased by the Ladies of Mary (who later became the Daughters of Mary and Joseph) and became an independent girls school called Merrow Grange. It was a Convent School run by the Daughters of Mary and Joseph, a foundation which continues to fund educational project in many other geographic areas.

In 1971 by agreement the Diocese took over the running of the Girls' School to form a coeducational school. The larger mixed institution's newly constituted governors' board, with teacher consultation, named itself St Peter's and Merrow Grange School and later for some years St Peter's Catholic Comprehensive School. In May 2010 the school adopted the name St. Peter's Catholic School.

Previously a voluntary aided school administered by Surrey County Council, in September 2019 St Peter's Catholic School converted to academy status and is now sponsored by the Xavier Catholic Education Trust.

== Facilities ==
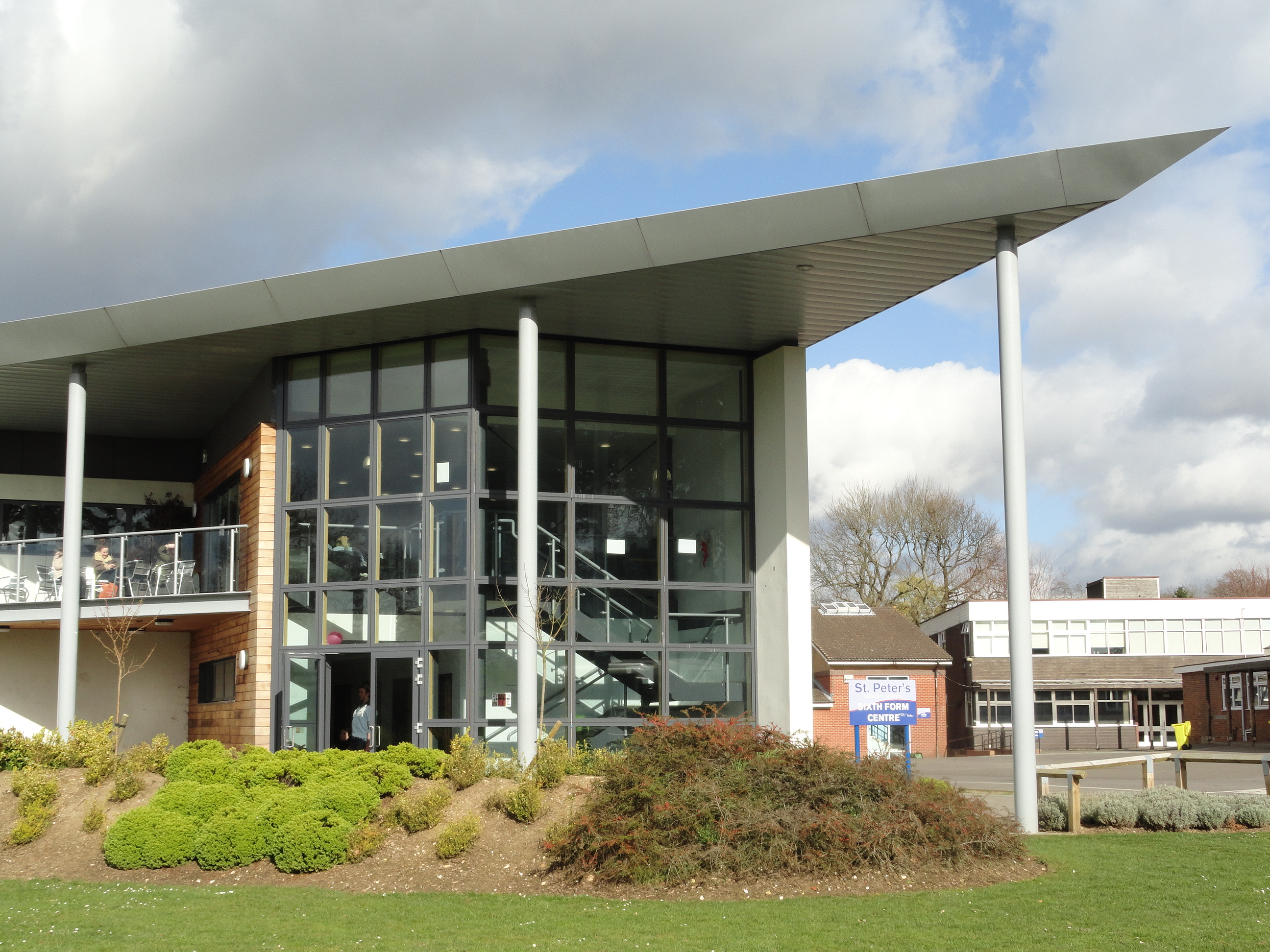
Sixth Form Centre, in 2014.

=== Theatre ===
In the early 2010s the school expended savings and received grants, such as from the registered charity named after Humphrey Richardson Taylor for music activities in education, to open its 'St Cecilia's Theatre'. after the Patron Saint of Music. As of now, the theatre has been built and is being used for productions put on by Drama Students and regular students.

== Sixth Form Centre ==
The school's enlarged sixth form centre opened in September 2011. The sixth form currently consists of 200 students, and benefits from a means-tested 16–19 bursary fund for bursaries. To prepare for further study or workplace positions the centre enabling students to take AS and A2 tutor-directed and assisted courses in many subjects.

== Structural Incidents ==
In January 2018 the new school building which was in construction caught on fire due to what was believed to be an incident with a gas cylinder. Get Surrey reported that "Flames could be seen rising from the side of the school, which is currently under construction". Firefighters were called.

== Catchment and key admissions factors ==

The school's geographical catchment areas are drawn and redrawn regularly, taking into account demand and the other admissions' criteria. Influencing redrawing and admissions policy are attendance at or residence within any of the nine parishes forming the Guildford Deanery and the ease to transportation to the school, relative to other schools. Four primary schools form with St Peter's its closest 'Family of Schools', preferential feeder schools, and are variously spread across the majority of the Boroughs of Guildford and Waverley forming the approximate south-west quarter of the county, numbered '6' and '7' in the map shown to the right.
