= Englefield =

Englefield may refer to:

== Geography ==
In England:

- Englefield, Berkshire, a village in the county of Berkshire, England
- Englefield Green, a village in the county of Surrey, England

In Wales:

- Englefield, an alternative name for the Cantref of Tegeingl in north Wales

== Sport ==
- Englefield Green Rovers F.C., an Association Football club based in Englefield Green

== Other ==
- Englefield (surname)
- Englefield Lodge, the first substantial home of Guise Brittan in Christchurch, New Zealand
- Englefield, East Maitland, a heritage-listed former inn and now residence at 49 Newcastle Street, East Maitland
