= St. Peter's Anglican Church =

St. Peter's Anglican Church may refer to:

== Australia ==
- St Peter's Anglican Church and Glebe Cemetery, East Maitland, New South Wales
- St Peter's Anglican Church, Richmond, New South Wales
- St Peter's Anglican Church, Sydney, New South Wales
- St Peter's Anglican Church, Barcaldine, Queensland

== Canada ==
- St. Peter's Anglican Church (West LaHave, Nova Scotia)

== Jamaica ==
- St Peter's Anglican Church, Falmouth, Jamaica

== New Zealand ==
- St Peter's Anglican Church, Onehunga, Auckland

== United States ==
- Cathedral Church of St. Peter (Tallahassee, Florida)
- St. Peter's Anglican Church (Butler, Pennsylvania)
- St. Peter's Anglican Church (Uniontown, Pennsylvania)

== See also ==
- St. Peter's Church (disambiguation)
- St. Peter's Episcopal Church (disambiguation)
