= Englefield, East Maitland =

Englefield
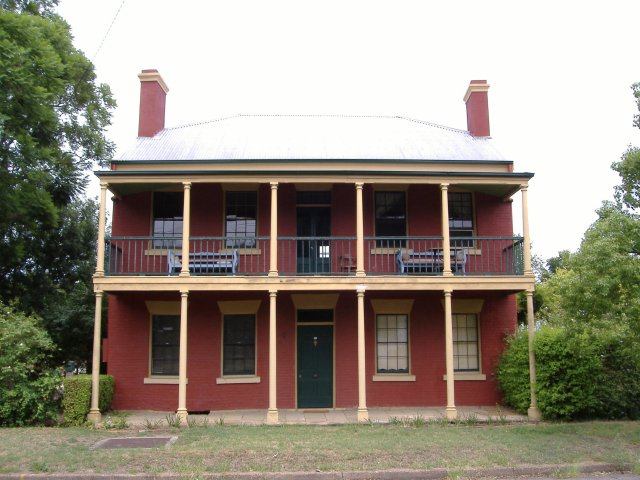

- Location within New South Wales Location within Australia
- 32.7442°S 151.5784°E
- Location: 49 Newcastle Street, East Maitland, City of Maitland, New South Wales, Australia

History
- Built: 1837–1837

Site notes
- Owner: Paul & Di Scherr

New South Wales Heritage Register
- Official name: Englefield; Black Horse Inn
- Type: state heritage (built)
- Designated: 30 April 2008
- Reference no.: 1772
- Type: House
- Category: Residential buildings (private)

Englefield is a heritage-listed former inn and now residence at 49 Newcastle Street, East Maitland, in the Hunter region of New South Wales, Australia. It was built in 1837. It operated as the Black Horse Inn from 1845 to 1878. It was added to the New South Wales State Heritage Register on 30 April 2008.

== History ==
The property now known as Englefield is believed to have been built by "Gentleman" John Smith c. 1837 at Wallis Creek on his Wallis Plains (now Maitland) farm. The land at Wallis Creek was originally "granted" to him (as 'tenant at will') by Governor Lachlan Macquarie in 1818, being one of the eleven early grants in the area permitting settlement to eleven "well-behaved" people.

Smith was an emancipated convict who was sent to the penal settlement at Sydney, arriving in 1810 on the "Indian" under the name of James Sidebottom (born 1787 at Manchester), but managed to escape back to England. Then, apparently finding little opportunity there, he got himself into trouble again and was transported a second time, arriving in 1814 on the General Hewitt, under the new name of John Smith and was sent to the Newcastle penal settlement where he confessed his past to Major James Morisset, the Commandant (documented in the Bigge Report of 1819-1821). He was made Chief Constable in Newcastle under Commandants Wallis and Morisset c. 1817 to 1823, and in 1818 he was allowed to take up land at Wallis Creek, being formally emancipated in 1819. In 1823 Smith opened the first licensed inn in the Hunter Valley, the Ship Inn in Newcastle, and established the first store in it. He formed an agreement with the Waterloo Company in Sydney for the provision of flour to his store and bought the sloop Elizabeth to trade between Newcastle and Sydney.

During this time he continued to expand his farm at Wallis Creek (and other parts of the Hunter) through grants and acquisition, and employed an overseer to run it, supplying wheat to the Commissariat in Newcastle in return for convict labour. In the 1828 Census, Smith was listed twice: in Newcastle as an innkeeper, and in Maitland as a farmer at Hazlewood of Wallis Plains (together with his wife Mary and their seven children) with a total acreage of 775 (of which 160 was under cultivation), 7 horses, 520 head of cattle and 300 sheep. Smith continued to expand his businesses in both locations and other parts of the state.

On 18 August 1837, Governor Sir Richard Bourke ratified Smith's previous grants at Wallis Creek for around 148 acres (refer original indenture with the house signed by both Smith and his wife Mary) and it was around this time that Smith placed an order for stone window sills consistent with those in the original house now known as Englefield, built on that grant. It has not yet been established whether Smith used this house as his Maitland residence, but its size and elegance for the period, its location on his farm within walking distance of both his mill (Smith's Flour Mill, rebuilt as a steam mill in 1844) and his mill workers' accommodation (Smiths Row, later leased by Caroline Chisholm), suggest that it may have been.

While many failed during the 1840s recession, Smith thrived on the available opportunities by "cashing up" and it was at this time (1 March 1843) that he and Mary sold the property to Henry Adams, innkeeper for one hundred pounds sterling, who then transferred his license for the Black Horse Inn from 46 Newcastle Street (across the road) to the property on 17 June 1845. It appears that around this time the house underwent extensions and alterations (as above) consistent with its conversion to an inn, which it remained until 1878 when Adams' sons re-converted it to a private residence and sold it (using the name Englefield for the first time).

In 1856 a private racetrack was established in the paddock to the rear of the house and the first horse races in East Maitland were held there on Queen Victoria's birthday that year.

During the 1870s, when the inn was leased by William Miles (licensee 1864-1877), the Black Horse Inn Races became a local fixture to celebrate special events such as the "Anniversary of the Colony". This was covered extensively in the Maitland Mercury, including the cooking of "kale cannon", a type of Irish stew, in the kitchen at the inn.

In 1901 the architectural firm of John W. Pender (architect of Anambah House, Cintra House and Belltrees) was engaged to carry out restoration works on the property and a detailed specification is held in the Pender archives at the University of Newcastle. In 1910 John Hickling bought the property and the Hickling family, who were hay farmers, occupied it until 1968. During the period 1968 to 1986, it fell into disrepair.

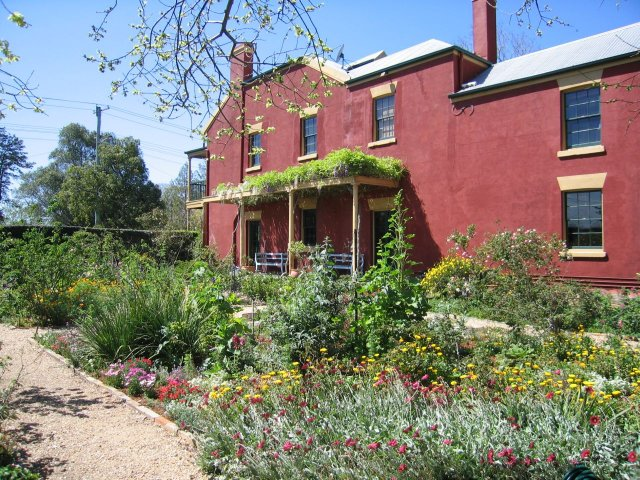
Gardens to one side of the house

In 1986 Peter Gibbs bought the property and received special permission (viz. building restrictions on the floodplain) from the then Minister for Planning, Laurie Brereton MP, who visited the property in 1987, to build a workshop in the grounds, for the purpose of restoring the house and conducting a business from there, conserving Australian colonial furniture and building museum copies from old growth Hunter River red cedar (Toona ciliata) trees. During the next twenty years, Englefield went through its second major overhaul (after the 1843 works) to restore the original 1837 fabric and to make sense of the 1843 alterations and additions by adapting it to modern living. The garden at Englefield is a reconstruction around four remaining old trees (including three jacarandas of the 1940s, an over-100 year old mulberry and an old garden plan from the 1920s/30s (drawn from memory by a member of the family who occupied the property at that time). In both 1996 and 2006 the re-constructed garden was opened through Australia's Open Garden Scheme.

A well at the rear of the building collapsed in 1997 and had to be filled in for safety reasons.

In February 2005, her Excellency the Governor of New South Wales, Marie Bashir and Sir Nicholas Shehadie made an official visit to Englefield.

Following completion of the conservation and restoration works, the owners nominated the house and garden to the State Heritage Register in 2006 with the support of Maitland City Council. Englefield (house and gardens) were listed on the State Heritage Register in April 2008.

== Description ==
=== House ===
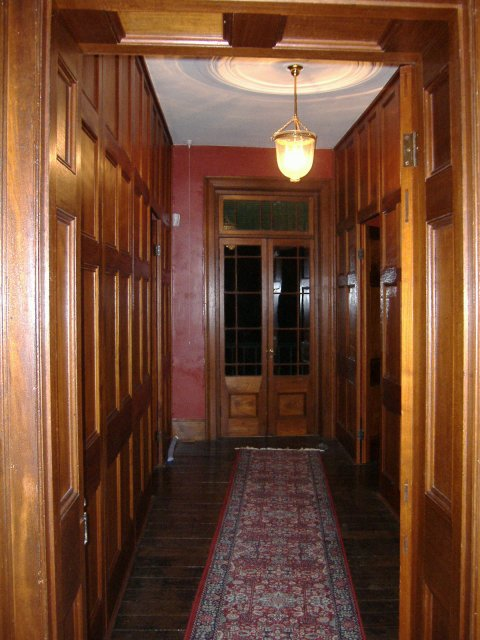
Panelling in the hallways

Englefield is a two-storey five-bay Georgian house with slender Doric columns to both levels of the verandah and sandstone flagging at ground level. It has six pane double hung sashes without horns and an iron roof with jerkin head gables. It is built of sandstock bricks held together with primitive lime mortar showing shell remnants, reinforced with animal hair. Its original shingle roof survives under the present iron.

The main structural walls are fourteen inches thick with internal panelled reveals. It has six-panelled cedar doors and cedar chimneypieces. There are seven bedrooms, including two attic rooms (in very original condition), and maid's room over the old kitchen. On the first floor, at the street front, a single room runs the full width of the house, divided into two rooms and a hall by removable cedar floor-to-ceiling panelling incorporating a hinged door leaf. By virtue of its having a central ceiling rose, fireplaces at each end and a continuous boarded floor, the room architecturally reads as a single space, and may derive from the English model of a large first floor reception room that can be adapted for day-to-day use. (This feature is found in a number of Maitland residences all built around the same time: Walli House, Roseneath, the Eckford house and outside Maitland most notably at Franklin House in northern Tasmania.)

It has a cellar, an early kitchen (that appears to pre-date the house, c. 1826) with wood-fired bread oven (and original hand made door), and back-to-back fireplaces with the adjoining flagged-floor scullery. Most of the lath and plaster ceilings remain, with original hand run ceiling roses in both the first floor reception room and the downstairs drawing room, the latter also retaining its original hand-run cornice. The house has an unusual architectural feature in that the front section of the house sits deliberately at an angle to the street front (less than 90). This appears to be due to the pre-existence of the kitchen, which may (along with a previous attached timber building) have been built at 90 degrees to a dirt road that had altered when the road was later formalised with stone gutters.

=== Site and gardens ===
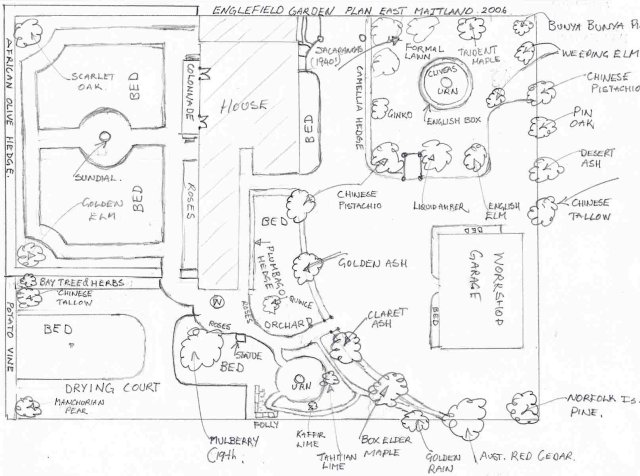
Site plan

The property consists of four lots, Lots 21-24, the house being on Lot 23. On the other three lots, a colonial-style garden has been reconstructed since 1986 by the current owner on architectural garden remains (including three jacaranda trees (Jacaranda mimosifolia) of the 1940s and a more than 100 year old mulberry (Morus sp.), and with loose reference to a garden plan of the 1920s/30s (drawn from memory by a member of the family who occupied the property at that time).

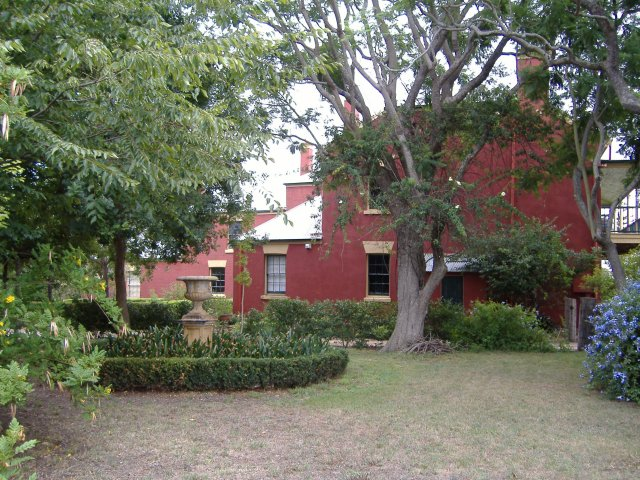
Another side view of house and gardens

Most plant varieties chosen have been known to exist in Australian gardens prior to 1850. The lack of grassed areas reflects the fact that "cottage beds" were easier to maintain than lawns. Areas are connected with gravel, stone or brick paths. An eccentric orchard under-planted with white evening primrose, alyssum and bulbs forms a second section. The orchard is bisected by a winding gravel path where azaleas grow. The left side of the orchard provides more circular forms and incorporates a stone folly to mark the ruin of a former stable and loft known to have existed at this position. The statue is placed at the intersection of various axes including those from the stair light window and back door. A third section is a drying court and kitchen garden (currently a herb garden and strawberry patch), which leads through the hedge to a formal parterre cottage garden with sundial centrepiece. The hedge is African olive (Olea europaea var.africana), a common form of colonial hedging. The seedlings were collected from surrounding paddocks and planted in 1989. The hedged parterre is being converted from self-seeding annuals to a rose garden of older European varieties (15th to 19th centuries), grown on their own roots (where available) and under-planted with hardy perennials.

No outbuildings survived the 1955 flood. A workshop was sympathetically constructed in the grounds in 1987 by the current owner. Original sandstone guttering runs along the opposite side of the street.

=== Condition ===
The property, as at 21 November 2006, has been restored to "house museum" standard, retaining many original features.

Englefield has integrity, with many original features and fabric.

=== Modifications and dates ===
- c. 1843: Alterations and additions, all in an early style and using early sandstock bricks and mortar, consistent with its adaptation as an inn, therefore probably done in 1843 when Henry Adams, innkeeper, bought the property and transferred his licence for the Black Horse Inn to the property. Changes as follows: (1) rear two-storey wall of northwest side of house removed, large beams inserted and two long rooms created (possibly men's dormitory upstairs and communal eating room downstairs), infilling area between original house and kitchen; (2) upper stair landing altered to provide more head room on main stairs, resulting in the simultaneous removal of the original upstairs service entrance, and new entrance knocked through from middle stair landing; (3) service stair removed (previously connecting rear lower southeast wing and servants' room diagonally above it) probably due to reduced space in upstairs servant's room when landing changed; (4) outside cellar entrance inserted or enlarged. Shortly after this, the kitchen roof was raised and a mezzanine level added; and a scullery was added to the rear of the kitchen;.
- 1878: Re-conversion to a private residence (notification in Maitland Mercury 5/10/1878; contractor was James Robinson). Key changes: (1) large street front window on front left side of house (over cellar) removed and two windows (matching right side windows) inserted; (2) cement rendering applied; (3) galvanised iron placed over roof shingles; (4) verandah replaced with a cast iron Victorian model.
- 1901: Work by Pender and Silk Architects of West Maitland: mostly restoration of existing structure, including the 1878 Victorian verandah; redwood sashes replaced worn cedar ones. Remaining redwood sashes are intrusive (Specification No. 399, Pender Archives, University of Newcastle).
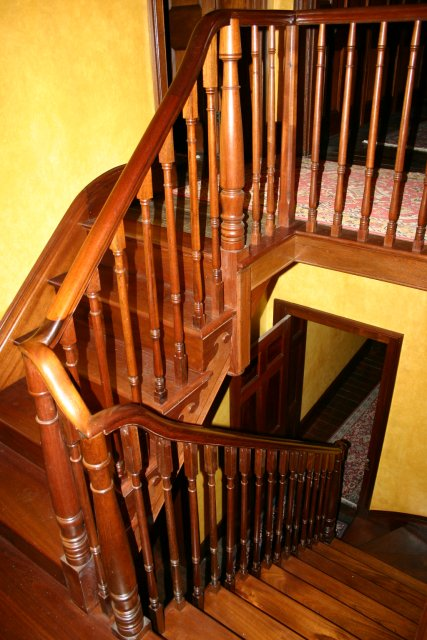
- Staircase
  1986 - 2006: All works supervised by Peter Gibbs; joinery restoration and garden reconstruction by Peter Gibbs:
1. Restoration of original 1837 fabric including the Georgian verandah, Georgian staircase (damaged by fire and 1955 flood), upstairs partitions, cellar, utility areas and restoration of original paint schemes (from scrapings) on exterior of house and in downstairs drawing room, dining room, library, hall (approximate), whitewash in kitchen and scullery;
2. reconstruction of gardens and building of workshop in grounds (1987);
3. Modifications to the 1843 northwest wing additions to rectify building faults, and to adapt it for modern use, while retaining architectural and social history of the extension:

(a) relocation/insertion of windows and doors in the northwest facing wall (doors from Trevallyn house demolished in the 1940s, and main windows from 1820s/30s house at 199 Newcastle Street [New England Highway] demolished in the 1980s), returning symmetry and sunlight that was lost when the 1843 extension went in;
(b) external sandstone colonnade constructed along northwest facing wall connecting doors at lower level and reconnecting garden to house (previously obstructed by 1843 extension);
(c) modern kitchen, and bathrooms installed.

== Heritage listing ==
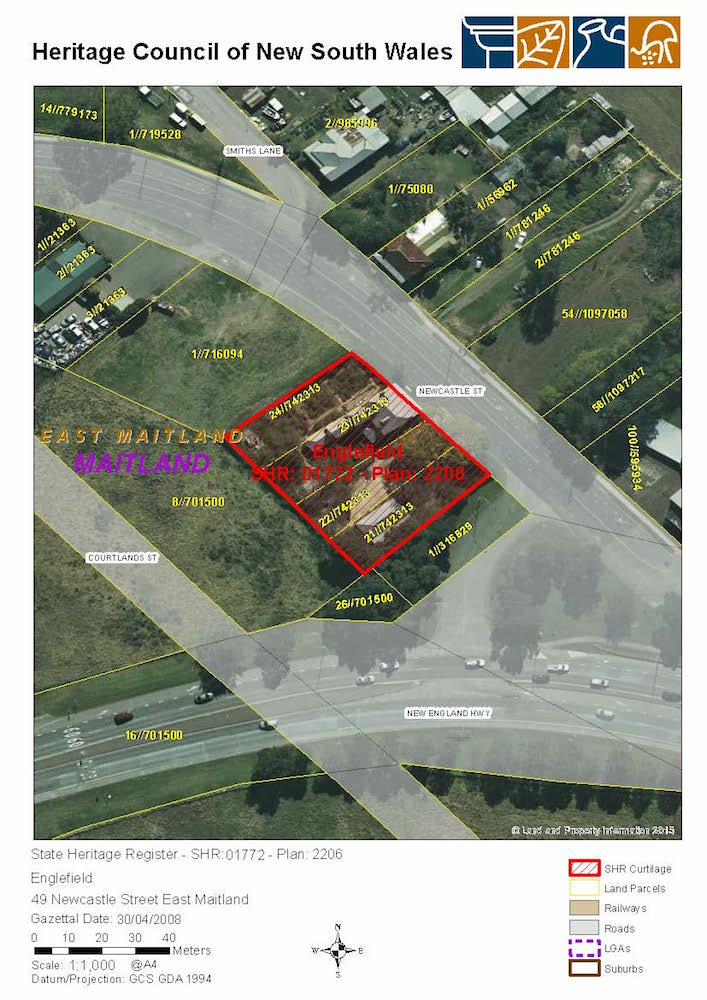
Heritage boundaries

Built in 1837 by John Smith on one of the eleven early 1818 "grants" from Governor Lachlan Macquarie at Wallis Creek, Englefield is a rare example of a pattern book, colonial, double pile Georgian house built in the style of an Irish farmhouse (jerkin head roof), retaining many original features (including its c. 1826 kitchen with working fireplace and wood-fired bread oven). It forms part of an important group of early colonial/Georgian houses clustered together on the road between Newcastle and Maitland in East Maitland. All of these houses are listed on the Register of the National Estate and can be seen from Englefield. In c. 1843 it underwent extensions and alterations at the rear (visible on the un-rendered southeast side of the northwest wing) to convert it to the Black Horse Inn, which achieved notoriety for the Black Horse Inn Races, and is significant in the social and economic history of inn development along the Newcastle - Maitland road. The significance of the property relates not only to its architecture and socio-economic history, but also to its association with Smith, an emancipated convict and an early entrepreneur in the Hunter Valley at a time when the Hunter was a key supplier of goods to the Sydney colony. The house stands on Smith's former Wallis Plains (now Maitland) farm, Hazlewood, close to two other important Smith buildings: Smith's Flour Mill and Caroline Chisholm Cottage (formerly Smith's Row), both listed on the NSW State Heritage Register.

Englefield was listed on the New South Wales State Heritage Register on 30 April 2008 having satisfied the following criteria.

The place is important in demonstrating the course, or pattern, of cultural or natural history in New South Wales.

Englefield is of state heritage significance as one of the earliest surviving buildings (with original kitchen/scullery) of the early days of NSW settlement, demonstrating (within the building) the upward mobility of early settlers and especially emancipated convicts (starting with its earlier kitchen, then the construction of a finer house and later additions). It also demonstrates the changing fortunes of early settlers, especially during the 1840s recession and the house's later conversion to an inn, capitalising on the increasing trade along the Newcastle-Maitland road.

The place has a strong or special association with a person, or group of persons, of importance of cultural or natural history of New South Wales's history.

Englefield is locally significant for its associations with John Smith (an emancipated convict and early entrepreneur operating between the Newcastle-Maitland area and Sydney), Governors Lachlan Macquarie and Sir Richard Bourke, architect John W. Pender.

The place is important in demonstrating aesthetic characteristics and/or a high degree of creative or technical achievement in New South Wales.

Englefield is of state heritage significance as an exceptional late Colonial period Georgian house/inn characterised by window and door proportions and detail, and slender Doric verandah columns. It is locally significant as a key townscape element on the bend of the New England Highway.

The place has strong or special association with a particular community or cultural group in New South Wales for social, cultural or spiritual reasons.

Englefield is locally significant for its strong association with the development of settlement in the Newcastle-Maitland area and the rise to prominence of Maitland (formerly Wallis Plains) when the Hunter was a key supplier of food, timber and goods to the Sydney colony.

The place has potential to yield information that will contribute to an understanding of the cultural or natural history of New South Wales.

Englefield is of state heritage significance for its ability to demonstrate the way of life of early settlers, the way they cooked, slept and entertained. Architecturally it shows materials, colour schemes (from original scrapings), detailing of joinery, and developments in these over time. I

In its current condition, Englefield further demonstrates the philosophy and techniques typical of heritage conservation projects of the late 1980s, when this project was conceived. At that time, reconstruction, as defined in Article 1 of the then-current version of the Burra Charter, was a more widely favoured practice than it has subsequently become. The work carried out at Englefield exemplifies the principles expressed in Articles 17, 18 and 19 respecting reconstruction. Later revisions of the Burra Charter incorporated caveats advocating a minimalist approach.

Locally significant attributes include: its skewed placement to the road signifies the changing nature of the original Newcastle-Maitland road, old coins, bottles, clay pipes, farm implements, ironwork and crockery frequently found in the garden and the original 1843 indentures signed by both John and Mary Smith and transferring the property to Adams which demonstrate the way land boundaries and ownership were defined and the way land was transferred at that time.

The place possesses uncommon, rare or endangered aspects of the cultural or natural history of New South Wales.

Englefield is of state heritage significance as a rare surviving example of a late colonial house/inn, built in the style of an Irish farmhouse and with many original features, including original kitchen and ovens.

The place is important in demonstrating the principal characteristics of a class of cultural or natural places/environments in New South Wales.

It is representative of the architecture and building styles of the 1830s. It is also representative of the philosophy and techniques of heritage conservation in the late 1980s when the current reconstruction was conceived and of the numerous places restored to "house-museum" standard at that time.
