= Englefield (surname) =

Englefield is an English surname. Notable people with this surname include the following:

- Cicely Englefield (1893–1970), English artist and author
- Sir Francis Englefield (c. 1520–1596), English Roman Catholic politician
- Frank Englefield (1878–1945), English footballer
- Sir Henry Charles Englefield, Bt (1752–1822), English antiquary and scientist
- Jarrod Englefield (born 1979), New Zealand cricketer
- Ronald Englefield (1891–1975), English poet and philosopher
- Sir Thomas Englefield (c.1455–1514), Speaker of the House of Commons, England
- Englefield baronets
