= Oldholme =

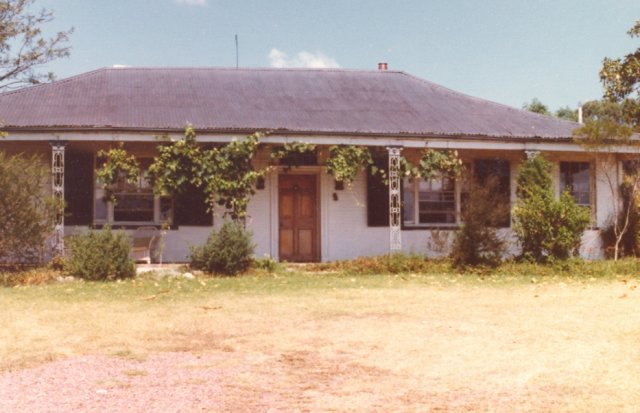

- Location within New South Wales Location within Australia
- 32.7525°S 151.5771°E
- Location: 12 Wallis Street, East Maitland, City of Maitland, New South Wales, Australia

History
- Built: 1835–1839

New South Wales Heritage Register
- Official name: Oldholme; Government cottage; Denny Day's cottage; Bonnie Doon
- Type: state heritage (built)
- Designated: 2 April 1999
- Reference no.: 136
- Type: Other – Government & Administration
- Category: Government and Administration

Oldholme is a heritage-listed residence at 12 Wallis Street, East Maitland, City of Maitland, New South Wales, Australia. It was built from 1835 to 1839. It is also known as Government Cottage, Denny Day's Cottage and Bonnie Doon. It was added to the New South Wales State Heritage Register on 2 April 1999.

== History ==
A small primitive structure was erected on this site in the early days of the township as a residence for dignitaries visiting the colonial settlement of Maitland. Governor Macquarie stayed there during his visit to Wallis Plains in 1818. In 1821 Macquarie visited again commenting that the new structure was a big improvement on the earlier one.

It was then called Lachlan Cottage in honour of the Governor's son, born in Sydney in 1813. The site is shown as Government Cottage on the 1829 map of Maitland by Surveyor White.

The third Government Cottage was built in 1827 and Governor Bourke stayed there during his 1833 Maitland visit. This cottage is thought to have been a short distance from the present cottage.

The present cottage was the fourth residence erected on the site was erected sometime between 1835 and 1839. It was used by the Maitland Police Magistrate, including Denny Day.

Magistrate Day won fame for capturing those responsible for the Myall Creek massacre in June 1838 and the Jewboy Davis gang in December, 1840. Day also laid the foundation stone of the Maitland Gaol in February, 1884 and also the foundation stones of Maitland Hospital and the Maitland Benevolent Society. Passing visitors were also accommodated, including Governor Gipps in 1839 and 1843 when it was grandly called "Government House".

Edward Denny Day was born in Ireland in 1801, the son of an Irish clergyman. He chose the Army as a career and was a lieutenant in the 62nd Regiment in India when he retired in 1834 because of ill Health and came to Sydney.

He was appointed clerk to the Executive Council and the following year to the Colonial Secretary's Department. He was appointed police magistrate at Maitland in September 1836 shortly after his marriage and came to Government Cottage.

He was appointed to Muswellbrook in 1837, resigned in 1840 returned to Maitland to take up business and again appointed police magistrate in Maitland in 1840.

While at Muswellbrook in 1838 Day was sent by Governor Gipps to search for the murderers of about 28 Aborigines who had been living on the banks of Myall Creek. The Myall Creek Massacre occurred on 10 June 1838 when a group of stockmen rounded up 28 Aboriginal men, women and children and killed them. Mr Day apprehended 11 white men, seven of whom were hanged following the subsequent trial. It is the first recorded hanging of white men for killing Aboriginal people. There was a public outcry at the hangings as the public believing that the killing of Aboriginals was not murder and white people should not be hung for such killings.

Day was also responsible for the apprehension of the notorious Jew Boy bushranger gang who had terrorised the Hunter districts for several months in 1840. In December 1840 the gang raided stations at Muswellbrook and Scone and during a raid on Dangar's store at Scone a man named John Graham was killed.

Day set out with a search party of 10 mounted men to search for the gang whom he found camped at Doughboy Hollow. The bushrangers were captured, found guilty and hanged.

In 1843, part of Oldholme's verandah was enclosed and a kitchen added.

After being appointed to other positions in the years after 1849, Day was returned to Maitland as police magistrate in 1858 and lived at Government Cottage, which he renamed Oldhome.

Edward Denny Day was the first private owner of Government Cottage. It remained in the possession of the Day family until about 1920.

It was known as "Bonnie Doon" at the time that Robert and Alice Blackman purchased it in the early 1950s, and retained that name for at least the twenty years that they owned the house. The Blackmans moved to Maitland from Neotsfield, Singleton in 1944 when that property was subdivided. Their initial house in Maitland was badly affected by the flood of 1949 and shortly after this (early 1950s) they bought Oldholme. The Blackmans rented an area to Gordon Mudd who operated it as a working farm. Later on some of the property was subdivided for residential use as there was a magnificent view overlooking Maitland township.

It was bought by D. J. and M. F. Benson in 1975 who began a programme of restoration. In 1977 the property was purchased by Dr Lionel Fredman, a lecturer from the University of Newcastle.

Oldholme was nominated for a Permanent Conservation Order in July 1978. A Permanent Conservation Order was gazetted over the property in 1981. It was transferred to the State Heritage Register on 2 April 1999.

== Description ==
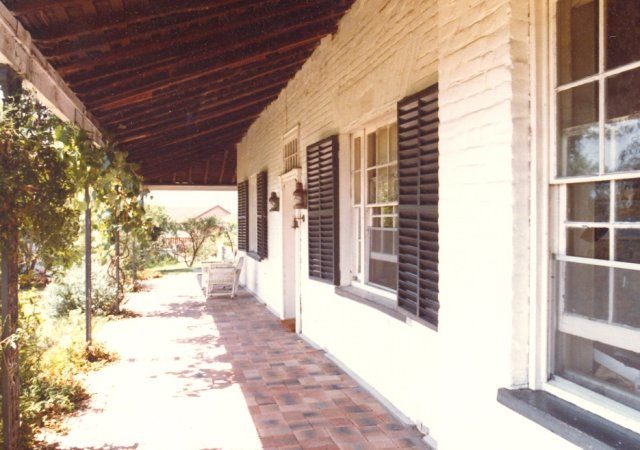
Looking along the front verandah

Oldhome is set in spacious grounds amongst mature trees including bunya-bunya pine (Araucaria bidwillii) and Moreton Bay fig (Ficus macrophylla).

Oldholme is a two-room, single story Georgian Colonial brick cottage, with verandah, with an interesting fanlight and door mouldings. Hipped iron roof extends over a verandah to three sides supported on later cast iron columns. One side of the verandah has been infilled with matching brickwork and joinery. The front door is of 6 panels with elaborate architrave with square fanlights above. On either side are two large double hung windows of triple opening sashes coupled in the pattern of 4:12:4 protected by wide timber louvered shutters.

At the rear is a separate kitchen wing, now converted.

== Heritage listing ==
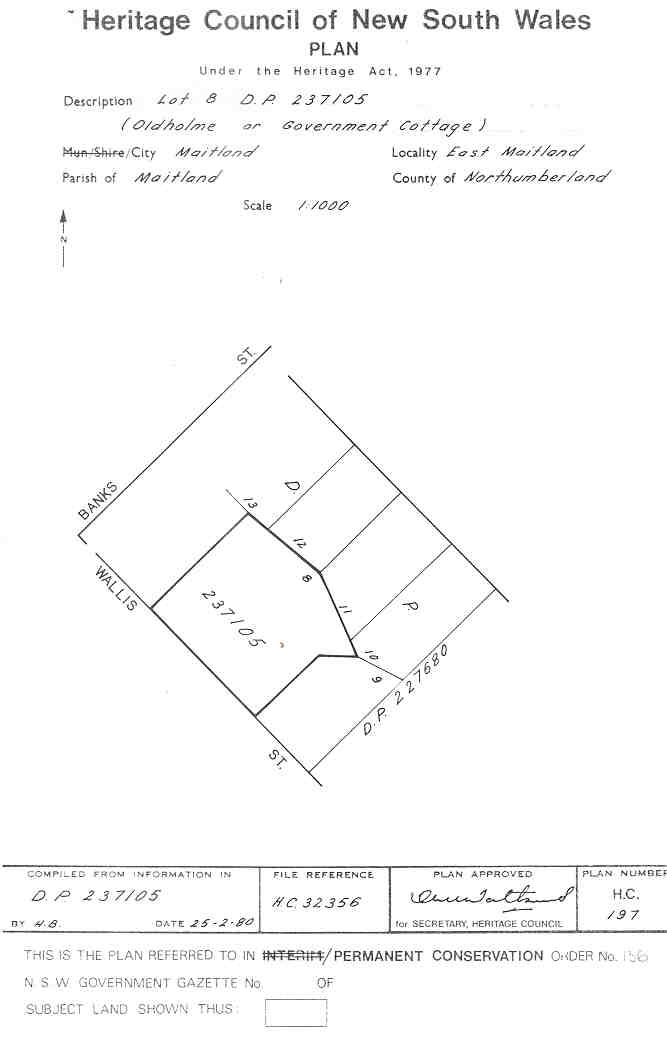
Heritage boundaries

Oldholme is a single storey Colonial Georgian brick cottage, built about 1838 as a residence for special visitors and visiting governors of New South Wales. It replaced earlier cottages built under the direction of Governor Macquarie. The building was the fourth government cottage to be built on the site, the first being constructed in 1816. The site of the cottage is significant as it reflects the beginnings of official settlement in the area. The current house was visited by Governor Gibb and was home to Police Magistrate Denny Day. Day was responsible for the prosecution of the Myall Creek Massacre perpetrators and the capture of Jewboy Davis gang.

Oldholme was listed on the New South Wales State Heritage Register on 2 April 1999.
