= 34–40 King Street, East Maitland =

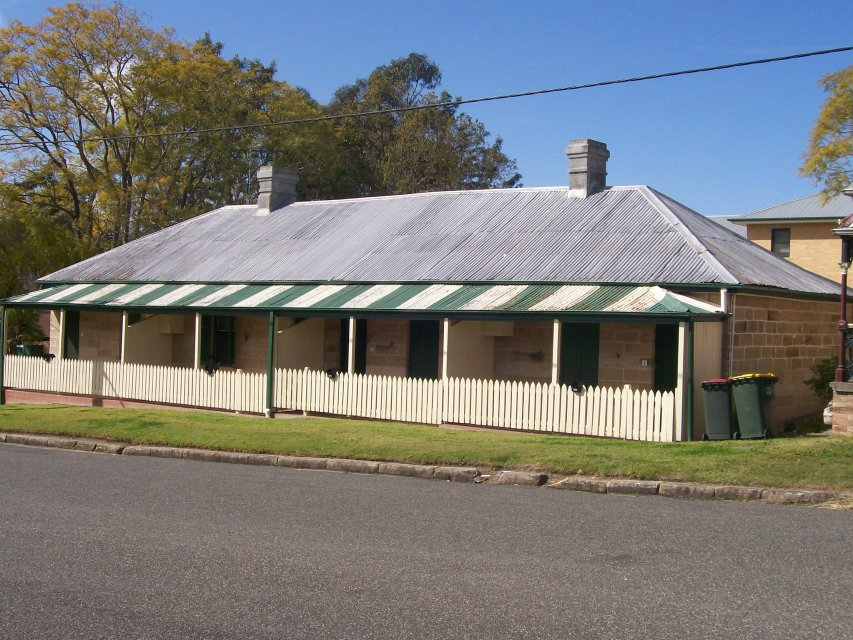

- Location within New South Wales Location within Australia
- 32.7488°S 151.5889°E
- Location: 34–40 King Street, East Maitland, City of Maitland, New South Wales, Australia

New South Wales Heritage Register
- Official name: Terrace
- Type: state heritage (built)
- Designated: 2 April 1999
- Reference no.: 297
- Type: Terrace
- Category: Residential buildings (private)

34–40 King Street is a heritage-listed row of terraced houses at East Maitland, in the Hunter Region of New South Wales, Australia. It was added to the New South Wales State Heritage Register on 2 April 1999.

== History ==
The terraces were built c. 1840.

== Description ==
It consists of a row of single-storey stone terraces in the Colonial Georgian style with corrugated iron hipped roofs.

The City of Maitland describes it as an "exceptional and relatively rare example in New South Wales of a small-scale nineteenth-century single-storey terrace row, and notes that it "represents the earliest phases of the town's residential development and a tangible record of the lifestyle of the working class in the mid-nineteenth century".

== Heritage listing ==
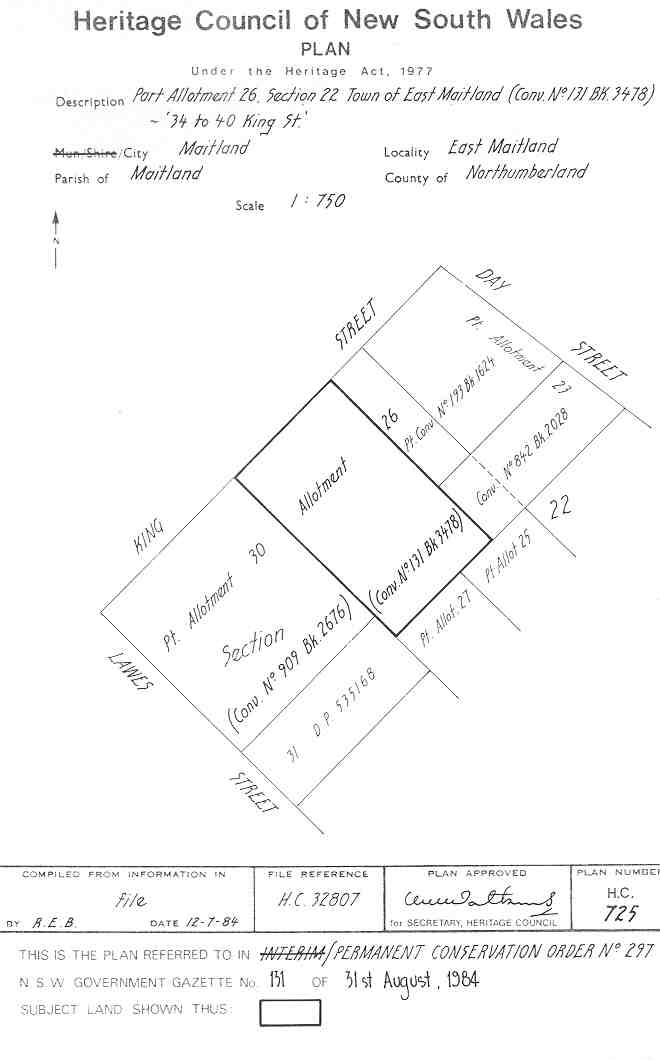
Heritage boundaries

34–40 King Street was listed on the New South Wales State Heritage Register on 2 April 1999.
