= East Maitland Post Office =

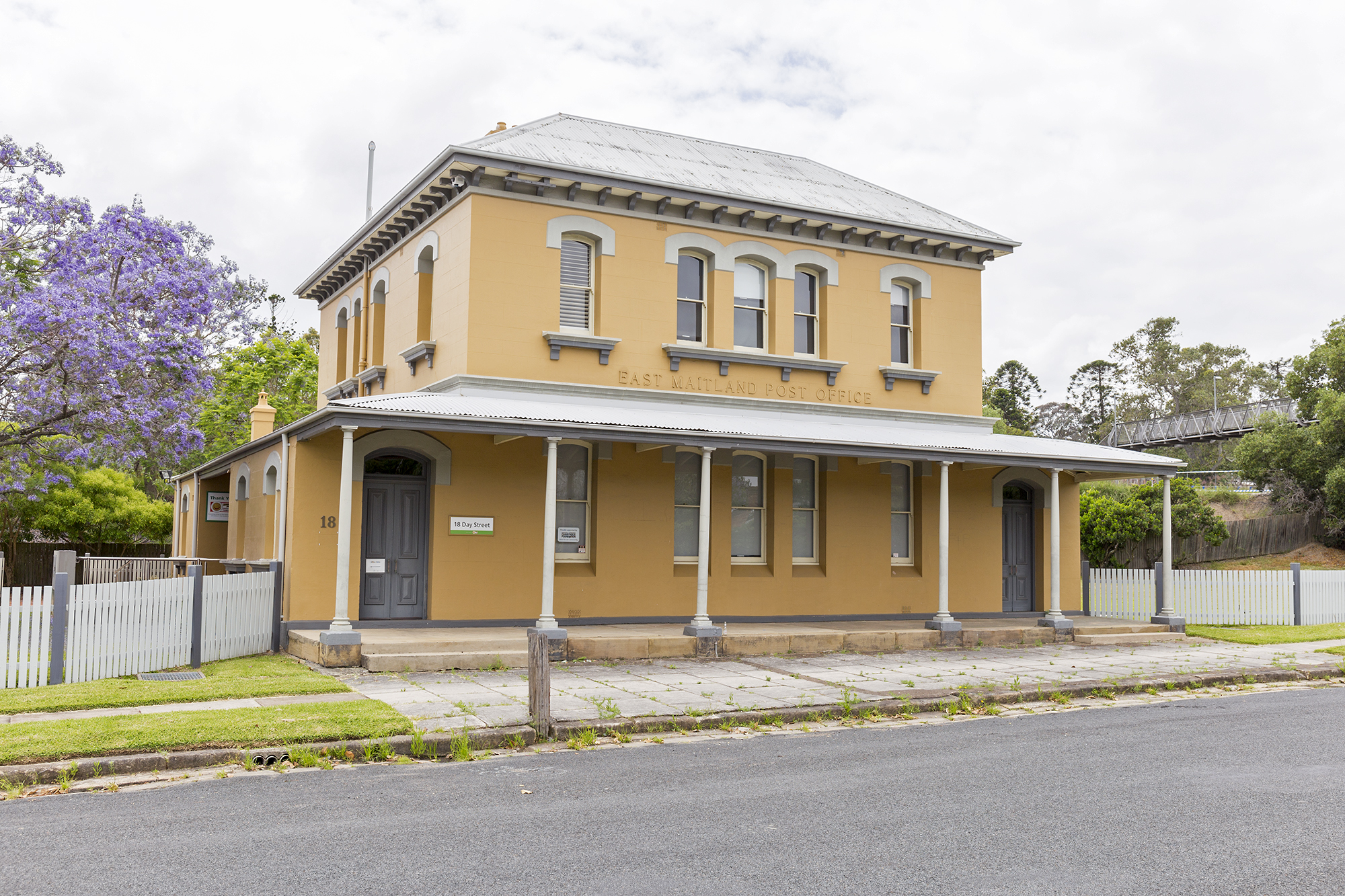
- View from Day Street

- Location within New South Wales Location within Australia
- 32.7459°S 151.5875°E
- Location: 18 Day Street, East Maitland, City of Maitland, New South Wales, Australia

History
- Built: 1870–1870

New South Wales Heritage Register
- Official name: Post Office & Stables (former); Post Office & Stables; East Maitland Post Office
- Type: state heritage (built)
- Designated: 2 April 1999
- Reference no.: 494
- Type: Post Office
- Category: Postal and Telecommunications

East Maitland Post Office is a heritage-listed former post office at 18 Day Street, East Maitland, in the Hunter region of New South Wales, Australia. It was built in 1870. It was added to the New South Wales State Heritage Register on 2 April 1999.

== History ==
Constructed c. 1870 the former post office was designed by the office of the Colonial Architect James Barnet.

The building ceased to be used as a post office on 3 August 1971. It was then used as a recreation and meeting room for the Maitland Branch of the Australian Postal Institute from 1971 to 1986.

On 12 May 1986 the Heritage Council was advised by the Department of Local Government and Administrative Services that the property was surplus to the requirements of the Australian Postal Commission and that it intended to sell the property.

A Permanent Conservation Order was placed over the site on 15 May 1987. It was transferred to the State Heritage Register on 2 April 1999.

On 1 June 1989, Heritage Council approval was given for repairs, refurbishment and change of use.

Heritage Council approval for repainting the building was given on 10 March 1998.

== Description ==
The Post Office is a two storied, rendered brick, Victorian Italianate building of symmetrical design with a single storey timber verandah having a curved iron roof which returns at the sides to form single storey office wings. The main roof is hipped in form and of corrugated iron, embellished at the eaves by timber brackets and moulded string course. There is a sandstone paved footpath at the street frontage. The site also includes a garage which was formerly a stable and a detached toilet block.

== Heritage listing ==
The former East Maitland Post Office is a fine example of a simple symmetrical but elegantly proportioned and detailed public building and comes from the office of one of the most important Government Architects, James Barnet. It is an impressive free standing building on a large site which together with its stables building provides important evidence of the history of the postal service in New South Wales.

Post Office & Stables was listed on the New South Wales State Heritage Register on 2 April 1999.
