= Goonoobah =

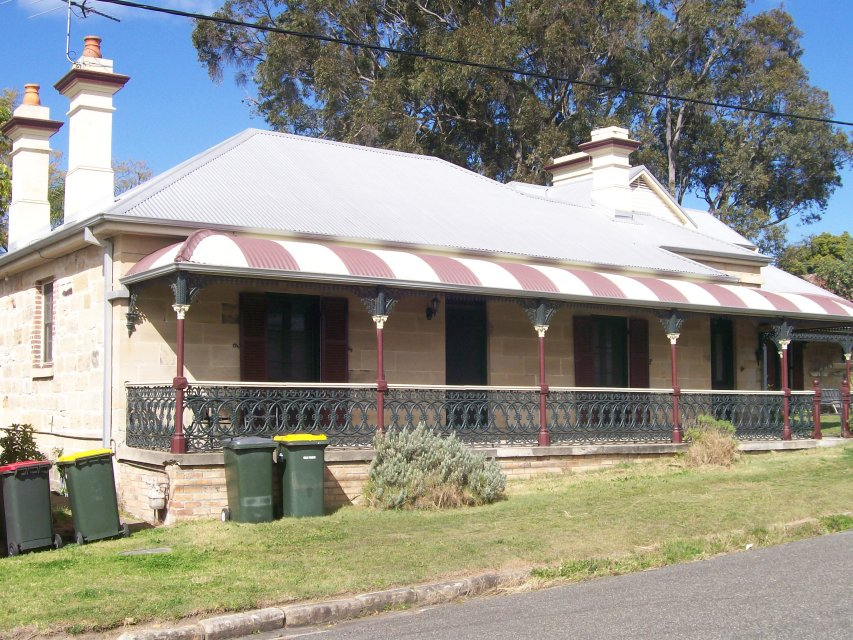

- Location within New South Wales Location within Australia
- 32.7489°S 151.5887°E
- Location: 42 King Street, East Maitland, City of Maitland, New South Wales, Australia

New South Wales Heritage Register
- Official name: Goonoobah & Woodlands
- Type: state heritage (complex / group)
- Designated: 2 April 1999
- Reference no.: 298
- Type: Other – Residential Buildings (private)
- Category: Residential buildings (private)

Goonoobah is an Australian heritage-listed residence in the Hunter region of New South Wales, located at 42 King Street, East Maitland. It was added to the New South Wales State Heritage Register on 2 April 1999.

== History ==
Goonoobah was built between June 1841 and May 1842 for George Furber, the owner of the George and Dragon Hotel. A central hallway and main entrance for both Goonoobah and the conjoined and also-heritage listed Woodlands was built in 1896, before both buildings were converted into a complex of three flats in 1930.

== Description ==
Goonoobah is one of two conjoined sandstone cottages in the Victorian Georgian style built on different alignments, with Woodlands set back further from the street. It has a large hipped iron roof and a bullnose verandah with cast-iron fence and columns; and French windows with shutters. There are three large stuccoed chimneys, two with pots.

== Heritage listing ==
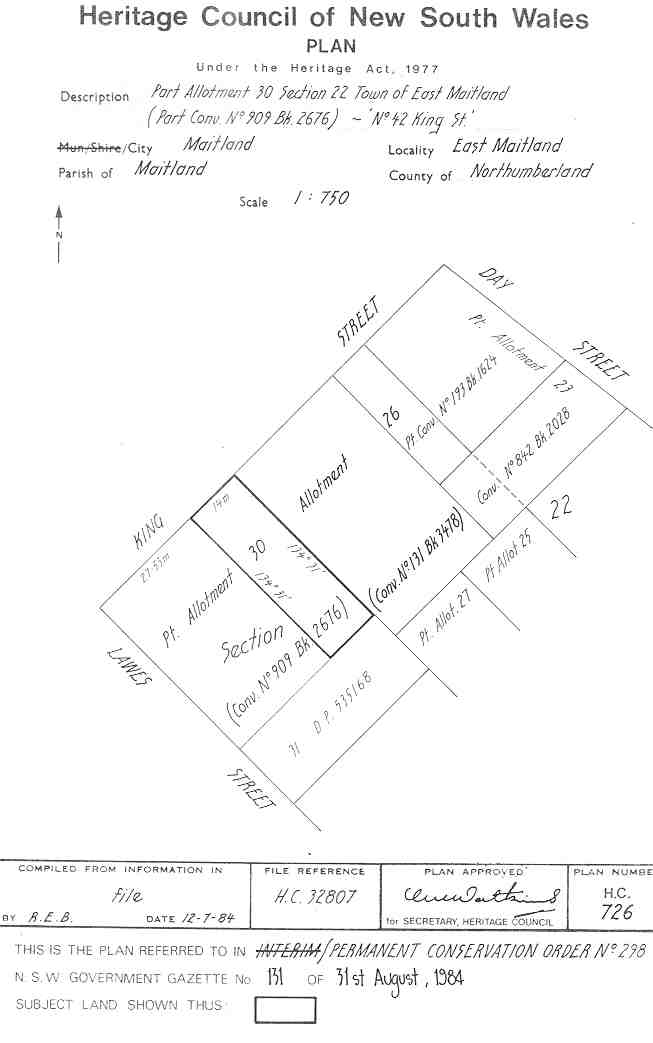
Heritage boundaries

Goonoobah was listed on the New South Wales State Heritage Register on 2 April 1999.
