= Caroline Chisholm Cottage =

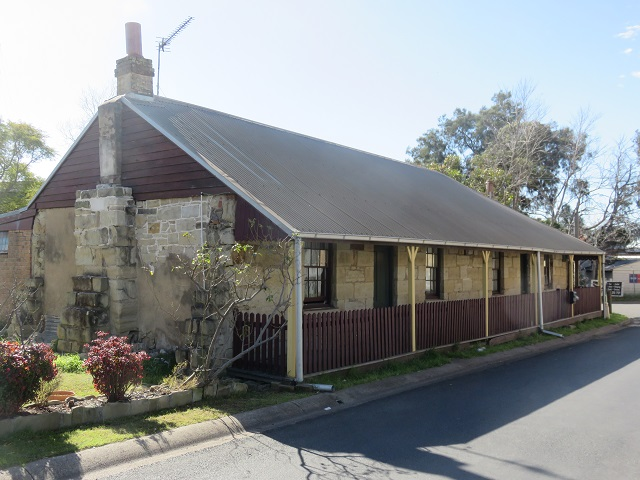

- Location within New South Wales Location within Australia
- 32.7465°S 151.5800°E
- Location: 3 Mill Street, East Maitland, City of Maitland, New South Wales, Australia

History
- Built: 1831–1835

New South Wales Heritage Register
- Official name: Caroline Chisholm Cottage; Maitland hospital; East Maitland Immigrants' Home; Maitland Benevolent Asylum; Caroline Chisholm Barracks (fmr.)
- Type: state heritage (built)
- Designated: 2 April 1999
- Reference no.: 500
- Type: Cottage
- Category: Residential buildings (private)
- Builders: John Smith

Caroline Chisholm Cottage is a heritage-listed residence and former hospital and benevolent asylum at 3 Mill Street, East Maitland in the Hunter region of New South Wales, Australia. It was built from 1831 to 1835 by John Smith. It is also known as Smith's Row, the Maitland Benevolent Asylum, the East Maitland Immigrants' Home and the Caroline Chisholm Barracks. It was added to the New South Wales State Heritage Register on 2 April 1999.

== History ==
East Maitland was planned in 1828 by the Surveyor George Bayal White. Originally named Maitland, the town was to be a centre that could provide marketing services and legal order for the growing population of the area. The cottage was constructed by John Smith between 1831 and 1835 as part of five cottage terraces which were rented to working-class people.

In March 1842, the first two cottages, now being the only remaining structure of the terrace, were rented by Caroline Chisholm as the East Maitland Immigrant's Home, and used as a hostel for homeless immigrants who travelled to the Hunter region in search of work.

Caroline Chisholm was born in 1808 near Northampton, England. She was reared in the tradition of Evangelical philanthropy and at 22 married Captain Archibald Chisholm on the condition that her philanthropic work should continue. The Chisholms arrived in Australia in 1838 and she dedicated herself to assisting immigrants, unemployed and the homeless.

In November 1842 the building was converted into the first hospital in the district, known as the Maitland Benevolent Asylum. By October of the following year the demands made upon the building became too great and the service was moved to a new location. The Immigrants' Home continued to function at 1 Smith Street (now Mill Street) for at least ten years.

In 1985 the owner of the cottage, announced it intended to move the cottage and place it in a historic park on the outskirts of East Maitland. The local community made representations to the Heritage Council. Following discussions with Maitland Council and the owner of the building, the Heritage Council recommended a Permanent Conservation order be placed over the building. A Permanent Conservation was gazetted in 27 March 1987. On 2 April 1999 the building was transferred onto the State Heritage Register.

It had been in poor condition when assessed in 1985, but was restored by a new owner in the mid-1990s.

== Description ==
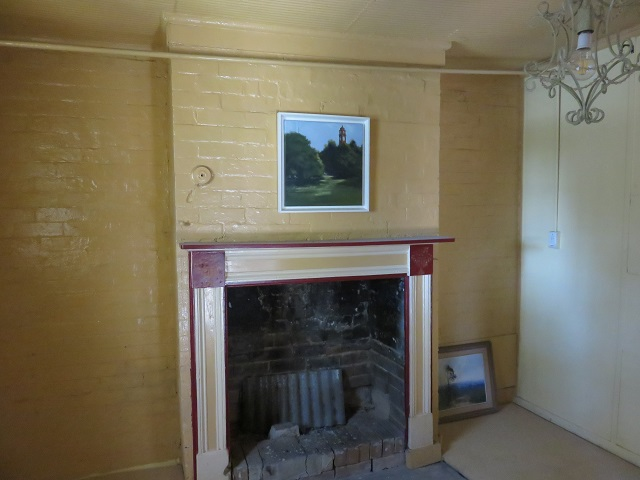
Interior

A single storey residence built of sandstone walls, timber floors and roof frames with a timber shingle roof that has been covered with corrugated iron.

Consists of four front rooms, facing Mill Street on the west side, a room formerly used as a kitchen on the north east corner of the building and a new kitchen to the south of the old, in the middle of the eastern side and a bathroom on the south east corner.

There are no passageways and rooms are connected to one another by simple doorways. There are two entrances into the building, located on the north and south end of the timber and corrugated iron verandah on the west side.

A large double hung door is also located in the centre of the eastern elevation of the building which opens onto the garden area.

It is a very simple, humble cottage with a minimum of decoration. Only the joinery of two of three fireplaces and some of the architraves provide any evidence of style.

The windows, which are a very simple colonial style, and the stark nature of the rest of the fabric indicate that the building was built for a minimum cost for the use of low income earners.

=== Modifications and dates ===
- 1831–35 – Construction of terrace of five cottage terraces, rented to working-class people.
- March 1842 – The first two cottages, now being the only remaining structure of the terrace, rented by Caroline Chisholm as the East Maitland Immigrant's Home, and used as a hostel for homeless immigrants who travelled to the Hunter region in search of work. Likely modifications to allow this use.
- 15 April 1854 – Smith subdivided the land and sold the property that now contains the Barracks to Henry Gore

== Heritage listing ==
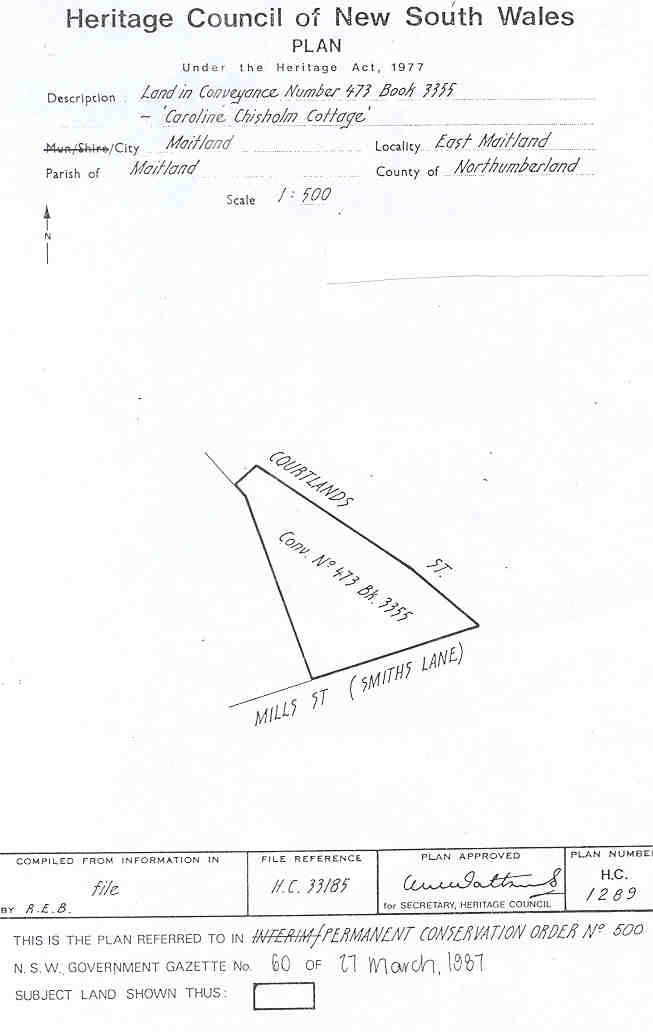
Heritage boundaries

The cottage is significant for its close association with Caroline Chisholm, one of Australia's greatest pioneering women, who rented 1 and 3 Smith's Row (Mill Street) and converted it into a single cottage to shelter homeless immigrants in the district. At present it is the only known building to still survive that was associated with Caroline Chisholm. It is one of the oldest buildings in the district and demonstrates a way of life that was typical of the working class of Maitland at that time. It was the site of Maitland's first hospital in 1842 and 1843, known as the Maitland Benevolent Asylum. The construction method used for the cottage is of scientific interest as it is an example of a cheap house erected during the early development of a rural New South Wales town during the 1830s.

Caroline Chisholm Cottage was listed on the New South Wales State Heritage Register on 2 April 1999 having satisfied the following criteria.

The place is important in demonstrating the course, or pattern, of cultural or natural history in New South Wales.

The cottage is significant for its close association with Caroline Chisholm, one of Australia's greatest pioneering women, who rented 1 and 3 Smith's Row (Mill Street) and converted it into a single cottage to shelter homeless immigrants in the district. It is one of the oldest buildings in the district and demonstrates a way of life that was typical of the working class of Maitland at that time. It was the site of Maitland's first hospital in 1842 and 1843, known as the Maitland Benevolent Asylum. It is associated with the nearby Smith's Flour Mill as it is likely that the cottage was built for workers in the Flour Mill.

The place has potential to yield information that will contribute to an understanding of the cultural or natural history of New South Wales.

The construction method used for the cottage is of scientific interest as it is an example of a cheap house erected during the early development of a rural New South Wales town during the 1830s.

The place possesses uncommon, rare or endangered aspects of the cultural or natural history of New South Wales.

At present it is the only known building to still survive that was associated with Caroline Chisholm.
