= Woodlands, East Maitland =

Woodlands
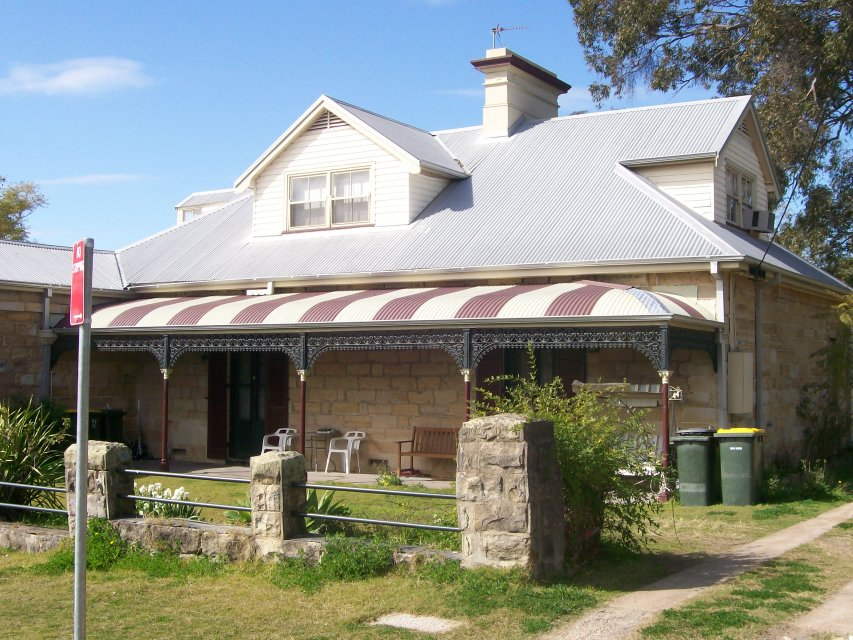

- Location within New South Wales Location within Australia
- 32.7489°S 151.5887°E
- Location: 44 King Street, East Maitland, City of Maitland, New South Wales, Australia

New South Wales Heritage Register
- Official name: Woodlands
- Type: state heritage (built)
- Designated: 2 April 1999
- Reference no.: 299
- Type: historic site

Woodlands is a heritage-listed residence at 44 King Street, East Maitland, City of Maitland, New South Wales, Australia. It was added to the New South Wales State Heritage Register on 2 April 1999.

== History ==
Woodlands was built in 1843 by J. Chamber. A central hallway and main entrance for both Woodlands and the conjoined and also-heritage listed Goonoobah was built in 1896, before both buildings were converted into a complex of three flats in 1930.

== Description ==
It forms one of two conjoined sandstone cottages in the Victorian Georgian style built on different alignments, along with neighbouring Goonoobah, which is closer to the street than Woodlands. It features shuttered French windows, cast iron decoration to the verandah, and bullnosed verandah roof. The main roof is hipped and of iron and has three later unsympathetic dormer windows to the front and sides.

== Heritage listing ==
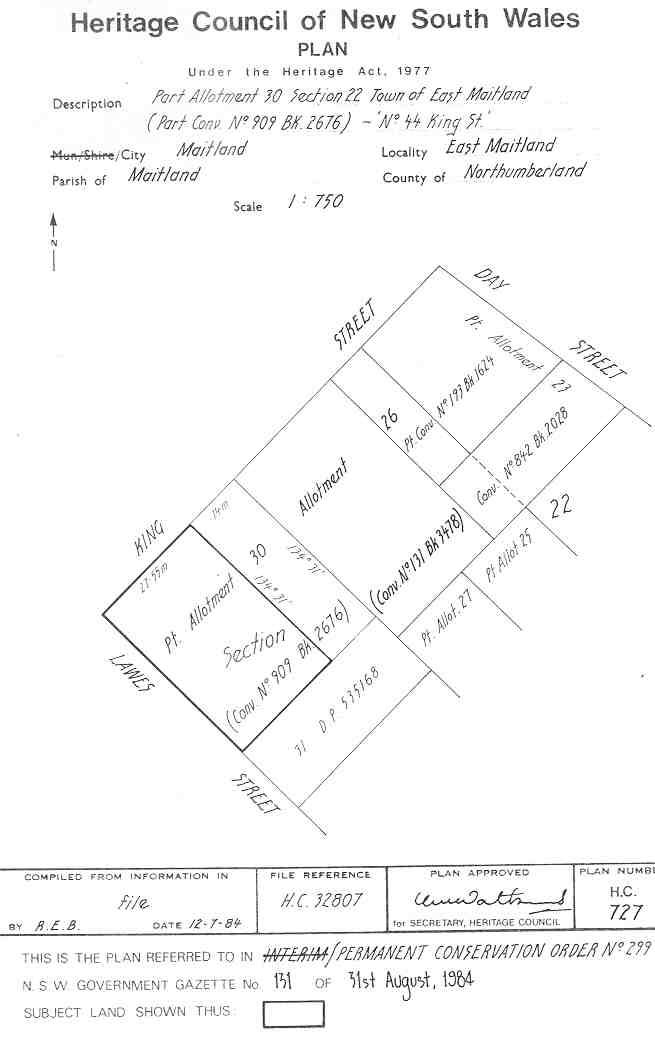
Heritage boundaries

Woodlands was listed on the New South Wales State Heritage Register on 2 April 1999.
