= East Maitland Police Station =

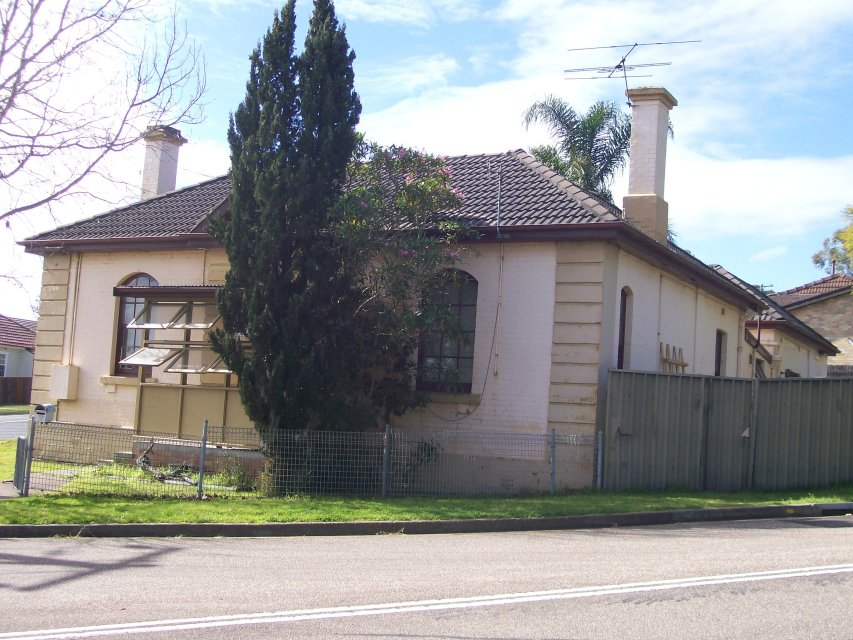

- Location within New South Wales Location within Australia
- 32.7444°S 151.5886°E
- Location: 20 John Street, East Maitland, City of Maitland, New South Wales, Australia

History
- Built: 1870–1871

Site notes
- Owner: NSW Police Service

New South Wales Heritage Register
- Official name: Police Station (East Maitland); East Maitland Police Lock-up (1870–c. 1914); Police Residence (c. 1914–1998)
- Type: state heritage (built)
- Designated: 2 April 1999
- Reference no.: 1016
- Type: Police station
- Category: Law Enforcement

East Maitland Police Station is a heritage-listed former police station located at 2 John Street, East Maitland, in the Hunter region of New South Wales, Australia. It was built from 1870 to 1871. It was used as a police lock-up from 1870 to c. 1914 and as a police residence from c. 1914 to c. 1998. It is now a private residence. It was added to the New South Wales State Heritage Register on 2 April 1999.

== History ==
Tenders for the construction of a new police station on the jail reserve were called in the "Government Gazette" of 2 December 1870. The new building was completed in 1871, with foundations of local stone, brick walls, blue gum and tallowwood carpentry and cedar joinery. The cells and charge-room originally faced John Street.

In 1914, the building was converted into a police residence in response to a growing population and changing community attitudes. The former cells and charge room now became three bedrooms and a sitting room and a verandah were added at the front. New cells and prisoners' yard were constructed behind the building. It was re-classified as a residence for the superintendent of the adjacent Maitland Gaol c. 1968. It was isolated from the rest of the jail reserve for many years, but in 1972 two houses for jail officers were built between it and the prison.

== Description ==
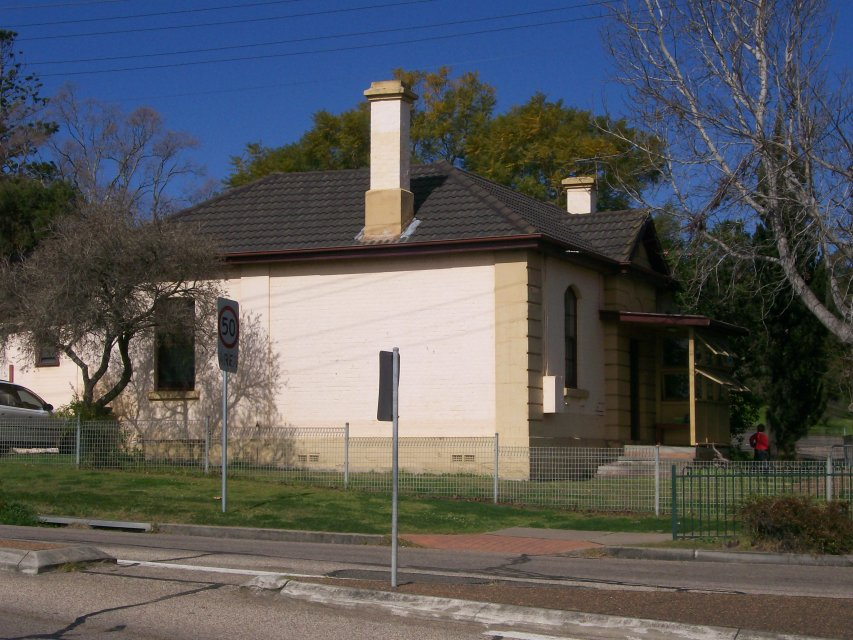
Viewed from the side

It is a single-storey rendered brick cottage in the Victorian Classical style with lock-up.

=== Condition ===
The residence retains many of its significant features including its basic form, joinery and two chimneys. The cells and yard remain, however the yard is roofed over to provide a garage. The setting of this small complex is somewhat compromised by the loss of the original perimeter wall which has been replaced by a combination of unsympathetic fence types in timber, aluminium and wire. The front garden and grounds give few clues to the original walled setting and plants conceal the residence from view. The concrete tile roof (probably originally slate) and colour scheme internally and externally detract from its significance and ability to appreciate the place.

== Heritage listing ==
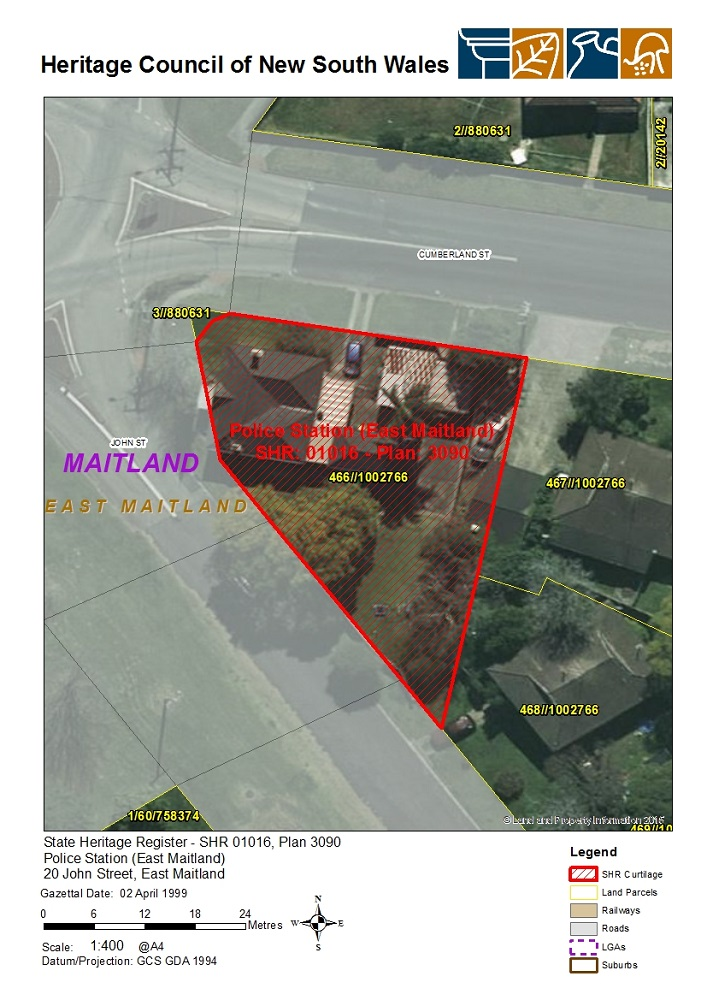
Heritage boundaries

The former East Maitland Police Lock-up is of considerable significance because it is well built, of local materials and adds to the coherent historic character of the Gaol/Courthouse group, it demonstrates the changes that have occurred in the police service over 120 years, and it demonstrates a standard Police Lock-up design, extensively used in the Hunter Valley, in the context of a police and jail precinct.

East Maitland Police Station was listed on the New South Wales State Heritage Register on 2 April 1999 having satisfied the following criteria.

The place is important in demonstrating the principal characteristics of a class of cultural or natural places/environments in New South Wales.

The lock-up/residence, when compared with the more recent prison officers' residences, is indicative of the changing conditions of police service since 1871. Existing close by the 1972 (former) police station it allows comparison between East Maitland police stations a century apart. This type of building is relatively common in the Hunter Region. It is not known how many function today as police stations or related uses, however, it is thought that most have been converted to residences. While not rare, this building is representative of its type and significant as part of the law and order precinct.
