= East Maitland, New South Wales =

East Maitland Maitland, New South Wales
- Coordinates: 32°45′6″S 151°35′24″E
- Population: 11,860 (2021 census)
  - Density: 744.0/km^{2} (1,927.1/sq mi)
- Postcode(s): 2323
- Area: 15.94 km^{2} (6.2 sq mi)
- Location: 162 km (101 mi) N of Sydney; 32 km (20 mi) NW of Newcastle
- LGA(s): City of Maitland
- Region: Hunter
- State electorate(s): Maitland
- Federal division(s): Hunter
Suburbs around East Maitland:
| Horseshoe Bend | Lorn | Tenambit |
| South Maitland | East Maitland | Chisholm |
| Louth Park | Ashtonfield | Metford |

East Maitland is a suburb in Maitland, New South Wales, Australia.

The traditional owners and custodians of the Maitland area are the Wonnarua people.

== Commercial areas ==
Green Hills is a major commercial district called which includes the large Stockland Green Hills and The Pavilion which features Aldi, Rebel, Repco and the East Maitland Library.

There are also shops near Victoria Street railway station.

== Schools ==
- St Joseph's Primary School, co-ed Catholic primary school at 57 King Street
- East Maitland Primary School, co-ed government primary at 32 William Street
- Linuwel School, alternative co-ed private K–12 located at 133 Morpeth Street
- Maitland High School (formerly Maitland Boys' High School), co-ed government secondary school at 32 High Street
- Maitland Grossman High School (formerly Maitland Girls' High School), co-ed government secondary school on Cumberland Street

== Transport ==
East Maitland is on the New England Highway and it has two railway stations, Victoria Street and East Maitland. Both stations are served by NSW TrainLink. Hunter Valley Buses provides bus service.

=== Pitnacree Bridge ===
Opened to cross the Hunter River in 1866. It was located on Pitnacree Road to the Harry Boyle Bridge around 500 meters north east. It was designed as people can travel from Woodville to East Maitland. In 1951 flooding changed the course of the river meaning the bridge was no longer used. It was demolished in 1962 with no above evidence of its existence.

== Demographics ==
According to the 2016 census of Population, there were 11,782 people in East Maitland.

- Aboriginal and Torres Strait Islander people made up 4.4% of the population.
- 85.5% of people were born in Australia. The next most common countries of birth were England 2.0% and New Zealand 0.9%.
- 90.2% of people spoke only English at home.
- The most common responses for religion were Catholic 26.0%, No Religion 24.6% and Anglican 22.7%.

== Heritage listings ==
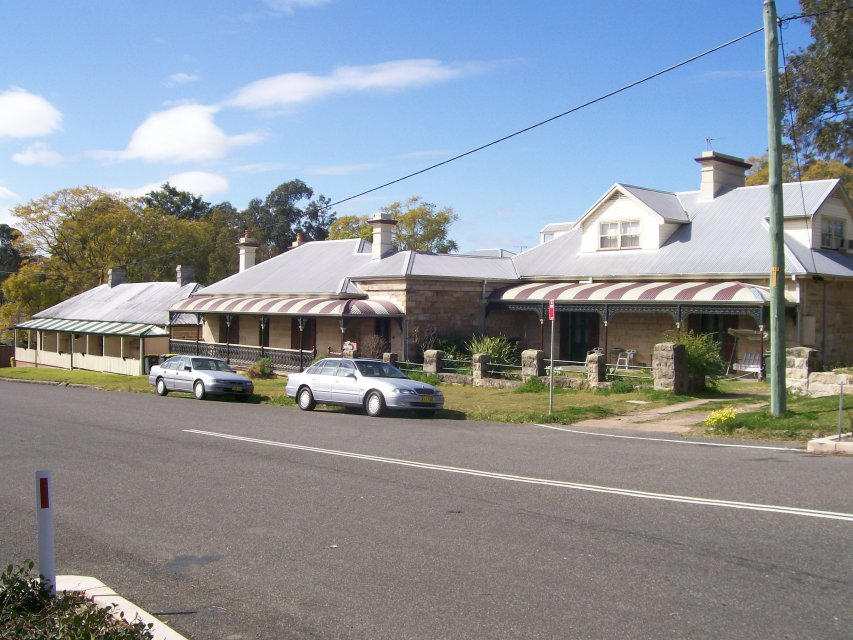
View along King Street of three heritage-listed properties

East Maitland has a number of heritage-listed sites, including:

- 18 Day Street: East Maitland Post Office
- John Street: Maitland Gaol
- 20 John Street: East Maitland Police Station
- 34–40 King Street: 34–40 King Street
- 42–44 King Street: Goonoobah
- 44 King Street: Woodlands
- Main Northern railway: East Maitland railway station
- Main Northern railway: Victoria Street railway station
- 3 Mill Street: Caroline Chisholm Cottage
- 91 Newcastle Road: Smith's Flour Mill
- 49 Newcastle Street: Englefield
- 12 Wallis Street: Oldholme
- 47 William Street: St Peter's Anglican Church and Glebe Cemetery

== History ==
The traditional and custodians of the land are the Wonnarua people.

Approximately 1818 were when the first European settlers arrived. Maitland was central to trade and the growth of the Hunter Region.

Tom White Melville Winder was one of the largest proprietors on the Hunter. Winder held 7400 acres (2995 ha) by 1828 and by 1831 had acquired another 2600 acres (1052 ha). The area of the land grants included areas in the Maitland LGA.

The “Windermere” estate including the grounds were where a cedar forest was used for building materials and other logs were sent along the Hunter River to trade and send cedars to England and Sydney. Windermere estate was established before East Maitland and West Maitland were established. Windermere was a hub for cedar trade with Winder having his own fleet of vessels

The history of Maitland is reflected in the buildings including government buildings being established. There are many historic and heritage buildings in the area. Many of these buildings show evidence of the abundant cedar timbers in the area, using these for buildings and furniture. Buildings also use local sandstone.

Maitland grew steadily and quickly became an important regional centre in the Colony. Growth was rapid but recent growth was slower once sea routes were taken over by rail/road routes as preferred modes of transportation. Also original supplies such cedars were used/depleted and other areas of Australia were opened up. Also the waterways today are lessened in size/volume with many formerly abundant creeks dried up or now small drains unable to be traversed by boat.

== Notable people ==
- Herbert Evatt, Leader of the Australian Labor Party and Justice of the High Court
- Frederick Lancelot Nott, Member of the Queensland Legislative Assembly
- Les Darcy, world champion boxer, is buried in the Catholic Section of East Maitland Cemetery.
