= St Peter's Anglican Church and Glebe Cemetery =

Church in New South Wales, Australia

St Peter's Anglican Church
- Saint Peter's Anglican Church
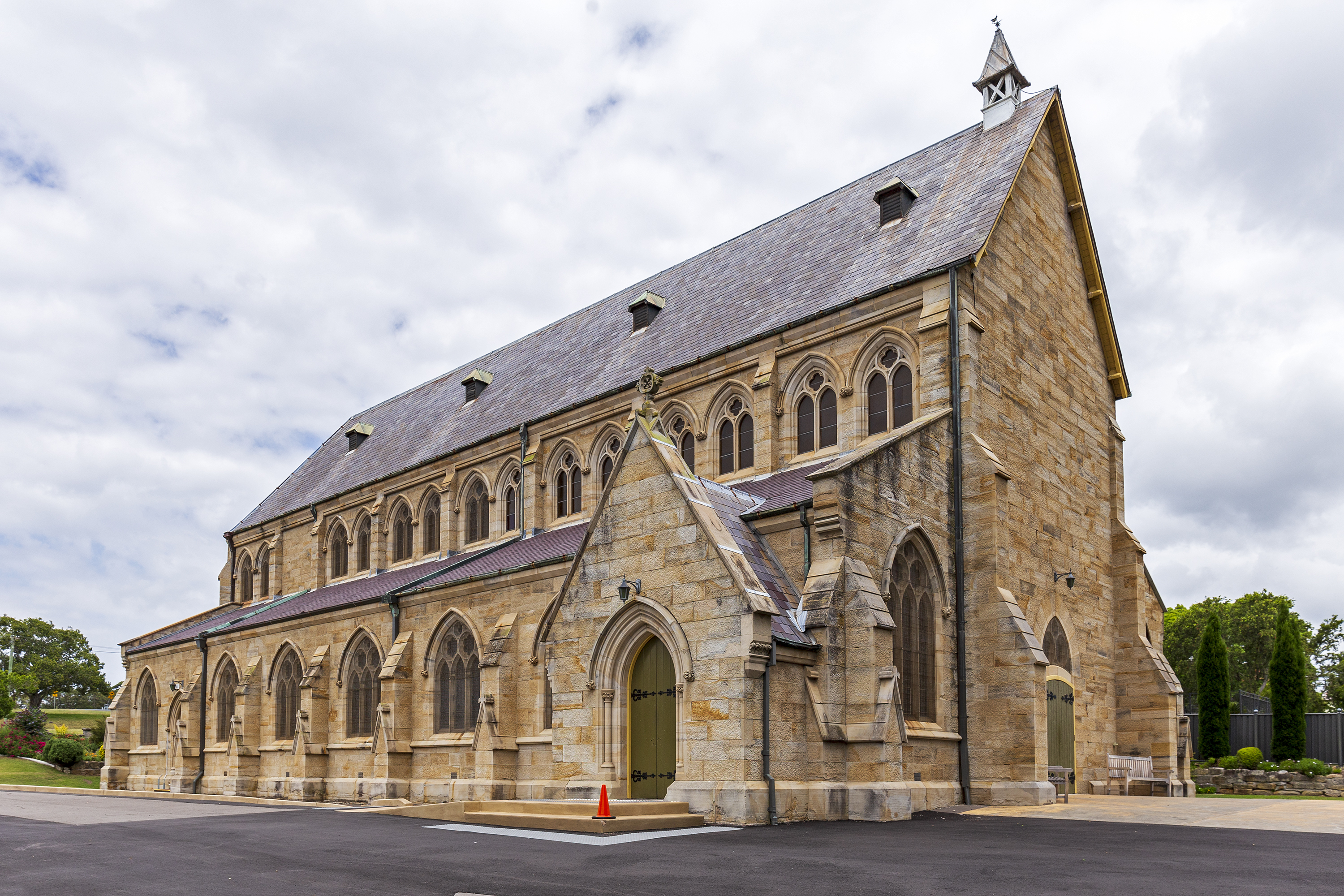
- St Peters Anglican Church, East Maitland, NSW

- Location in New South Wales
- 32°44′58″S 151°34′55″E
- Location: Church: 49 William Street, East Maitland, City of Maitland, New South Wales; Cemetery: access via George St, East Maitland.
- Country: Australia
- Denomination: Anglican
- Website: eastmaitlandanglican.org

History
- Status: Church
- Dedication: Saint Peter
- Dedicated: 29 September 1886

Architecture
- Functional status: Active
- Architect(s): Cyril and Arthur Blacket (Church only)
- Architectural type: Church
- Style: Victorian Academic Gothic
- Years built: 1884–1886

Specifications
- Materials: Sandstone

Administration
- Diocese: Newcastle
- Parish: East Maitland

Clergy
- Priest: The Reverend Scott Dulley

New South Wales Heritage Register
- Official name: St. Peter's Anglican Church Group and Glebe Cemetery; The cemetery is also known as Glebe Gully Burial Ground and East Maitland Anglican Cemetery. St Peters Anglican Church
- Type: State heritage (complex / group)
- Designated: 31 August 2012
- Reference no.: 1886
- Type: Church
- Category: Religion
- Builders: Oliver Saunders (Church only)

St Peter's Anglican Church and Glebe Cemetery are a heritage-listed Anglican church and closed cemetery in East Maitland, New South Wales, Australia. The church is at 49 William Street while the cemetery is approximately 1.2 km (0.7 mi) away, approximately 400 m (1,312 ft) beyond the end of George St, also in East Maitland. The church was designed by Cyril and Arthur Blacket (Blacket Brothers) and built from 1884 to 1886. The cemetery is also known as Glebe Gully Burial Ground and East Maitland Anglican Cemetery. The cemetery and adjoining quarry (the quarry containing early known and unknown graves) were added to the New South Wales State Heritage Register on 31 August 2012.

== History ==
=== St Peter's Anglican Church Precinct ===
The land on which the St. Peter's Church group stands was selected by Archdeacon William Broughton in 1829. A further lot to the south-west was gifted to the parish in 1867, two intermediate lots being purchased in 1881. These now compose the churchyard itself, while the denominational school, parsonage, curate's cottage, columbarium and Youth Centre are located on the original grant.

St. Peter's, East Maitland, is one of the oldest Anglican parishes in Australia, having been established in 1834. From 1829, Church of England services were held inside the school house on Stockade Hill, very close to the later site of the first dedicated church.

The present church was built further up the hill, on land underlaid by stone rather than by clay. Edmund Blacket's sons Cyril and Arthur, practising under the name of Blacket Brothers but with Cyril pre-eminent, designed the new church. The builder, Oliver Saunders, had laid the foundations before financial difficulties forced him into a breach of contract. The work was then supervised by Alexander Sellar, who did not recommission a builder. For aesthetic and practical reasons, local stone, rather than brick, was chosen for above-ground works.

The design called for a tower and spire of great height. As these were to be built at a future time, finance permitting, detailed designs were not produced. Massive foundations for the tower were, however, laid in 1885.

The church was dedicated by Bishop J. B. Pearson, on 29 September 1886. The fabric of the church has since remained substantially unchanged. Stained glass windows and furniture have been progressively added, in most cases not long after the church was built.

St. Peter's Church Hall was once the East Maitland Denominational School. It is likely that the building was erected between 1842 and 1847. The school bell appears to have been transferred from an older school house after its closure. After 1867, the building was rented out; from 1885 until 1897 it was occupied by the Department of Lands. The old school then became the parish hall. It was then leased by Miss Barker, the principal of "Rydal", a private boarding school for girls and preparatory school for boys. During the Second World War the building was used by the National Emergency Service as a first aid post. It then reverted to use as a parish hall and office.

The Rectory was built in 1860, to the south of the original church. Originally a four-roomed Victorian Georgian style brick cottage with a separate kitchen and shingled roof, alterations and additions have been made over a long period. Two extra rooms were added in 1873, and another in 1893. The roof shingles were replaced in slate at some stage between these two dates. In 1920, the rectory was substantially renovated and modified in a predominantly Arts and Crafts style, executed to a design by local architect Robert Scobie, although much of the 1860 fabric of the building remained substantially intact. Many of the original features remain internally and externally legible. The eastern portion of the slate roof appears to follow the ridge and roof lines of the 1860 parsonage.

The Youth Centre building originated during the Second World War, when an important military camp (the Greta Army Camp) was established in the lower Hunter district near the township of Greta, some 42 km to the north-west.

After the war, its more than two hundred timber-framed huts were used as a reception camp for migrants. One of these was purchased by the parish in 1960 and moved to Eastville, a newly developed, chiefly Housing Commission suburb at the eastern boundary of East Maitland. In 1961 the building was dedicated as the Church of St. Mark. It ceased to be used as such in 1976, although for a time the Sunday School continued to use it. The building, by then called St Mark's Hall, was used by the 3rd East Maitland Scouts until 1982, when it was relocated to the approximate site of the original church. Although the Scout group relocated in 1989, the Youth Centre, as it is now known, continues to serve the needs of young people of the parish and of the wider community. It is being used by the Samaritans, the Anglican charitable organisation, as a drop-in centre for those in physical need or seeking spiritual counsel.

=== Glebe Cemetery ===
A glebe of 7 hectares (18 acres) was included in Major Thomas Mitchell's plan for the Township of Maitland and was marked out by Assistant Surveyor G. B. White in 1829. In 1830, however, Governor Darling received an instruction from the Secretary of State for Colonies that "the glebe allotted to each chaplain shall be to the extent of 16 hectares (40 acres)". In addition, each chaplain was to be allowed one or two convict labourers to keep his glebe in order, who would be fed and clothed at public expense.

Accordingly, Major Mitchell instructed Assistant Surveyor White, on 5 September 1834, to add 9 hectares (22 acres) to the 7 hectares (18 acres) already marked out as the glebe at Maitland. White reported on 15 November 1834 that he had measured the glebe but had excluded 0 hectares (1 acre) from it containing a stone quarry and had made up the difference by including a part of the garden attached to the Government Cottage. Mitchell disapproved of those alterations and told White to reverse them, but shortly thereafter was over-ruled by Governor Bourke who ordered the quarry to be excluded from the glebe. As the glebe had to be 7 hectares (18 acres), a deficiency therefore existed of 0 hectares (1 acre), 2 roods and 6 perches. A small parcel of this extent was marked on the opposite side of the burial ground from the glebe. The 16-hectare (40-acre) glebe thus extended further up the hills than did the earlier 7-hectare (18-acre) glebe. It now included a large portion of the Mounted Police paddock and also a spur of the old line of road to Wisemans Ferry that served the stone quarry. Evidence of this road, which is marked on early plans, is still distinguishable in the form of a shallow cutting in the glebe gully.

The stone quarry adjacent to the cemetery was already established by 1835 and being worked by various individuals, when Rev. G. K. Rusden expressed concern that it was being plundered to construct private dwellings and (even) a Catholic Chapel. Despite Rusden's attempt to require his written permission to work the quarry, it remained excluded from the glebe and has been Crown Land, ever since. The overgrown remains of the quarry are clearly evident.

The burial ground itself was marked out, cleared and fenced in 1829, although earlier unmarked graves and unrecorded burials are probable in the south-western corner extending into the upper portion of the quarry. By 1832, however, it had fallen into an overgrown state of neglect and the catechist, Lieut. Wood, complained to the Archdeacon that, "there being no sexton, any persons having a corpse to inter placed it where and in any direction they pleased". Even deceased Roman Catholics made their way, informally, into the burial ground. The subsoil was so hard that the graves were scarcely more than two feet deep, "attracting native dogs to the spot & causing a noxious effluvia (sic) to passengers on the road". A sexton was appointed in May, 1832.

The burial ground was extended in 1835, consecrated in 1843 (on the same day as St Peter's Church) and extended, again, in 1850, by fencing the former access road to the quarry. The earliest gravestone in the cemetery dates from 1828, the burial having been moved there from elsewhere in 1835. The headstone of Andrew Sparke marks the first identified original burial in November, 1830. Subsequent monuments are notable for their quaint spelling, lurid descriptions and other idiosyncrasies. They provide a valuable insight into life – and death – in colonial NSW. The Glebe Cemetery is the resting place of several notable pioneers of the district including, reputedly but unmarked, Colonial Architect Francis Greenway. The cemetery remained in regular use until 1892. Title to was transferred to Maitland City Council in 1994.

== Description ==
The Church Group is on ground rising from near Newcastle Street (New England Highway) up to St. Peter's Church which stands on the commanding eminence of Stockade Hill, East Maitland. It is thus situated at the western end of William Street, the principal axis of colonial East Maitland. This broad avenue still connects St Peter's visually and spatially to the Maitland Courthouse and the Maitland Gaol at the eastern end, providing a powerful reminder of the interplay between church and state in colonial NSW. The site, which has a double street frontage to Banks Street and William Street, slopes away to the north-west.

=== Church ===
The walls of the church, which was completed in 1885, are constructed in substantial white sandstone quarried at nearby Two Mile Creek. The roof is of kauri pine, and is covered in best Welsh slate. A planned tower and steeple have never been built, although massive foundations are in place.

The interior of the church conforms with the gothic scheme of the exterior. A lofty nave runs between the western door and the marble chancel steps. Beyond this is the chancel, flanked by a vestry and an organ chamber, while the sanctuary contains the altar and reredos. The sides of the nave are marked by granite columns with rounded capitals, with a series of lancet arches supporting the clerestory roof. These give way to two matching aisles. The kauri pine hammer beam king post roof trusses support a cedar-boarded ceiling. The concrete floor of the nave, the chancel and the sanctuary are covered with encaustic inlaid tiles imported from Shropshire.

The stone windows contain mullions and cinquefoils. The stained glass is of a particularly high quality in both design and materials.

The furniture is a mixture of Australian, British and continental items. The marble and alabaster pulpit, which is modelled on that in St Saviour's Cathedral in Goulburn and carved by John Roddis of Birmingham, is supported by marble columns and contains five panels depicting Biblical themes: Christ as the Good Shepherd, Elijah being fed by ravens, Moses with the Commandments, Peter holding the keys of salvation by faith and Paul holding the sharp two-edged sword of scripture. It was presented by Jane Eckford of East Maitland, in memory of her parents John and Eliza. John was the eldest son of William Eckford, convict harbour pilot at Newcastle.

The brass lectern depicts an eagle standing on the sphere of the earth, around which it carries the Gospel on its back. It was presented by the surviving children of William and Elizabeth Eckford. The reredos, presented by the sons of Samuel and Ann Clift in memory of their parents, is of Oamaru stone and Carrara marble, its three panels symbolising the Trinity, and severally bearing the legends Alpha and Omega and the christogram IHS, surmounted by a Latin cross. It was carved by David Gourlay of Sydney and erected by William Hallam, also of Sydney.

The font, of Caen stone with marble pilasters, features carved panels recording scriptural baptismal scenes, each separated by one of the four Evangelists. \Erected in 1888 and paid for by those who had been baptised in the original church, it is a replica of that in St. Saviour's Cathedral, Goulburn, as is the pulpit; both are by John Roddis of Birmingham.

The organ, with richly decorated pipes, was built by Henry Willis, of London, in 1876. Pending the building of the church, it was stored in the parish Denominational School. It is one of the best-preserved such instruments in the State, having been conserved with financial assistance from the Heritage Office.

The nave seats were manufactured to the specification of Blacket Brothers, being very similar to those designed by their father for All Saints' Woollahra. Some of these were installed in 1959, well after the opening of the church. All follow the same design.

The stained glass windows in the nave, the chief glory of the church, were executed by Lavers and Westlake of London. They depict various Scriptural scenes with a particular delicacy and sensitivity to detail. Some other windows, particularly those in the clerestory, are of later manufacture and have been progressively installed, chiefly as memorial gifts.

The font was placed in the church in 1888, the pulpit in 1893 and the reredos in 1894. The gaslights, contemporaneous with the church were replaced with the present electric pendant lights in 1926.

=== St. Peter's Church Hall ===
The hall stands to the west of the site, near Banks Street. Its design is symmetrical, and accommodated pupils within large open spaces in which classes would be divided into groups rather than individual classrooms. While aesthetically undistinguished, the massing of the building toward gabled wings along a central axis does give an impression of solidity, as it was no doubt meant to do. A schoolmaster's residence, with dormer windows, was provided in the high roof void. The classroom now features a stage, while the master's residence is now a flat. Window and door lintels are of stone. A skillion weatherboard extension accommodates a meeting room, while much of the verandah to the north has been infilled in the same material. Large multi-pane, double-hung sash windows light the building by day. Internally, exposed queen post trusses and timber rafters support a timber-lined ceiling and zincalume roof. Floors are of timber; walls are lined with painted, compressed sheeting.

=== Rectory ===
The present structure of the Rectory is the result of considerable alterations, renovations and extensions undertaken as the building grew along with the parish and town that it served. The original section, much of which survives, was a Victorian Georgian verandahed cottage. This was subsequently altered to the extent that it now conforms with the Arts and Crafts style while retaining many earlier features. Originally of brick, with flagged verandahs and a wooden shingled roof, the brick and weatherboard extensions transformed the cottage into a much larger dwelling. The stables were converted into garaging. One side of the verandah roof is supported by wooden posts, the remainder by brick pillars. A number of obsolete items, such as stone steps and a trap door to the cellar, remain in place but largely concealed by later works.

=== Youth Centre ===
This is a hardwood timber-framed, weatherboard-clad building typical of thousands built as elements of barrack blocks built during the Second World War and traditionally called "lines" after the regularity of their placement. It is of a standard design at once familiar to anyone who has done military service. Originally standing in the military camp, later a migrant camp, at Greta, the structure has so far been moved three times in the course of its many incarnations. It currently features a verandah running approximately half way down its south-eastern sides, together with a small chancel-like projection associated with its previous use as a church. It has sash windows, with kitchen and toilets. Internally, the building has a timber floor; the walls are lined with timber boards, while the ceiling is lined with compressed sheet. It currently caters to the needs of youth, and previously acted as a "drop-in" centre operated by the Samaritans, the Anglican charitable group.

=== Glebe Cemetery ===
The cemetery and adjacent quarry together occupy an area of 2 acres (0.4 ha). The cemetery is the only historic built element in a broader cultural landscape of both Aboriginal and European significance. The remains of the Old South Road traverse the site and preserve important evidence of early road technology.

=== Condition ===
==== Church ====
While the fabric stands in generally good condition, the nature of the site as well as inappropriate earthworks previously employed have combined to create drainage problems. Absorption of water has caused considerable spalling to structurally important sections of lower stonework. Subsequent conservation works have improved drainage, although the damage to stonework cannot be remediated unless and until finances permit. The stonework is generally sound, although more damage is evident on the weather side. This applies particularly to buttresses, together with window beading and sills. There are some rust stains caused by oxidisation of protective window grilles. The slate roof is weathered in places. The church is the subject of an approved Conservation Management Plan, completed in December 2010. Subsequent conservation works have involved repairs to guttering, downpipes and drainage. Earth has been regraded so as to direct water away from the walls.

==== St. Peter's Parish Hall ====
The hall stands in good condition, with a sound roof. The bricks, stonework and pointing are generally in fair condition, although rising damp remains a problem in places.

==== Rectory ====
This also stands in good condition, having undergone considerable repair and maintenance. Much of the original brickwork is protected by the verandah roof.

==== Youth Centre ====
This building is well roofed and painted, with a sound hardwood frame. Its piers are high enough to avoid damage by damp or termites.

The curtilage of the church has considerable archaeological potential. Apart from the brick and stone buildings that once stood in what is now the churchyard, the foundations for the tower as designed by Blacket Brothers are also extant. There is a high potential for the existence of archaeological relics, particularly foundations, on the site of the original church of 1838, demolished in 1890. The probability of finding Indigenous relics within the site cannot presently be quantified.

==== Glebe Cemetery ====
The cemetery and adjacent quarry are poorly maintained and overgrown. Although some of the headstones have been re-erected and conserved, most are either broken, knocked over or both. An area where vaults have subsided has been fenced off. The cemetery has the potential to reveal burial customs, both formal and informal, in colonial NSW.

=== Integrity ===
The portions of the original grant along Newcastle Street (New England Highway) have been alienated and built on.

The church has a very high level of integrity and intactness. Although certain items, such as some windows, furniture, choir tiling and pulpit, were introduced after completion of the main body of the building in 1886, most of these addressed deficiencies or constituted improvements as part of the Blackets' design scheme. The level of intactness is illustrated by the fact that electric lighting was not introduced until 1926, and that the fittings, circuit diagram, steel conduit and rubber-insulated wiring have survived without substantial modification.

The hall is also substantially intact, having undergone surprisingly few modifications over the years, although these include the lining of the walls, partial infilling of the verandah, and a weatherboard extension. It remains instantly recognisable as an 1840s schoolroom with supporting rooms and master's residence.

The Rectory retains many elements of its origins as an 1860s parsonage. While renovations, repairs and extensions have been carried out, these have mostly complemented or concealed, rather than destroyed, the original fabric, much of which remains legible within the context of the later works.

The military origins of the Youth Centre are easily recognisable. The addition of a verandah, together with a small chancel, has hardly altered its original shape.

The Glebe Cemetery has suffered extensive vandalism to most of its monuments, is overgrown and poorly maintained. Some conservation works were carried out in 2002.

=== Modifications and dates ===
==== Site ====
The first portion of the Newcastle Street frontage to be alienated was sold to the Crown for the Department of Lands in 1894. The Lands Office, designed by Walter Liberty Vernon, stands on this site, as does an associated cottage and outbuildings. The parson's paddock at the opposite end of the block, intended for the grazing of horses, was sold in 1962 and is now the site of a service station. The former tennis courts were sold in 1988, but their site has not yet been built upon.

The land on which the St. Peter's Church group stands was selected by Archdeacon Broughton in 1829. A further lot to the south-west was gifted to the parish in 1867, two intermediate lots being purchased in 1881. These now compose the churchyard itself, while the denominational school, parsonage, curate's cottage, columbarium and Youth Centre are located on the original grant.

==== Church ====
The stained glass windows in the sanctuary, aisle and narthex were installed at or shortly after the time of construction. Some clerestory windows, being less visible, were progressively installed between 1886 and the 1920s, with isolated exceptions completed in the 1950s and 1960s. The choir vestry window was installed in 1916, while that in the priests' vestry was not completed until 1968.

The font was placed in the church in 1888, the pulpit in 1893, and the rederos in 1894. The gas lights, contemporaneous with the church, were replaced with the present electric pendant lights in 1926.

==== St Peter's Church Hall ====
The modifications to the hall include the infilling of part of the northern verandah during the 1950s, and a weatherboard skillion extension for a second Sunday School room in 1959. A stage was built inside the former schoolroom in about 1900.

==== Rectory ====
The Rectory was extended in 1873, two additional rooms being provided. A third room was added in 1893. In 1920, significant alterations were performed to a plan prepared by local architect Robert Scobie. The stable, built in 1867, was converted into garaging when the horses were replaced by cars.

==== Youth Centre ====
A small chancel was added to the eastern wall of the former barrack hut at some time before 1976, when it ceased to be used as a church. The verandah was added in the early 1980s, after it had been moved to its current site.

==== Glebe Cemetery ====
In July, 2002, excavation, conservation and re-erection of 18 headstones was carried out and the subsided vaults/crypts were fenced off. There is evidence of ongoing unauthorised clearing/maintenance of several gravesites.

== Heritage listing ==
St Peter's Anglican Church Group and the Glebe Cemetery are state significant elements of the colonial heritage of the Hunter Valley. Together, they exemplify the evolution of religious practice, architectural achievement and social life in the community from 1829 to the present day.

St Peter's Church Group site, in continuous use for religious purposes since 1829, encompasses St Peter's Church (1886), Church Hall (1840s), Rectory (1860) and other built and archaeological items. The broad avenue of William Street, principal axis of colonial East Maitland, connects St Peter's visually and spatially to the Courthouse and the Gaol, providing a powerful reminder of the interplay between church and state in colonial NSW. The Church is one of the finest examples in New South Wales of a sandstone church in the Victorian Academic Gothic style as interpreted by a leading architectural practice of the time. The Church Hall is one of the earliest substantially intact large brick school buildings still extant in New South Wales.

The Glebe Cemetery was marked out, cleared and fenced in 1829, although earlier, unmarked, graves are probably present. Its monuments form a record of the early families of the district, reputedly including the unmarked burial of Colonial Architect Francis Greenway. The adjacent quarry, established by 1835, provided stone for St Peter's Church, the Catholic Chapel, private dwellings and headstones for the cemetery.

St Peter's Anglican Church and Glebe Cemetery was listed on the New South Wales State Heritage Register on 31 August 2012 having satisfied the following criteria.

The place is important in demonstrating the course, or pattern, of cultural or natural history in New South Wales.

St. Peter's church exemplifies the highest aspirations of the Anglo-Catholic tradition in New South Wales, which from the 1890s has been the dominant Anglican ecclesiastic tradition in New South Wales.

The site has been continuously occupied for ecclesiastical purposes from 1836 onward, although services in the nearby schoolhouse were held even earlier. The present St. Peter's church is a notable example of the work of Cyril and Arthur Blacket, heirs to the practice and heritage of their father Edmund. While not designed by Edmund, the church is closely related to some of his other celebrated commissions executed in the Victorian Academic Gothic style, and represents a continuation of his influence even after his death. The church hall, formerly the Denominational School, provides evidence of the nineteenth century connection between religious and educational cultural endeavours. The Rectory illustrates attempts by church authorities to modify assets to reflect the growth and development of the parish within the context of the wider Colonial church, and also the close relationship between Anglo-Catholic clergy and the church buildings that reflect their theology.

The Glebe Cemetery served the Anglican community between 1829 and 1892, although earlier, unmarked, graves and unrecorded burials of other denominations are probably present. Its headstones form a record of the early families, pioneers, settlers and prominent citizens of the district, reputedly including the unmarked burial of Colonial Architect Francis Greenway. The contentious history of the adjacent quarry bespeaks the competition among individuals and groups in colonial East Maitland for resources such as building materials. Aboriginal use of a ceremonial site in the vicinity of the cemetery continued through the Colonial Period and, perhaps, to the present day.

The place has a strong or special association with a person, or group of persons, of importance of cultural or natural history of New South Wales's history.

The church has a strong connection with architects Cyril and Arthur Blacket, and through them with their father, the leading Gothic architect within the Colony. The parish itself was established by Archdeacon William Grant Broughton, who later became Bishop of Australia, who dedicated the first church on the site.

The site was once an important centre of social life, not only for parishioners but for members of the wider community. Dr Herbert Vere Evatt, a brilliant jurist and politician, as a boy attended East Maitland Superior School and was a member of the St. Peter's choir. "The Doc" went on to become a member of the New South Wales Legislative Assembly and Australian House of Representatives, Commonwealth Attorney General and Minister for External Affairs, the youngest ever Justice of the High Court of Australia, Chief Justice of New South Wales, a founder of the United Nations Organisation and President of the United Nations General Assembly.

The Glebe Cemetery is the final resting place of the early pioneers, settlers and prominent citizens of the district, and reputedly includes the unmarked burial of Colonial Architect Francis Greenway.

The place is important in demonstrating aesthetic characteristics and/or a high degree of creative or technical achievement in New South Wales.

The church is situated at the western end of William Street, the principal axis of colonial East Maitland. This broad avenue still connects St Peter's visually and spatially to the Courthouse and the Gaol at the eastern end, providing a powerful reminder of the interplay between church and state in colonial NSW.

The church is a prominent and highly legible example of the Victorian Academic Gothic style as interpreted by the Blacket family. The quality of craftsmanship and materials is very high, particularly with regard to stonework, stained glass windows, encaustic tiling and sacred furnishings in stone and marble. The mechanical pipe organ, by Henry Willis of London, is the only operable survivor of five similar organs built by Willis for the Maitland area in the nineteenth century. It was restored in 1998 with the financial assistance of the New South Wales Heritage Office.

The rectory exemplifies the evolutionary and cultural influences upon clerical and parish life in New South Wales over the past 150 years, and the manner in which a Victorian Georgian cottage has been adapted in later architectural styles, using contemporary materials.

The hall demonstrates both internally and externally the use of symmetry in constructing a large brick educational building of the Victorian Georgian style in the New South Wales context. Alterations and additions to the original fabric have not diminished the demonstrative value of the building.

While the Youth Centre is a straightforwardly vernacular building, it provides an insight into the inherent strength and remarkable versatility of New South Wales timber barrack buildings of the Second World War, so many of which have been used outside their original contexts.

The cemetery is aesthetically distinctive. Its headstones are notable for their quaint spelling, lurid descriptions and other idiosyncrasies. Maitland City Council notes that the relationship of gravestones and memorials in an overgrown landscape of grassland, creates an atmosphere which emphasises the historic nature of the cemetery in a somewhat neglected but "romantic" state. The broader visual catchment surrounding the cemetery has a "dramatic quality" that has been emphasised in prior assessments by the National Trust and the Australian Heritage Commission.

The place has strong or special association with a particular community or cultural group in New South Wales for social, cultural or spiritual reasons.

St. Peter's church is exemplifies the highest aspirations of the Anglo-Catholic tradition in New South Wales, which from the 1890s has been the dominant in Anglican ecclesiastic tradition in New South Wales. It has a special association for those who are members of the parish or who were once members, and for citizens of the City of Maitland.

The Rectory has special associations with the clerical families who have lived there for over 150 years, as well as with members of the parish over that period of time.

The place has potential to yield information that will contribute to an understanding of the cultural or natural history of New South Wales.

The fabric and furnishings of the church have both local and international connections. The origins of most of these have been carefully recorded in the Conservation Management Plan prepared in December 2010. The substantially original condition of the church allows an insight into Colonial ecclesiastical and cultural life in the 1880s.

The rectory has the potential to provide an understanding of the evolution of clerical life between 1860 and the present day.

The hall remains legible as an education facility, with religious instruction still continuing on site.

The Youth Centre affords an insight into efforts by the Samaritans, the Anglican charitable organisation for the Diocese, to assist those in need.

The cemetery has the potential to reveal archaeological information about nineteenth century burial practices, particularly unrecorded burials and those prior to 1829.

The place possesses uncommon, rare or endangered aspects of the cultural or natural history of New South Wales.

The quality and provenance of certain furnishings at St. Peter's are uncommon in New South Wales. The pulpit, font, rederos and many of the stained glass windows are fine expressions of the art of the mason, sculptor and glazier, no expense having been spared in importing these from artists and companies in Britain, Australia and the Continent.

The Rectory is an uncommon example of a dwelling, continuously occupied and owned by a single religious organisation, that has evolved over a century and a half.

Sunday School facilities, such as the hall, are increasingly rare in NSW, not only for financial and staffing reasons but due to a perceived lack of community interest. It may be necessary to canvas alternate uses for this building, if it is to survive.

The place is important in demonstrating the principal characteristics of a class of cultural or natural places/environments in New South Wales.

The church demonstrates the principal characteristics of a large church in the Victorian Academic Gothic style as interpreted by Blacket Brothers. Failure to build the tower and spire does not detract from the demonstrative value of the completed and intact body of the church. The base of the proposed tower is legible, affording an example of the stages of the project as planned by the architect, Clerk of Works and the parish itself.

The hall, substantially intact, exemplifies the way in which children and their schoolmaster were accommodated in a New South Wales denominational school of the 1840s.

The original portion of the Rectory is demonstrative of domestic clerical life in the Colony.

== See also ==
- List of Anglican churches in New South Wales
