= Cicely Englefield =

British artist (1893-1970)

Cicely Englefield (29 June 1893–1970) was a British artist known for writing and illustrating children's books.

== Biography ==
Englefield was born in the Lee area of south London where her father was a solicitor and County Court Register. After attending Maidstone Grammar School and Blackheath High School, she studied at the St Martin's School of Art and the Central School of Arts and Crafts. After producing illustrations for children's annuals she began to illustrate her own children's books which were often about animal characters and natural history subjects. Throughout her career, Englefield often used wood engraving techniques and also created illustrations in watercolour, lithography and pen and ink drawings. She died at Poole, Dorset.

== Published works ==
- George and Angela, 1932
- Katie the Caterpiller, 1933
- Billy Winks, 1934
- The Tale of a Guinea Pig, 1935
- A House for a Mouse, 1936
- Squishy Apples, 1937
- Bennie Black Lamb, 1938
- Connie the Cow, 1939
- Jeremy Jack, the Lazy Hare, 1940
- Bert the Sparrow, 1941
- Monty the Frog, 1941
- Feather the Foal, 1942
- The Tale of a Tadpole, 1945
- In Field and Hedgerow, 1948
- Scruffy the Little Black Hen, 1948
- Stories of an Old Grey Wall, 1958.
