= Smith's Flour Mill =

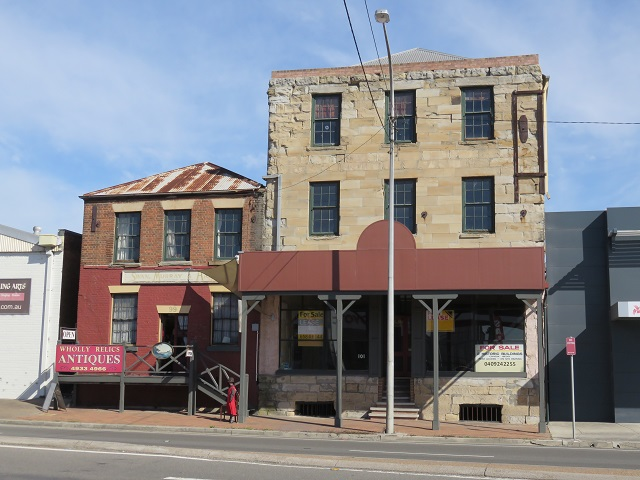

- Location within New South Wales Location within Australia
- 32.7462°S 151.5805°E
- Location: 91 Newcastle Road, East Maitland, City of Maitland, New South Wales, Australia

History
- Built: 1844–

Site notes
- Owner: Frost Associates Pty Ltd; Kilaben Bay Pty Ltd

New South Wales Heritage Register
- Official name: Smith's Flour Mill (former); Smiths Flour Mill
- Type: state heritage (built)
- Designated: 2 April 1999
- Reference no.: 237
- Type: Mill (Grain) – Wheat
- Category: Manufacturing and Processing
- Builders: John Smith

Smith's Flour Mill is a heritage-listed former flour mill and now retail store at 91 Newcastle Road, East Maitland, City of Maitland, New South Wales, Australia. It was built from 1844 by John Smith. It was added to the New South Wales State Heritage Register on 2 April 1999.

== History ==
As early as 1830 emancipated convict John Smith, man of property, insisted on calling himself "Gentleman Smith". Despite the opinions of the Mitchells and other free settlers, Smith was determined to do well. He no doubt felt self-satlsfied when his carriage was used by Governor Fitzroy on a vice-regal visit to the Hunter Valley in 1847. It is possible that Smith named a road that traversed his Wallis Plains farm "Fitzroy Road" as a personal compliment to the Governor on this occasion.

In 1838 Smith advertised a 250 acre farm at Wallis Plains to let, for five to seven years, 'ideal for newly-arrived emigrants.'

In 1855, when the East Maitland and West Maitland communities were debating where the government should build a definitive courthouse, Smith had a lengthy letter printed in the Maitland Mercury, telling readers, and posterity, of his past and present largesse. He wroteL 'I have accommodated the community with a court house for ten or twelve years for a very trifling expense; and I should have no objection to giving half an acre of land for the purposes of a court house, providing it shall be erected'.

In this letter he claimed that he was the oldest settler on the Hunter River, and stated:'The Maitland district was established in October 1818, by Governor Macquarie. Two others, with myself, were permitted to selecte each a farm in any part of Maitland where we thought proper, and he gave me a written order that I should have the first choice. This indulgence was given for the services rendered on the occasion. All three of us fixed on land in East Maitland, considering it was the best place for a township.'

The "occasion" was probably Macquarie's visit to the district in August 1818. In the letter Smith avered, that, in the great flood of 1819:'I was one of those who, on that occasion, went to West Maitland to take some of the settlers from the tops of their houses, in a large boat, and landed them on the hill behind the old courthouse.'

Smith's substantial steam flour mill at East Maitland was no longer economical when wheat growing declined in the Lower Hunter from about the 1860s. However in 1868 he came up with a proposal to form a company to turn the building into a woollen cloth manufactory. No investor came forward. Smith died in 1870, without seeing this plan materialise.

Smith and his wife Mary are buried in the Christ Church cemetery, Newcastle. He is an interesting pioneer, having lived a long and active life, many records survive that reveal his character, dealings and achievements. They illustrate how a man might do well in colonial society, moving from lowly convict status to that of a self-appointed "gentleman" of considerable wealth and property, albeit one that many other more respectable people thought lacking in gentility and good manners.

The mill was subsequently used for retail and business premises, although it was vacant as of 2017.

== Heritage listing ==
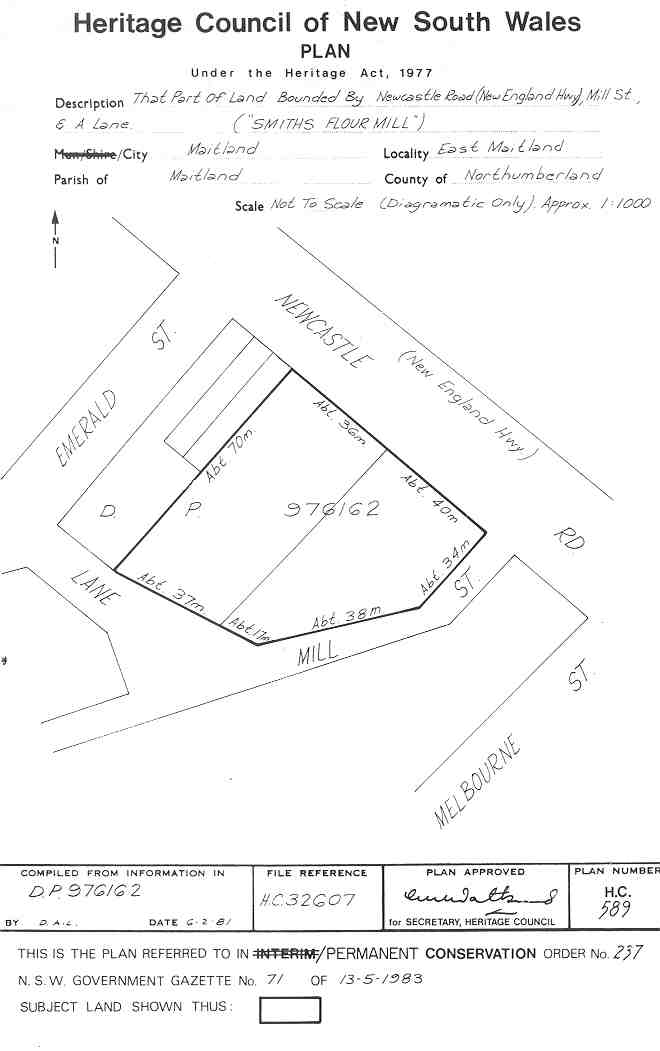
Heritage boundaries

Smith's Flour Mill was listed on the New South Wales State Heritage Register on 2 April 1999.
