= Greater Manchester =

Ceremonial county in North West England

- Metropolitan and ceremonial county
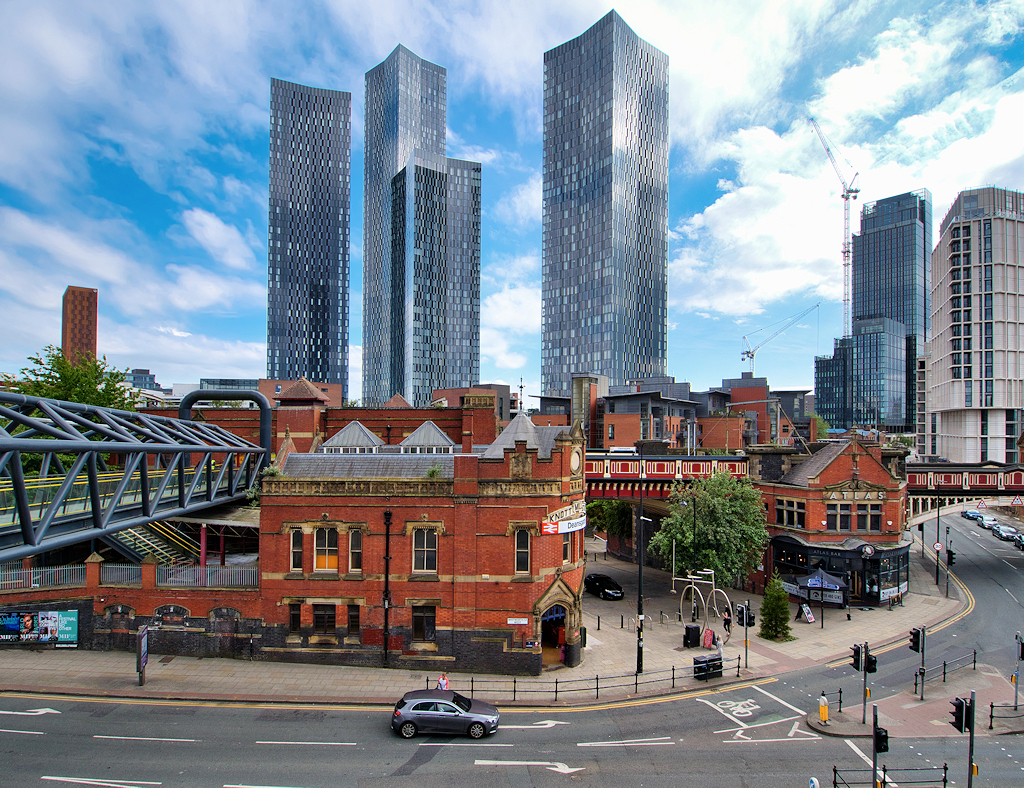
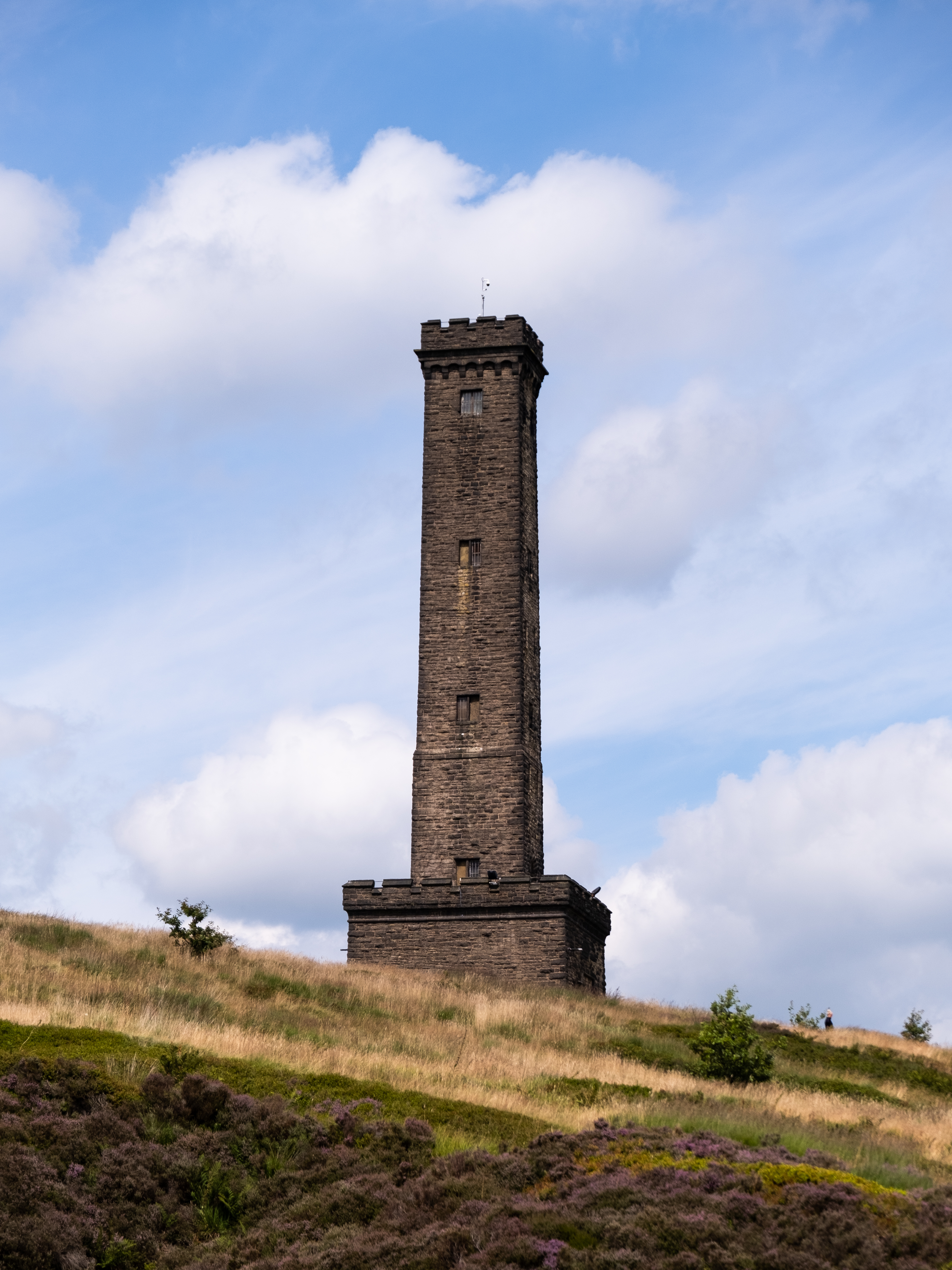
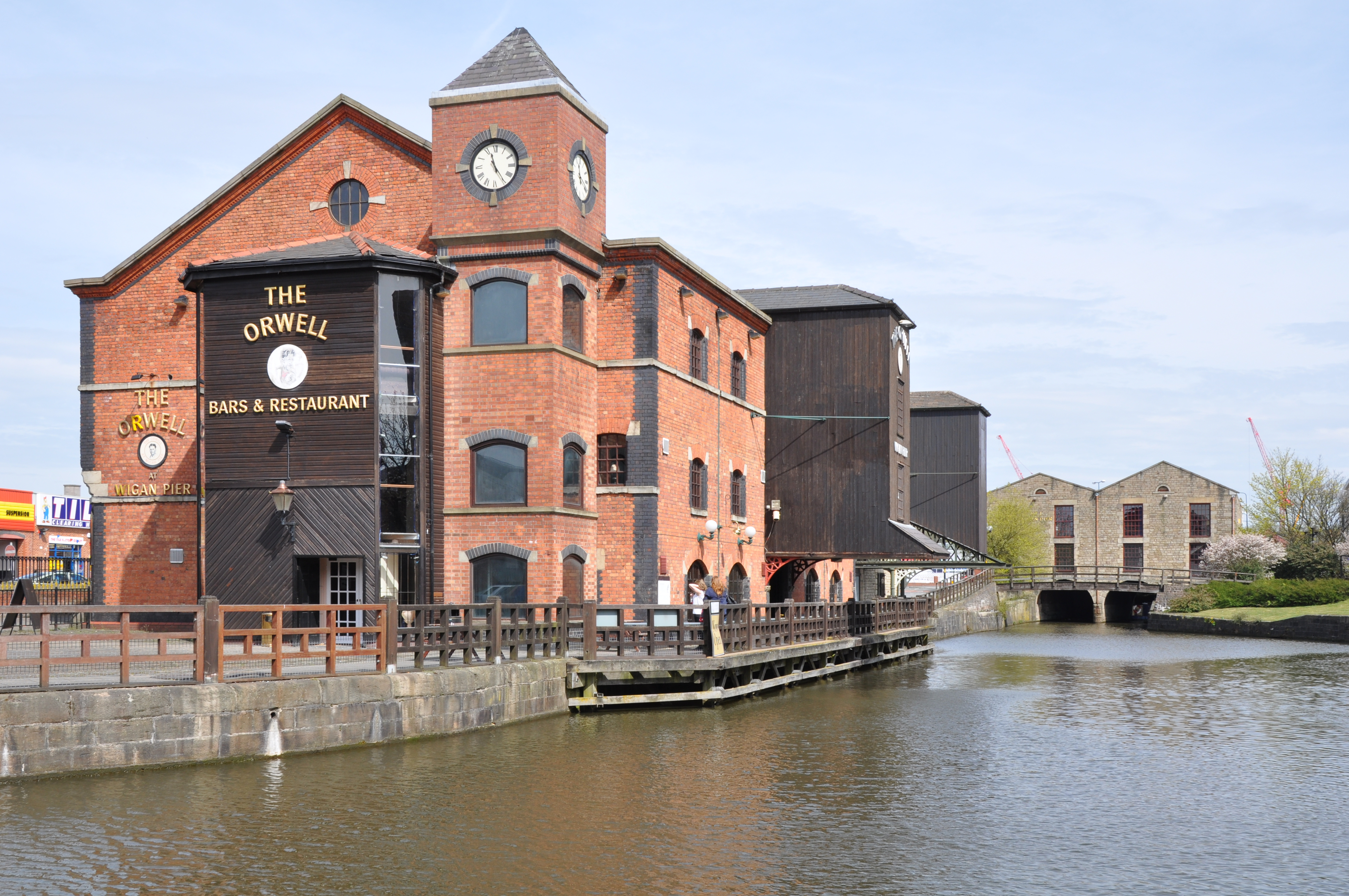
- Clockwise from top: Deansgate Square towers, Manchester; Wigan Pier; Peel Monument, Ramsbottom

- Location of Greater Manchester within England
- Coordinates: 53.5025°N 2.3100°W
- Sovereign state: United Kingdom
- Constituent country: England
- Region: North West England
- Established: 1 April 1974
- Established by: Local Government Act 1972
- Preceded by: 3 county councils 8 county boroughs: Lancashire County Council Cheshire County Council West Riding County Council Manchester Salford Stockport Bolton Bury Oldham Rochdale Wigan
- Origin: Lancashire (north); Cheshire (south); Yorkshire (West Riding) (parts of east)
- Time zone: UTC+0 (GMT)
  - Summer (DST): UTC+1 (BST)
- UK Parliament: 27 MPs
- Police: Greater Manchester Police
- Ceremonial county
- Lord Lieutenant: Diane Hawkins
- High Sheriff: Mark Llewellin
- Area: 1,276 km^{2} (493 sq mi)
  - Rank: 39th of 48
- Population (2024): 3,009,664
  - Rank: 3rd of 48
  - Density: 2,359/km^{2} (6,110/sq mi)
- Metropolitan county
- Government: Greater Manchester Combined Authority
- Mayor: Bev Craig
- GSS code: E11000001 (county); E47000001 (city region)
- ITL: TLD3
- Website: greatermanchester-ca.gov.uk
- Districts
- Districts of Greater Manchester; Metropolitan districts
- Districts: List: Manchester; Stockport; Tameside; Oldham; Rochdale; Bury; Bolton; Wigan; Salford; Trafford

Greater Manchester is a metropolitan and ceremonial county in North West England. It borders Lancashire to the north, West Yorkshire and Derbyshire to the east, Cheshire to the south, and Merseyside to the west. Its largest settlement is the city of Manchester.

The county has an area of 1,276 km^{2} (493 sq mi) and is highly urbanised, with an estimated population of 3,009,664 in 2024. Manchester is in the centre of the county, with the city of Salford immediately adjacent to the west. Other large settlements include Rochdale in the north-east, Stockport in the south-east, Sale in the south-west, Wigan in the far north-west, and Bolton in the north-west. The majority of the county's settlements are part of the Greater Manchester Built-up Area, which extends into Cheshire and Merseyside and is the second most populous urban area in the United Kingdom. For local government purposes the county comprises ten metropolitan boroughs: Manchester, Salford, Bolton, Bury, Oldham, Rochdale, Stockport, Tameside, Trafford and Wigan. The borough councils collaborate through the Greater Manchester Combined Authority. Greater Manchester was created in 1974 from parts of north-east Cheshire, south-east Lancashire, and a small part of the West Riding of Yorkshire.

The centre and south-west of Greater Manchester are lowlands, similar to the West Lancashire Coastal Plain to the north-west and the Cheshire Plain to the south-west. The north and east are part of the Pennines: the West Pennine Moors in the northwest, the South Pennines in the northeast and the Peak District in the east. Most of the county's rivers rise in the Pennines and are tributaries of the Mersey and Irwell, the latter of which is itself a tributary of the Mersey. The county is connected to the Mersey Estuary by the Manchester Ship Canal, which for its entire length within Greater Manchester consists of canalised sections of the Mersey and Irwell.

What is now Greater Manchester was largely rural until the Industrial Revolution, when the region underwent rapid industrialisation. The area's towns and cities became major centres for the manufacture of cotton textiles, aided by the exploitation of the Lancashire coalfield. The region was also an engineering and scientific centre, leading to achievements such as the first inter-city railway. Following deindustrialisation in the mid-20th century the county has emerged as a major centre for the service sector, media and digital industries. It is also recognised for its contributions to guitar and dance music, and for its football teams.

== History ==
=== Britons ===
Although Greater Manchester was not created until 1974, the history of its settlements goes back centuries. There is evidence of Iron Age habitation, particularly at Mellor, and a known Celtic Britons settlement named Chochion, believed to have been an area of Wigan settled by the Brigantes. Stretford was also part of the land believed to have been occupied by the Brigantes, and lay on their border with the Cornovii on the southern side of the River Mersey. The remains of 1st-century forts at Castlefield in Manchester, and Castleshaw Roman Fort in Saddleworth, are evidence of Roman occupation.

=== Historical county geography ===
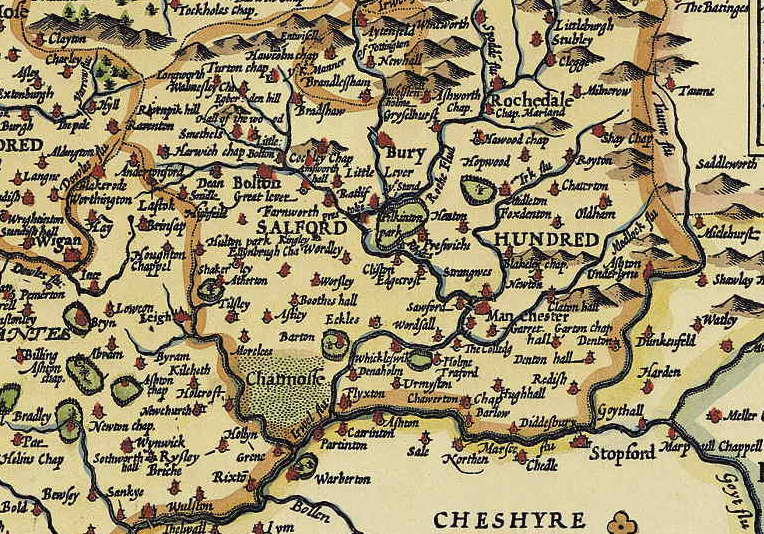
Greater Manchester lies at the conjunction of the historic county boundaries of Lancashire, Cheshire, Yorkshire and, in a small area, Derbyshire.

The territory now comprising Greater Manchester historically lay across several counties. Most of the area north of the River Mersey and River Tame, including Manchester, Salford, Bolton, Bury, Oldham and Rochdale, formed part of the historic county of Lancashire. Much of this area constituted the Salford Hundred, also historically known as Salfordshire, one of the six hundreds of Lancashire.

At the time of the Domesday Book in 1086, Lancashire had not yet emerged as a centrally administered county being governed as occupied territory of the former Kingdom of Northumbria recovered from the Danes by England a century prior. The territory between the Ribble and Mersey was surveyed with Cheshire, and included the area which later became Salford, West Derby and Leyland Hundreds.

Areas south of the Mersey and Tame, including much of modern Stockport and southern Trafford, historically formed part of Cheshire. Saddleworth, now within the Metropolitan Borough of Oldham, formed part of the West Riding of Yorkshire and the Agbrigg Wapentake.

Small areas at Ludworth and Mellor historically formed part of Derbyshire. They were transferred to Cheshire in 1936 and subsequently became part of Greater Manchester in 1974.

The creation of Greater Manchester in 1974 was part of a reorganisation of local government under the Local Government Act 1972. Government guidance states that the Act abolished the previous administrative counties and established new counties for local government purposes, but did not specifically abolish England's historic counties.

=== Manchesterthum ===
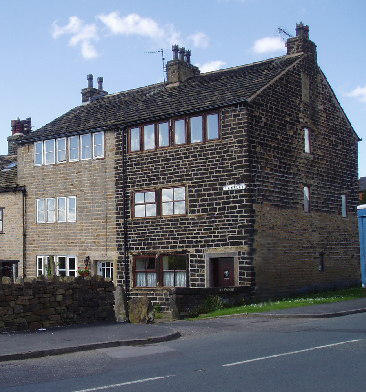
Former weavers' cottages in Wardle. An increase in domestic cloth production, and textile manufacture during the Industrial Revolution is attributed to a population boom in the area.

In the late 18th to early 19th century, the Industrial Revolution transformed the local domestic system; mechanisation enabled the industrialisation of the region's textile trade, triggering rapid growth in the cotton industry and expansion in ancillary trades. The area became central to England's woollen trade with domestic flannel and fustian cloth production, which encouraged a system of cross-regional trade. In the 18th century, German traders had coined the name Manchesterthum to cover the region in and around Manchester.

Infrastructure such as rows of terraced housing, factories and roads were constructed to house labour, transport goods, and produce cotton goods on an industrial scale for a global market. The townships in and around Manchester began expanding "at an astonishing rate" around the turn of the 19th century as part of a process of unplanned urbanisation brought on by a boom in industrial textile production and processing. This population increase resulted in the "vigorous concentric growth" of a conurbation between Manchester and an arc of surrounding mill towns, formed from a steady accretion of houses, factories and transport infrastructure. Places such as Bury, Oldham and Bolton played a central economic role nationally, and by the end of the 19th century had become some of the most important and productive cotton-producing towns in the world. However, it was Manchester that was the most populous settlement, a major city, the world's largest marketplace for cotton goods, and the natural centre of its region. By 1835 "Manchester was without challenge the first and greatest industrial city in the world"; and by 1848 urban sprawl had fused the city to its surrounding towns and hinterland to form a single continuous conurbation. The area is recorded in planning documents for the Manchester Ship Canal dated 1883, as "Manchester, Salford and the Out-Townships".

The conurbation was "a Victorian metropolis, achieving its commercial peak during 1890–1915". In the 1910s, local government reforms to administer this conurbation as a single entity were proposed. Use in a municipal context appeared in a 1914 report submitted in response to what was considered to have been the successful creation of the County of London in 1889. The report suggested that a county should be set up to recognise the "Manchester known in commerce", and referred to the areas that formed "a substantial part of South Lancashire and part of Cheshire, comprising all municipal boroughs and minor authorities within a radius of eight or nine miles of Manchester".

In his 1915 book Cities in Evolution, urban planner Sir Patrick Geddes wrote "far more than Lancashire realises, is growing up another Greater London". The Manchester Evening Chronicle brought to the fore the issue of "regional unity" for the area in April 1935 under the headline "Greater Manchester – The Ratepayers' Salvation". It reported on the "increasing demands for the exploration of the possibilities of a greater merger of public services throughout Manchester and the surrounding municipalities". The issue was frequently discussed by civic leaders in the area at that time, particularly those from Manchester and Salford. The Mayor of Salford pledged his support to the idea, stating that he looked forward to the day when "there would be a merging of the essential services of Manchester, Salford, and the surrounding districts constituting Greater Manchester." Proposals were halted by the Second World War, though in the decade after it, the pace of proposals for local government reform for the area quickened. In 1947, Lancashire County Council proposed a three "ridings" system to meet the changing needs of the county of Lancashire, including those for Manchester and surrounding districts. Other proposals included the creation of a Manchester County Council, a directly elected regional body. In 1951, the census in the UK began reporting on South East Lancashire as a homogeneous conurbation.

=== SELNEC ===
The Local Government Act 1958 designated the south east Lancashire area (which, despite its name, included part of north east Cheshire), a Special Review Area. The Local Government Commission for England presented draft recommendations, in December 1965, proposing a new county based on the conurbation surrounding and including Manchester, with nine most-purpose boroughs corresponding to the modern Greater Manchester boroughs (excluding Wigan). The review was abolished in favour of the Royal Commission on Local Government before issuing a final report.

The Royal Commission's 1969 report, known as the Redcliffe-Maud Report, proposed the removal of much of the then existing system of local government. The commission described the system of administering urban and rural districts separately as outdated, noting that urban areas provided employment and services for rural dwellers, and open countryside was used by town dwellers for recreation. The commission considered interdependence of areas at many levels, including travel-to-work, provision of services, and which local newspapers were read, before proposing a new administrative metropolitan area. The area had roughly the same northern boundary as today's Greater Manchester (though included Rossendale), but covered much more territory from Cheshire (including Macclesfield, Warrington, Alderley Edge, Northwich, Middlewich, Wilmslow and Lymm), and Derbyshire (the towns of New Mills, Whaley Bridge, Glossop and Chapel-en-le-Frith – a minority report suggested that Buxton be included). The metropolitan area was to be divided into nine metropolitan districts, based on Wigan, Bolton, Bury/Rochdale, Warrington, Manchester (including Salford and Old Trafford), Oldham, Altrincham, Stockport and Tameside. The report noted "The choice even of a label of convenience for this metropolitan area is difficult". Seven years earlier, a survey prepared for the British Association intended to define the "South-East Lancashire conurbation" noted that "Greater Manchester it is not ... One of its main characteristics is the marked individuality of its towns, ... all of which have an industrial and commercial history of more than local significance". The term Selnec (or SELNEC) was already in use as an abbreviation for south east Lancashire and north east Cheshire; Redcliffe-Maud took this as "the most convenient term available", having modified it to south east Lancashire, north east and central Cheshire.

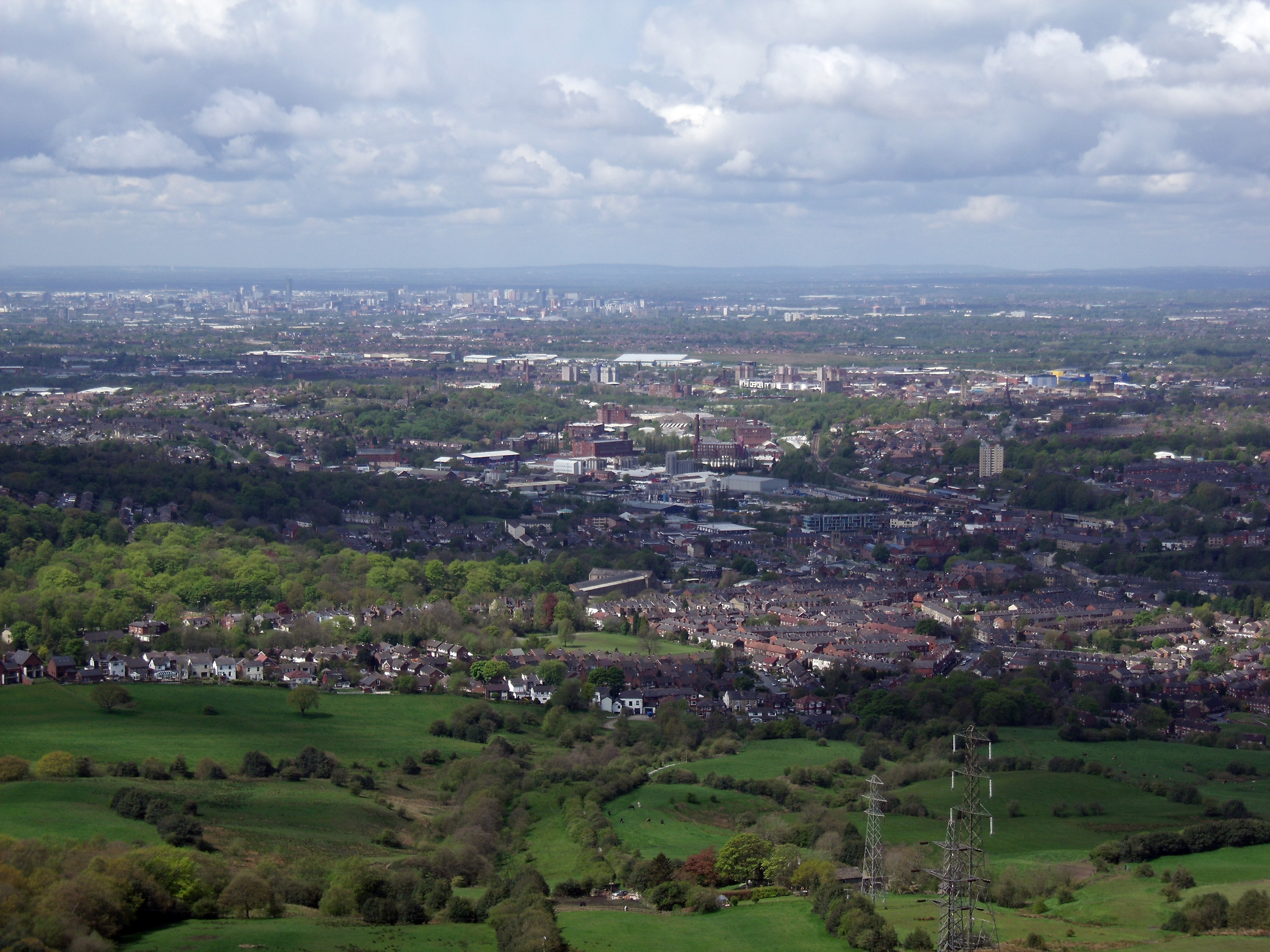
The multiple urban areas of Greater Manchester's boroughs

Following the Transport Act 1968, in 1969 the SELNEC Passenger Transport Executive (an authority to co-ordinate and operate public transport in the region) was set up, covering an area smaller than the proposed Selnec, and different again to the eventual Greater Manchester. Compared with the Redcliffe-Maud area, it excluded Macclesfield, Warrington, and Knutsford but included Glossop in Derbyshire and Saddleworth in the West Riding of Yorkshire. It excluded Wigan, which was both in the Redcliffe-Maud area and in the eventual Greater Manchester (but had not been part of the 1958 act's review area).

Redcliffe-Maud's recommendations were accepted by the Labour-controlled government in February 1970. Although the Redcliffe-Maud Report was rejected by the Conservative government after the 1970 general election, there was a commitment to local government reform, and the need for a metropolitan county centred on the conurbation surrounding Manchester was accepted. The new government's original proposal was much smaller than the Redcliffe-Maud Report's Selnec, with areas such as Winsford, Northwich, Knutsford, Macclesfield and Glossop retained by their original counties to ensure their county councils had enough revenue to remain competitive (Cheshire County Council would have ceased to exist). Other late changes included the separation of the proposed Bury/Rochdale authority (retained from the Redcliffe-Maud report) into the Metropolitan Borough of Bury and the Metropolitan Borough of Rochdale. Bury and Rochdale were originally planned to form a single district (dubbed "Botchdale" by local MP Michael Fidler) but were divided into separate boroughs. To re-balance the districts, the borough of Rochdale took Middleton from Oldham. During the passage of the bill, the towns of Whitworth, Wilmslow and Poynton successfully objected to their incorporation in the new county.

Post-1974		Pre-1974			
Metropolitan county	Metropolitan borough	County boroughs	Municipal boroughs	Urban districts	Parts of rural districts (civil parishes)
Greater Manchester is an amalgamation of 70 former local government districts, including eight county boroughs and 16 municipal boroughs.	Bury	Bury	Prestwich • Radcliffe	Ramsbottom • Tottington • Whitefield	
Greater Manchester is an amalgamation of 70 former local government districts, including eight county boroughs and 16 municipal boroughs.	Bolton	Bolton	Farnworth	Blackrod • Horwich • Kearsley • Little Lever • Turton • Westhoughton	
Greater Manchester is an amalgamation of 70 former local government districts, including eight county boroughs and 16 municipal boroughs.	Manchester	Manchester			Bucklow (Ringway)
Greater Manchester is an amalgamation of 70 former local government districts, including eight county boroughs and 16 municipal boroughs.	Oldham	Oldham		Chadderton • Crompton • Failsworth • Lees • Royton • Saddleworth	
Greater Manchester is an amalgamation of 70 former local government districts, including eight county boroughs and 16 municipal boroughs.	Rochdale	Rochdale	Middleton • Heywood	Littleborough • Milnrow • Wardle	
Greater Manchester is an amalgamation of 70 former local government districts, including eight county boroughs and 16 municipal boroughs.	Salford	Salford	Eccles • Swinton and Pendlebury	Irlam • Worsley	
Greater Manchester is an amalgamation of 70 former local government districts, including eight county boroughs and 16 municipal boroughs.	Stockport	Stockport		Bredbury and Romiley • Cheadle and Gatley • Hazel Grove and Bramhall • Marple	
Greater Manchester is an amalgamation of 70 former local government districts, including eight county boroughs and 16 municipal boroughs.	Tameside		Ashton-under-Lyne • Dukinfield • Hyde • Mossley • Stalybridge	Audenshaw • Denton • Droylsden • Longdendale	
Greater Manchester is an amalgamation of 70 former local government districts, including eight county boroughs and 16 municipal boroughs.	Trafford		Altrincham • Sale • Stretford	Bowdon • Hale • Urmston	Bucklow (Carrington • Dunham Massey • Partington • Warburton)
Greater Manchester is an amalgamation of 70 former local government districts, including eight county boroughs and 16 municipal boroughs.	Wigan	Wigan	Leigh	Abram • Ashton in Makerfield • Aspull • Atherton • Billinge and Winstanley • Hindley • Ince-in-Makerfield • Golborne • Orrell • Standish-with-Langtree • Tyldesley	Wigan (Haigh • Shevington • Worthington)

=== 1974–1997 ===
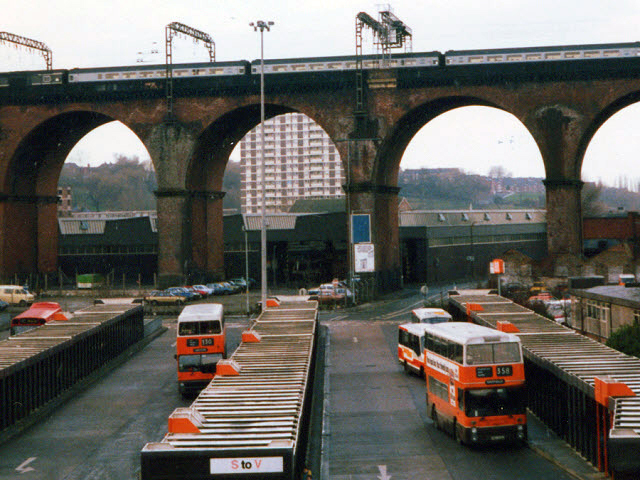
Stockport bus station in 1988. Greater Manchester Transport (later GM Buses) operated bus services throughout the county, from 1974 to 1993.

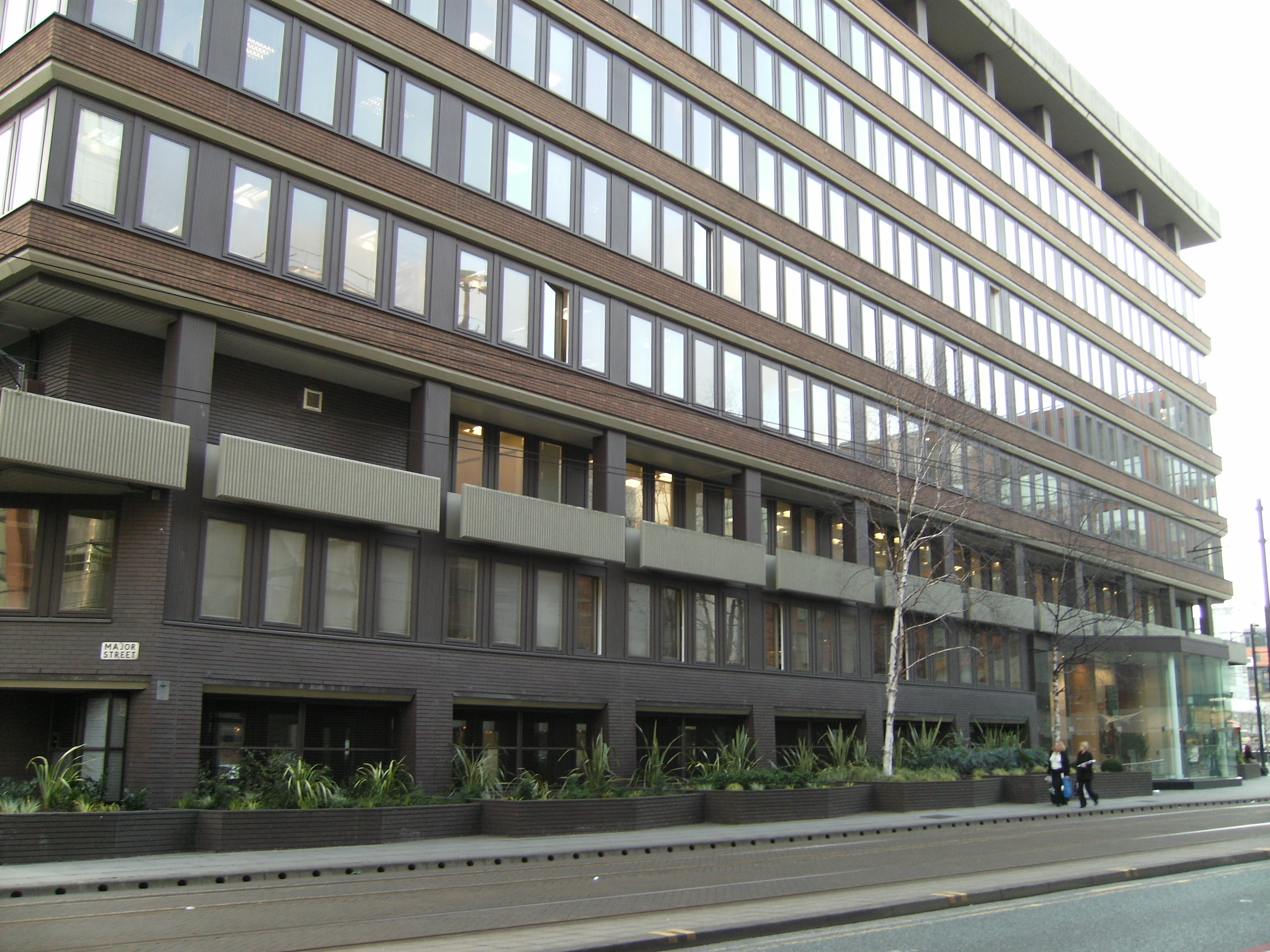
GMC County Hall (now known as Westminster House) in Manchester housed the Greater Manchester County Council until its abolition in 1986.

The arms of the Greater Manchester County Council, depicted here, became redundant with the abolition of the council in 1986 (though similar arms are used by the Greater Manchester Fire and Rescue Service).

The areas that were incorporated into Greater Manchester in 1974 previously formed parts of the administrative counties of Cheshire, Lancashire, the West Riding of Yorkshire, and eight independent county boroughs. By the early 1970s, this system of demarcation was described as "archaic" and "grossly inadequate to keep pace both with the impact of motor travel, and with the huge increases in local government responsibilities".

The Local Government Act 1972 reformed local government in England, with the act enacted on 1 April 1974, although Greater Manchester County Council (GMCC) had been running since elections in 1973. The area was given the name Greater Manchester and a metropolitan county designation. This was a two-tier counties and districts system. The leading article in The Times on the day the Local Government Act came into effect noted that the "new arrangement is a compromise which seeks to reconcile familiar geography which commands a certain amount of affection and loyalty, with the scale of operations on which modern planning methods can work effectively". Frangopulo noted that the creation of Greater Manchester "was the official unifying of a region which, through history and tradition, had forged for itself over many centuries bonds ... between the communities of town and village, each of which was the embodiment of the character of this region". The name Greater Manchester was adopted, having been favoured over Selnec following public consultation, despite opposition claiming that "Greater Manchester ... is a myth. An abomination. A travesty."

By January 1974, a joint working party representing Greater Manchester had drawn up its county Structure Plan, ready for implementation by the Greater Manchester County Council. The plan set out objectives for the forthcoming metropolitan county. The highest priority was to increase the quality of life for its inhabitants by improving the county's physical environment and cultural facilities which had suffered following deindustrialisation – much of Greater Manchester's basic infrastructure dated from its 19th-century growth, and was unsuited to modern lifestyles. Other objectives were to reverse the trend of depopulation in central-Greater Manchester, to invest in country parks to improve the region's poor reputation on leisure facilities, and to improve the county's transport infrastructure and patterns.

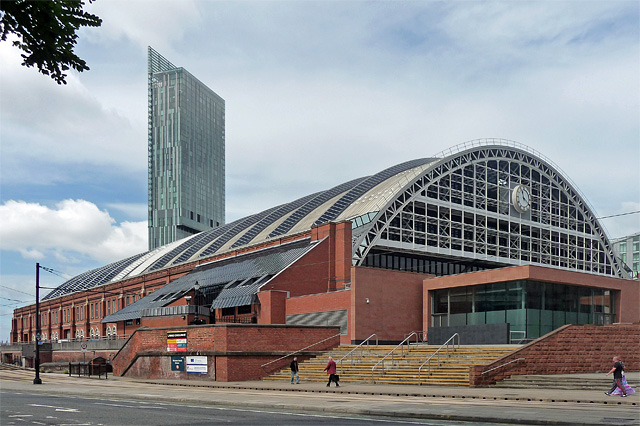
The Greater Manchester Exhibition Centre (better known as the G-Mex centre and now rebranded as Manchester Central) is the converted former Manchester Central railway station, in Manchester city centre, used for hosting the county's cultural events.

Because of political objection, particularly from Cheshire, Greater Manchester covered only the inner, urban 62 of the 90 former districts that the Royal Commission had outlined as an effective administrative metropolitan area. In this capacity, GMCC found itself "planning for an arbitrary metropolitan area ... abruptly truncated to the south", and so had to negotiate several land-use, transport and housing projects with its neighbouring county councils. However, a "major programme of environmental action" by GMCC broadly succeeded in reversing social deprevation in its inner city slums. Leisure and recreational successes included the Greater Manchester Exhibition Centre (better known as the G-Mex centre and now branded Manchester Central), a converted former railway station in Manchester city centre used for cultural events, and GMCC's creation of five new country parks within its boundaries. GMCC was, however, criticised for being too Manchester-centric by representatives from the outer suburbs.

A decade after they were established, the mostly Labour-controlled metropolitan county councils and the Greater London Council (GLC) had several high-profile clashes with the Conservative government of Margaret Thatcher, with regards overspending and high rates charging. Government policy on the issue was considered throughout 1982, and the Conservative Party put a "promise to scrap the metropolitan county councils" and the GLC, in their manifesto for the 1983 general election. Greater Manchester County Council was abolished on 31 March 1986 under the Local Government Act 1985. That the metropolitan county councils were controlled by the Labour Party led to accusations that their abolition was motivated by party politics: the general secretary of the National Association of Local Government Officers described it as a "completely cynical manoeuvre". Most of the functions of GMCC were devolved to the ten Greater Manchester metropolitan district councils, though functions such as emergency services and public transport were taken over by joint boards and continued to be run on a county-wide basis. The Association of Greater Manchester Authorities (AGMA) was established to continue much of the county-wide services of the county council. The metropolitan county continues to exist in law, and as a geographic frame of reference, for example as a NUTS 2 administrative division for statistical purposes within the European Union. Although having been a Lieutenancy area since 1974, Greater Manchester was included as a ceremonial county by the Lieutenancies Act 1997 on 1 July 1997.

=== Combined Authority ===
In 1998, the people of Greater London voted in a referendum in favour of establishing a new Greater London Authority, with mayor and an elected chamber for the county. The New Local Government Network proposed the creation of a new Manchester City Region based on Greater Manchester and other metropolitan counties as part of on-going reform efforts, while a report released by the Institute for Public Policy Research's Centre for Cities proposed the creation of two administrative city regions based on Manchester and Birmingham.

The Manchester City Region initially appeared in government documents as one of eight city regions defined in the 2004 strategic document Moving Forward: The Northern Way. In July 2007, The Treasury published its Review of sub-national economic development and regeneration, which stated that the government would allow those city regions that wished to work together to form a statutory framework for city regional activity, including powers over transport, skills, planning and economic development. The Manchester City Region encompassed fifteen local government districts: the cities of Manchester and Salford plus the metropolitan boroughs of Stockport, Tameside, Trafford, Bolton, Bury, Oldham, Rochdale and Wigan, together with the boroughs of High Peak, Warrington and the former boroughs of Congleton, Macclesfield and Vale Royal.

In January 2008, AGMA suggested that a formal government structure be created to cover Greater Manchester. The issue resurfaced in June 2008 with regards to proposed congestion charging in Greater Manchester; Sir Richard Leese (leader of Manchester City Council) said "I've come to the conclusion that [a referendum on congestion charging should be held] because we don't have an indirectly or directly elected body for Greater Manchester that has the power to make this decision". On 14 July 2008 the ten local authorities in Greater Manchester agreed to a strategic and integrated cross-county Multi-Area Agreement; a voluntary initiative aimed at making district councils "work together to challenge the artificial limits of boundaries" in return for greater autonomy from the central government of the UK. A referendum on the Greater Manchester Transport Innovation Fund was held in December 2008, in which voters "overwhelmingly rejected" plans for public transport improvements linked to a peak-time weekday-only congestion charge.

Following a bid from AGMA highlighting the potential benefits of mitigating the effects of the 2008 financial crisis, it was announced in the 2009 United Kingdom Budget that Greater Manchester and the Leeds City Region would be awarded Statutory City Region Pilot status, allowing (if they wanted) for their constituent district councils to pool resources and become statutory Combined Authorities with powers comparable to the Greater London Authority. The stated aim of the pilot was to evaluate the contributions to economic growth and sustainable development by Combined Authorities. The Local Democracy, Economic Development and Construction Act 2009 enabled the creation of a Combined Authority for Greater Manchester with devolved powers on public transport, skills, housing, regeneration, waste management, carbon neutrality and planning permission, pending approval from the ten councils. Such strategic matters would be decided on via an enhanced majority rule voting system involving ten members appointed from among the councillors of the metropolitan boroughs (one representing each borough with each council nominating one substitute) without the input of central government. The ten district councils of Greater Manchester approved the creation of the Greater Manchester Combined Authority (GMCA) on 29 March 2010, and submitted final recommendations for a constitution to the Department for Communities and Local Government and the Department for Transport and two days later the Communities Secretary John Denham approved the constitution and launched a 15-week public consultation on the draft bill together with the approved constitution.

Following requests by the Association of Greater Manchester Authorities, which was superseded by the GMCA, the new authority was created on 1 April 2011. On the same day, the Transport for Greater Manchester Committee was also formed from a pool of 33 councillors allocated by council population (roughly one councillor per 75,000 residents) to scrutinise the running of Greater Manchester's transport bodies and their finances, approve the decisions and policies of said bodies and form strategic policy recommendations or projects for the approval of the Combined Authority. On 3 November 2014, George Osborne, the Chancellor of the Exchequer, announced that there would be an eleventh member of the GMCA – a directly elected Mayor of Greater Manchester, with "powers over transport, housing, planning and policing" from 2017.

== Geography ==
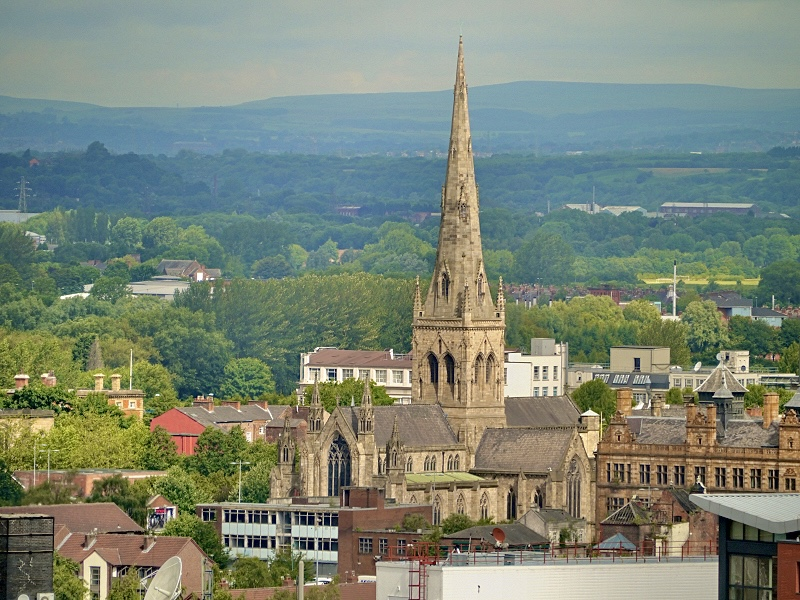
Salford, the second city of the county

Greater Manchester is a landlocked county spanning 493 sq mi (1,277 km^{2}). The Pennines rise to the north and east of the county with the West Pennine Moors in the northwest, the South Pennines in the northeast and the Peak District in the east. Several coalfields (mainly sandstones and shales) lie in the west of the county while the Cheshire Plain fringes the south. The rivers Mersey, Irwell and Tame run through Greater Manchester, all of which rise in the Pennines. Other rivers traverse the region as tributaries to the major rivers, including the Douglas, the Irk, and the Roch. Black Chew Head is the highest point in Greater Manchester which forms part of the Peak District National Park, rising 1,778 ft (542 m) above sea-level, within the parish of Saddleworth. Greater Manchester is characterised by its dense urban and industrial developments, which include centres of commerce, finance, retail and administration, as well as commuter suburbs and housing, interspersed with transport infrastructure such as light rail, roads and motorway, and canals. There is a mix of high-density urban areas, suburbs, semi-rural and rural locations in Greater Manchester, but land use is mostly urban. The built environment of Greater Manchester utilises red brick and sandstone prominently as a building material, alongside structures composed of modern materials, high-rise towers, and landmark 19th-, 20th- and 21st-century buildings in the city and town centres.

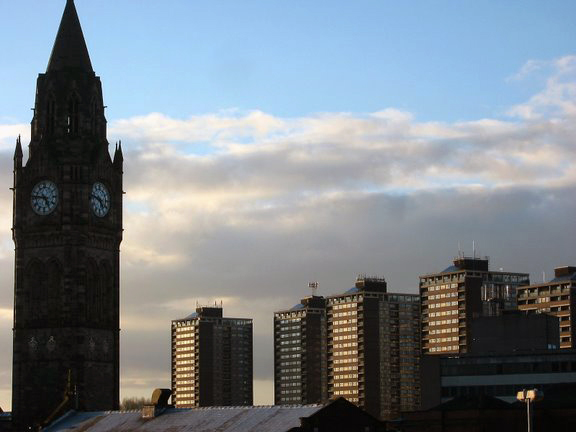
Rochdale, one of the large towns of Greater Manchester

Manchester city centre is the commercial and geographic heart of Greater Manchester, and with the adjoining parts of Salford and Trafford, is defined as Greater Manchester's "Regional Centre" for purposes of urban planning and public transport. Political and economic ties between the city centre and neighbouring Salford and Trafford have strengthened with the shift from town and district centres to metropolitan-level centres in England, and this area's high-rise landmark buildings provide a visual orientation point of reference as a central business district. However, Greater Manchester is also a polycentric county with ten metropolitan districts, each of which has a major town centre – and in some cases more than one – and many smaller settlements. The major towns encircle Manchester city centre, and between them are other outlying towns (such as Denton, Middleton and Failsworth) which are suburban to both the Regional Centre and the major town centres. Combined, these factors make Greater Manchester the most complex "polycentric functional urban region" in the UK outside London.

Metropolitan borough	Administrative centre	Constituent Towns
Bolton	Bolton	Blackrod, Farnworth, Horwich, Kearsley, Little Lever, South Turton, Westhoughton
Bury	Bury	Prestwich, Radcliffe, Ramsbottom, Tottington, Whitefield
Manchester	Manchester	Blackley, Cheetham Hill, Chorlton-cum-Hardy, Didsbury, Ringway, Withington, Wythenshawe
Oldham	Oldham	Chadderton, Shaw and Crompton, Failsworth, Lees, Royton, Saddleworth
Rochdale	Rochdale	Heywood, Littleborough, Middleton, Milnrow, Newhey, Wardle
Salford	Swinton	Eccles, Clifton, Little Hulton, Walkden, Worsley, Salford, Irlam, Pendlebury, Cadishead, Patricroft, Monton
Stockport	Stockport	Bramhall, Bredbury, Cheadle, Gatley, Hazel Grove, Marple, Romiley Woodley
Tameside	Ashton-under-Lyne	Audenshaw, Denton, Droylsden, Dukinfield, Hyde, Longdendale, Mossley, Stalybridge
Trafford	Stretford	Altrincham, Bowdon, Hale, Sale, Urmston, Partington
Wigan	Wigan	Abram, Ashton-in-Makerfield, Aspull, Astley, Atherton, Bryn, Golborne, Higher End, Hindley, Ince-in-Makerfield, Leigh, Orrell, Shevington, Standish, Tyldesley, Winstanley

The Greater Manchester Built-up Area is the conurbation or continuous urban area based around Greater Manchester, as defined by the Office for National Statistics. In 2011, it had an estimated population of 2,553,379, making it the second most populous built-up area in the UK, and occupied an area of 630.3 km^{2} (243.4 sq mi) at the time of the 2011 census. The European Union designate the conurbation as a single homogeneous urban city region. The Built-up Area includes most of Greater Manchester, omitting areas of countryside and small villages, as well as noncontiguous urban towns such as Wigan and Marple. Outside the boundary of Greater Manchester it includes several adjacent areas of settlement and a few outliers connected to the conurbation by ribbon development, such as Wilmslow and Alderley Edge in Cheshire, Glossop and Hadfield in Derbyshire, and Whitworth in Lancashire. This conurbation forms part of a megalopolis of 9.4 million across northern England.

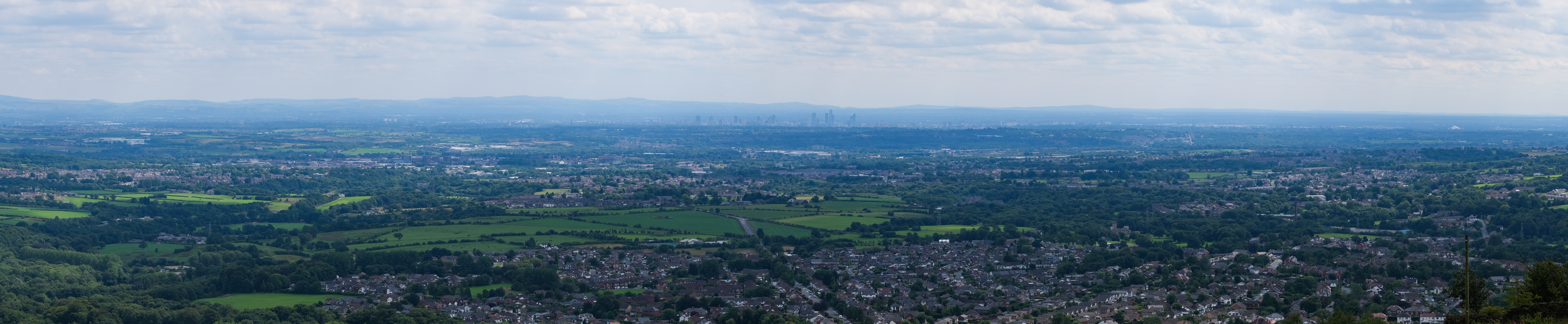
A view over Greater Manchester from the Peel Monument. The county is heavily urbanised and consists of vast built up areas and many settlements, fringed by sparsely populated countryside such as the West Pennine Moors.

=== Climate ===
Greater Manchester experiences a temperate maritime climate, like most of the British Isles, with relatively cool summers and mild winters. The county's average annual rainfall is 806.6 mm (31.76 in) compared to the UK average of 1,125.0 mm (44.29 in), and its mean rain days are 140.4 mm (5.53 in) per annum, compared to the UK average of 154.4 mm (6.08 in). The mean temperature is slightly above average for the United Kingdom. Greater Manchester has a relatively high humidity level, which lent itself to the optimised and breakage-free textile manufacturing process that took place around the county. Snowfall is not common in the built up areas because of the urban warming effect but the West Pennine Moors in the northwest, South Pennines in the northeast and Peak District in the east receive more snow, and roads leading out of the county can be closed due to heavy snowfall. They include the A62 road via Standedge, the Pennine section of the M62 and the A57, Snake Pass, towards Sheffield. At the most southern point of Greater Manchester, Woodford's Met Office weather station recorded a temperature of −17.6 °C (0.3 °F) on 8 January 2010.

Climate data for Manchester (MAN), 69 m (226 ft) amsl, 1991–2020 normals, extremes 1949–2004, precipitation days 1981–2010
Month	Jan	Feb	Mar	Apr	May	Jun	Jul	Aug	Sep	Oct	Nov	Dec	Year
Record high °C (°F)	14.3 (57.7)	19.0 (66.2)	21.7 (71.1)	25.1 (77.2)	26.7 (80.1)	31.3 (88.3)	32.2 (90.0)	33.7 (92.7)	28.4 (83.1)	27.0 (80.6)	17.7 (63.9)	15.1 (59.2)	33.7 (92.7)
Mean daily maximum °C (°F)	7.3 (45.1)	8.2 (46.8)	10.4 (50.7)	12.7 (54.9)	16.3 (61.3)	18.5 (65.3)	20.6 (69.1)	20.8 (69.4)	17.8 (64.0)	13.7 (56.7)	10.2 (50.4)	7.4 (45.3)	13.7 (56.6)
Daily mean °C (°F)	4.5 (40.1)	5.1 (41.2)	7.0 (44.6)	8.9 (48.0)	12.1 (53.8)	14.5 (58.1)	16.6 (61.9)	16.7 (62.1)	14.1 (57.4)	10.4 (50.7)	7.3 (45.1)	4.6 (40.3)	10.2 (50.3)
Mean daily minimum °C (°F)	1.7 (35.1)	2.0 (35.6)	3.6 (38.5)	5.0 (41.0)	7.8 (46.0)	10.4 (50.7)	12.5 (54.5)	12.6 (54.7)	10.3 (50.5)	7.1 (44.8)	4.4 (39.9)	1.7 (35.1)	6.6 (43.9)
Record low °C (°F)	−17.6 (0.3)	−13.1 (8.4)	−9.7 (14.5)	−4.9 (23.2)	−1.7 (28.9)	0.8 (33.4)	5.4 (41.7)	3.6 (38.5)	0.0 (32.0)	−4.7 (23.5)	−10.0 (14.0)	−14.0 (6.8)	−17.6 (0.3)
Average precipitation mm (inches)	67.3 (2.65)	61.1 (2.41)	51.3 (2.02)	60.6 (2.39)	59.1 (2.33)	62.6 (2.46)	59.8 (2.35)	73.1 (2.88)	71.2 (2.80)	95.1 (3.74)	86.0 (3.39)	84.0 (3.31)	831.2 (32.73)
Average precipitation days (≥ 1.0 mm)	13.1	9.7	12.3	11.2	10.4	11.1	10.9	12.0	11.1	13.6	14.1	13.5	142.9
Average snowy days	6	5	3	2	0	0	0	0	0	0	1	3	20
Average relative humidity (%)	83	81	77	74	72	74	76	77	79	81	83	84	79
Average dew point °C (°F)	2 (36)	2 (36)	3 (37)	4 (39)	7 (45)	9 (48)	11 (52)	12 (54)	10 (50)	8 (46)	5 (41)	3 (37)	6 (43)
Mean monthly sunshine hours	51.4	72.7	100.7	139.7	184.5	173.6	179.0	173.6	131.6	101.9	54.8	47.5	1,411
Mean daily sunshine hours	1.7	2.6	3.2	4.7	6.0	5.8	5.8	5.6	4.4	3.3	1.8	1.5	3.9
Average ultraviolet index	0	1	2	4	5	6	6	5	4	2	1	0	3
Source 1: Starlings Roost Weather NOAA (relative humidity and snow days 1961–1990)
Source 2: Starlings Roost Weather Current Results - Weather and Science Meteo Climat Time and Date: Average dew point (1985–2015) WeatherAtlas

=== Flora and fauna ===
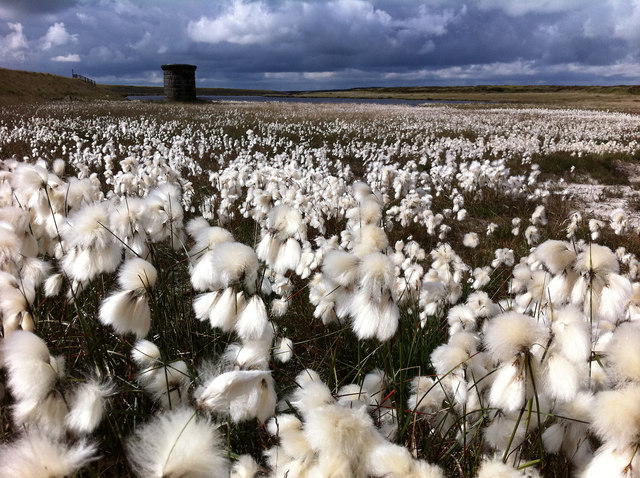
Common cottongrass (Eriophorum angustifolium), seen here at Light Hazzles Reservoir near Littleborough, was voted the county flower of Greater Manchester in 2002.

Contrary to its reputation for urban sprawl, Greater Manchester has green belt constraining urban drift, and a "wide and varied range" of wildlife and natural habitats. For instance, the wooded valleys of Bolton, Bury and Stockport, the moorlands north and east of Rochdale, Oldham and Stalybridge, and the reed beds between Wigan and Leigh, harbour flora and fauna of national importance. Mature woodland, scrubland, grassland, high moorland, mossland, agricultural land, lakes, wetlands, river valleys, embankments, urban parks and suburban gardens are habitats found in Greater Manchester which further contribute to biodiversity. The Greater Manchester Ecology Unit classifies Sites of Biological Importance.

The 21 Sites of Special Scientific Interest (SSSI) in Greater Manchester, and the 12.1 sq mi (31 km^{2}) of common land in Greater Manchester are of particular interest to organisations such as the Greater Manchester Local Record Centre, the Greater Manchester Biodiversity Project and the Manchester Field Club, which are dedicated to wildlife conservation and the preservation of the region's natural history. Among the SSSIs are Astley and Bedford Mosses which form a network of ancient peat bog on the fringe of Chat Moss, which in turn, at 10.6 sq mi (27 km^{2}) comprises the largest area of prime farmland in Greater Manchester and contains the largest block of semi-natural woodland in the county. The Wigan Flashes, such as those at Pennington Flash Country Park, are the by-product of coal mining, where subsidence has led to waterbodies collecting in the resulting hollows which form an important reed bed resource in Greater Manchester. Opened in 1979, Sale Water Park is a 152-acre (62 ha) area of countryside and parkland in Sale which includes a 52-acre (21 ha) artificial lake by the River Mersey.

Clover, sorrel, nettle and thistle are common, and grow wild in Greater Manchester. Common heather (Calluna vulgaris) dominates the uplands, such as Saddleworth Moor, which lies within the South Pennines and Dark Peak area of the Peak District National Park. The Rochdale Canal harbours floating water-plantain (Luronium natams), a nationally endangered aquatic plant. In 2002, Plantlife International launched its County Flowers campaign, asking members of the public to nominate and vote for a wild flower emblem for their county. Common cottongrass (Eriophorum angustifolium), a plant with fluffy white plumes native to wet hollows on high moors, was announced as the county flower of Greater Manchester.

The house sparrow, starling, and blackbird are among the most populous bird species in Greater Manchester; magpie and feral pigeon are common and breed in habitats across the county. Flocks of feral parakeets can be seen in many of south Manchester's parks, including Birchfields Park, Whitworth Park and Platt Fields Park. The birds' relocation to the UK has made them the country's "only naturalised parrot and the most northerly breeding parrot in the world". The South Pennines also support internationally important numbers of golden plover, curlew, merlin and twite. A number of Red Eared Terrapins, a species of small turtle, are known to inhabit the lake in Alexandra Park.

== Historic county boundaries ==
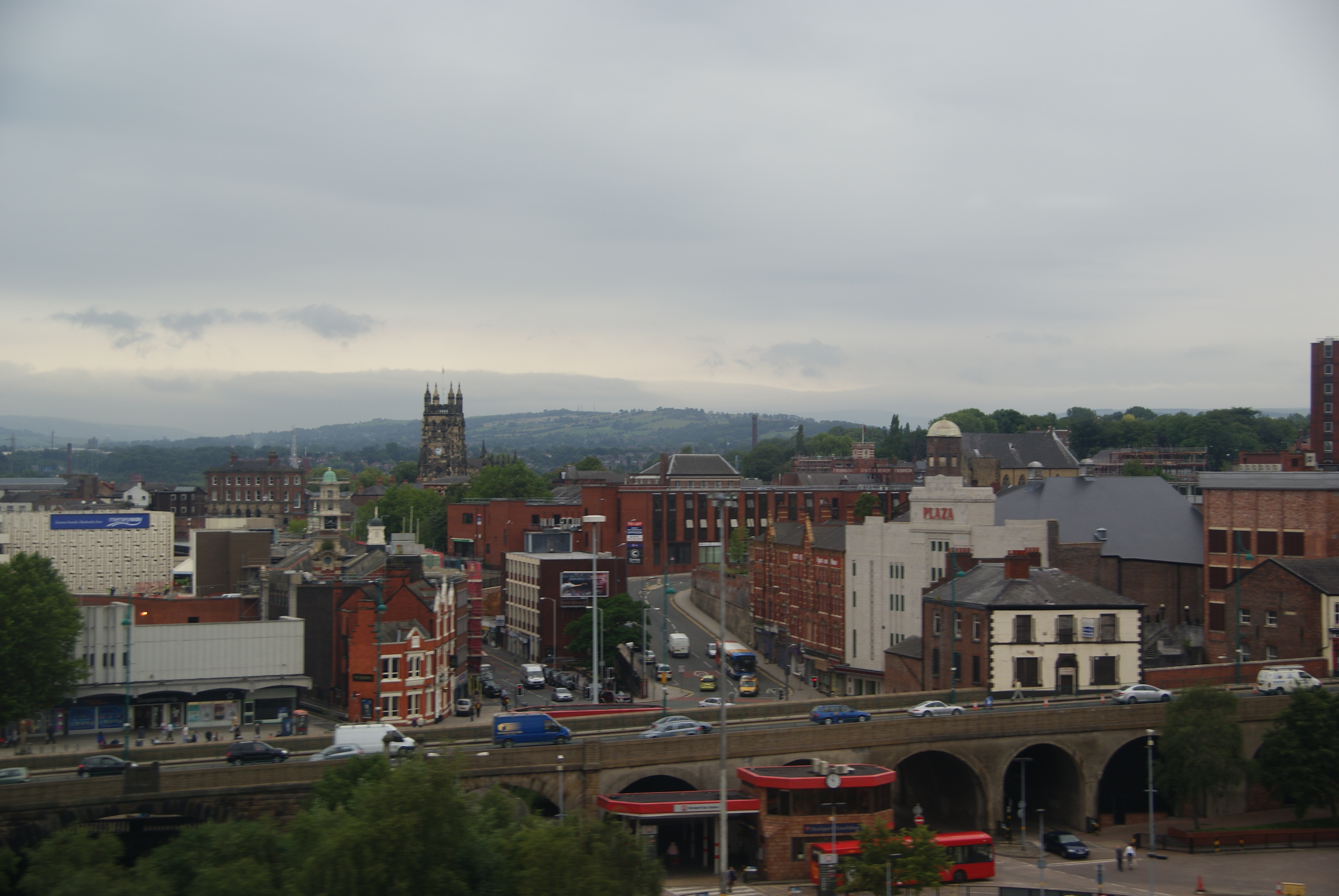
Stockport, one of the large towns of Greater Manchester and historically part of Cheshire

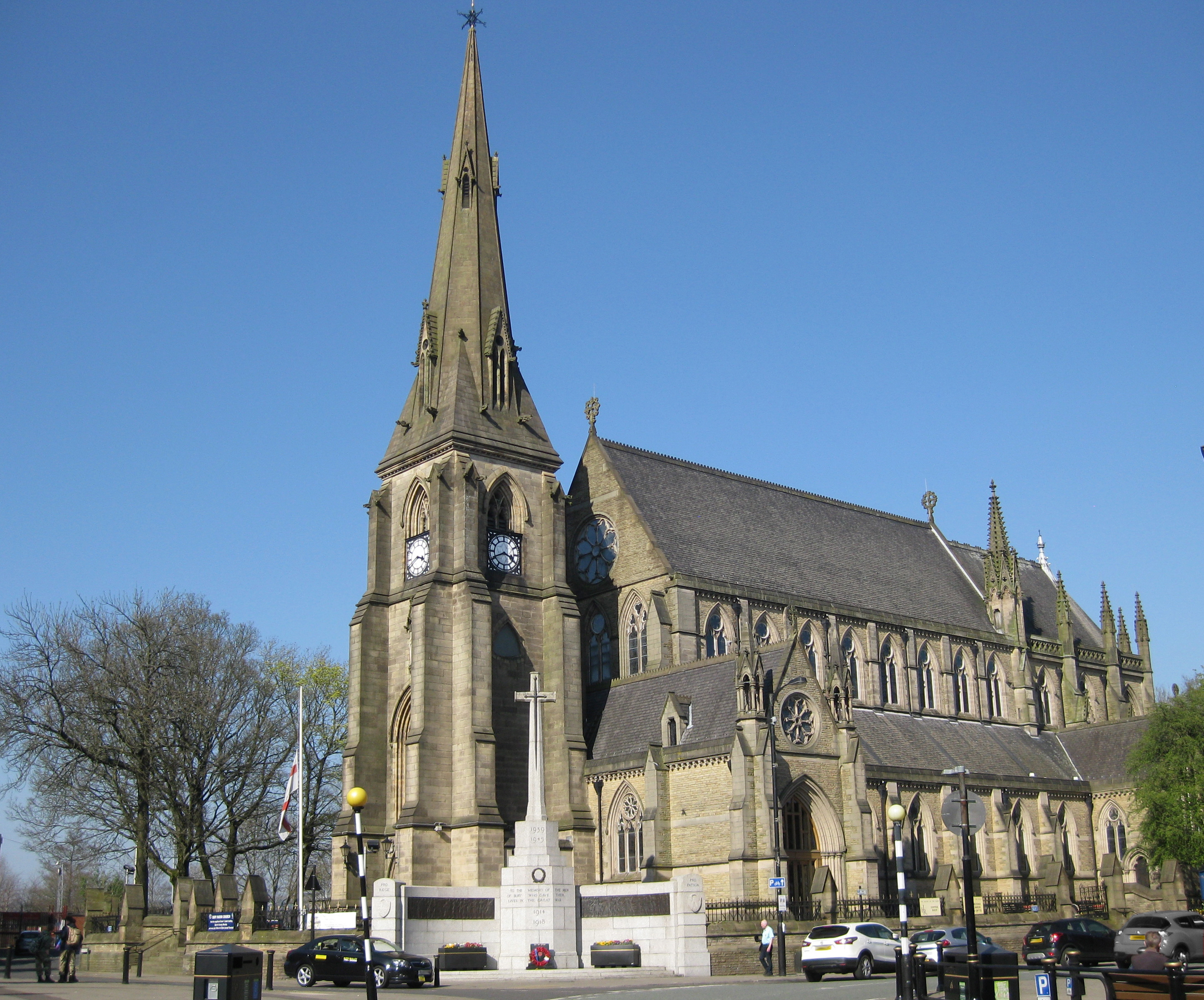
Bury, one of the large towns of Greater Manchester and historically part of Lancashire

Greater Manchester was formed from parts of Cheshire, Lancashire and the West Riding of Yorkshire. The historic boundary between Cheshire and Lancashire is along the River Mersey. The southern part of the county (Trafford, Stockport and Tameside) includes Altrincham, Sale, Stockport, Marple, Cheadle Hulme, Hyde and Stalybridge, which were all historically in Cheshire. Denton and Audenshaw in Tameside were historically part of Lancashire, as was the county north of the River Mersey including the cities of Manchester and Salford, Eccles, Bolton, Bury, Prestwich, Swinton, Pendlebury, Wigan, Leigh, Rochdale, Oldham, Ashton-under-Lyne, Stretford, Urmston, Old Trafford, Chadderton, Middleton, Heywood, Radcliffe, Milnrow, Horwich, Blackrod, Westhoughton, Littleborough, Atherton, Ashton-in-Makerfield and Golborne. The northeastern part of the county around Saddleworth was in the West Riding of Yorkshire.

=== Calls to rejoin historic counties ===
Since the formation of Greater Manchester, residents have debated their identities in the metropolitan and historic counties through heritage, culture and governance. Residents in Saddleworth in the Borough of Oldham have called for independence from Greater Manchester and Oldham Council and a new authority covering the Pennines around Greater Manchester and West Yorkshire, and the Saddleworth White Rose Society erected signs with the wording "The Historic West Riding of Yorkshire". A 2015 petition called for Wigan to apply for independence from Greater Manchester and rejoin Lancashire because of its heritage and location. There was a proposal for Horwich, Atherton, Blackrod and Westhoughton to form either a new part of Greater Manchester, or become a separate area back within Lancashire, possibly under the Borough of Chorley, although this was not pursued.

== Governance ==
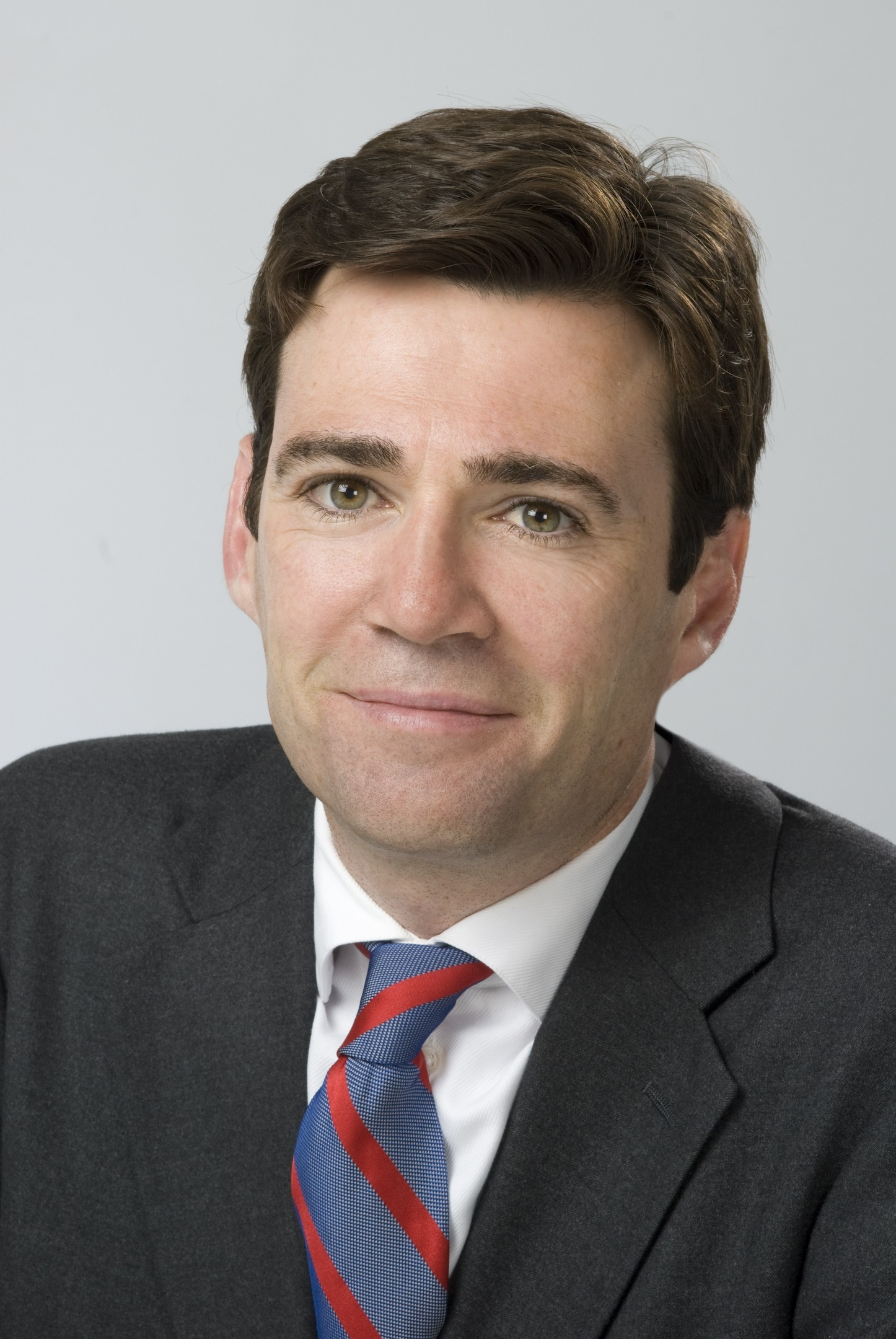
Andy Burnham served as the inaugural Mayor of Greater Manchester from May 2017 to June 2026

The Greater Manchester Combined Authority (GMCA) is the top-tier administrative body for the local governance of Greater Manchester. It was established on 1 April 2011 as a pilot combined authority, unique to local government in the United Kingdom. Upon formation, it consisted of ten indirectly elected members, each a directly elected councillor from one of the ten metropolitan boroughs that comprise Greater Manchester. The authority derives most of its powers from the Local Government Act 2000 and Local Democracy, Economic Development and Construction Act 2009, and replaced a range of single-purpose joint boards and quangos in 2011, to provide a formal administrative authority for Greater Manchester with powers over public transport, skills, housing, regeneration, waste management, carbon neutrality and planning permission. Functional executive bodies, such as Transport for Greater Manchester, are responsible for delivery of services in these areas. On 3 November 2014, the Devolution to the Greater Manchester Combined Authority agreement was signed to pass further powers and responsibilities, as well as the establishment of an elected Mayor of Greater Manchester. From April 2016, Greater Manchester became the first area of England to "get full control of its health spending" with a devolution deal which unites the region's health and social care systems under one budget under the control of local leaders, including Greater Manchester's new directly elected mayor. On 4 May 2017, Labour politician Andy Burnham was elected as the inaugural mayor, joining the GMCA as its eleventh member and serving as its leader.

Beneath the GMCA are the ten councils of Greater Manchester's ten districts, which are Bolton, Bury, the City of Manchester, Oldham, Rochdale, the City of Salford, Stockport, Tameside, Trafford and Wigan. These district councils have the greatest powers over public services, and control matters such as council tax, education provision, social housing, libraries and healthcare. Eight of the ten metropolitan boroughs were named after the eight former county boroughs that now compose the largest centres of population and greater historical and political prominence. As an example, the Metropolitan Borough of Stockport is centred on the town of Stockport, a former county borough, but includes other smaller settlements, such as Cheadle, Gatley, and Bramhall. The names of two of the metropolitan boroughs were given a neutral name because, at the time they were created, there was no agreement on the town to be put forward as the administrative centre and neither had a county borough. These boroughs are Tameside and Trafford, centred on Ashton-under-Lyne and Stretford, respectively, and are named with reference to geographical and historical origins. The lowest formal tier of local government in Greater Manchester are the parish councils, which cover the various civil parishes in Greater Manchester, and have limited powers over upkeep, maintenance and small grants.

For the first 12 years after the county was created in 1974, Greater Manchester had a two-tier system of local government, and the metropolitan borough councils shared power with the Greater Manchester County Council. The Greater Manchester County Council, a strategic authority based in what is now Westminster House off Piccadilly Gardens, comprised 106 members drawn from the ten metropolitan boroughs of Greater Manchester. It was a sub-regional body running regional services such as transport, strategic planning, emergency services and waste disposal. In 1986, along with the five other metropolitan county councils and the Greater London Council, the Greater Manchester County Council was abolished, and most of its powers were devolved to the boroughs. Between 1986 and 2011, the boroughs were effectively unitary authority areas, but opted to co-operate voluntarily under the Association of Greater Manchester Authorities (AGMA), which served to create a co-ordinated county-wide approach to issues of common interest to Greater Manchester, such as public transport and the shared labour market, as well as making representations to central government and the European Union.

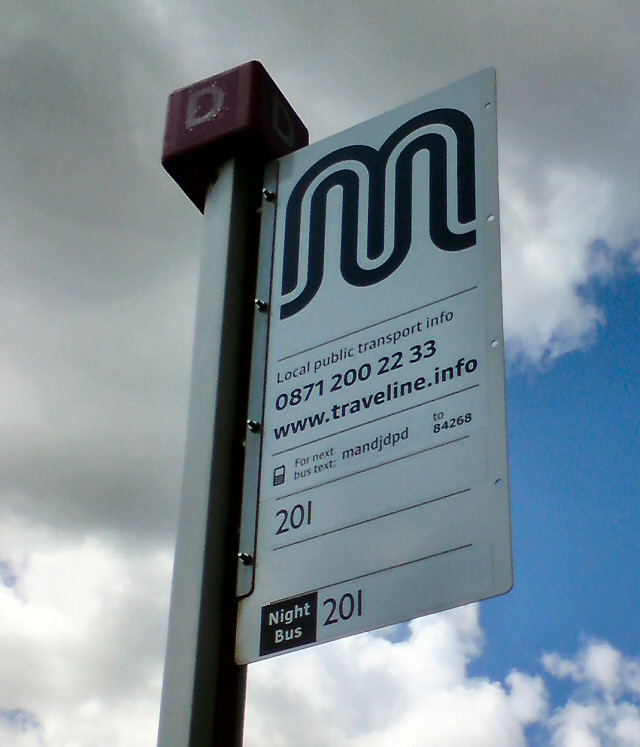
A bus stop in Denton bearing the logo of Transport for Greater Manchester (TfGM). TfGM is a functional executive body of the Greater Manchester Combined Authority and has responsibilities for public transport in Greater Manchester.

Although used as a "successful brand", Greater Manchester's politics have been characterised by "entrenched localism and related rivalries", historically resistant to regionalism. The major towns in Greater Manchester retain a "fierce independence", meaning Greater Manchester is administered using "inter-municipal coordination" on a broadly voluntary basis. That eight of the ten borough councils have (for the most part) been Labour-controlled since 1986, has helped maintain this informal co-operation between the districts at a county-level. After the abolition of the county council, the ten authorities of Greater Manchester co-operated voluntarily on policy issues like Local Transport Plans as well as funding the Greater Manchester County Record Office, and local services were administered by statutory joint boards. Now under the direction of the Greater Manchester Combined Authority, these joint boards are Transport for Greater Manchester (TfGM) which is responsible for planning and co-ordinating public transport across the county; the Greater Manchester Fire and Rescue Service, who are administered by a joint Fire and Rescue Authority; and the Greater Manchester Waste Disposal Authority. These joint boards are made up of councillors appointed from each of the ten boroughs (except the Waste Disposal Authority, which does not include the Metropolitan Borough of Wigan). Greater Manchester Police was formerly overseen by a joint police authority, but was briefly overseen by the Greater Manchester Police and Crime Commissioner from 2012 until the functions of that office were subsumed into the new regional mayoralty upon its creation in 2017. The ten borough councils are joint-owners of the Manchester Airport Group which controls Manchester Airport and three other UK airports. Other services are directly funded and managed by the local councils.

Greater Manchester is a ceremonial county with its own Lord-Lieutenant who is the personal representative of the monarch. The Local Government Act 1972 provided that the whole of the area to be covered by the new metropolitan county of Greater Manchester would also be included in the Duchy of Lancaster – extending the duchy to include areas which are historically in the counties of Cheshire and the West Riding of Yorkshire. Until 31 March 2005, Greater Manchester's Keeper of the Rolls was appointed by the Chancellor of the Duchy of Lancaster; they are now appointed by the Lord High Chancellor of Great Britain. The first Lord Lieutenant of Greater Manchester was Sir William Downward who held the title from 1974 to 1988. The current Lord Lieutenant is Warren James Smith. As a geographic county, Greater Manchester is used by the government (via the Office for National Statistics) for the gathering of county-wide statistics, and organising and collating general register and census material.

In terms of representation in the Parliament of the United Kingdom, Greater Manchester is divided into 27 parliamentary constituencies. Most of Greater Manchester is represented in Parliament by the Labour Party, and is generally considered a Labour stronghold.

The results of the 2024 United Kingdom general election in Greater Manchester are as follows:

Party	Votes	%	Change from 2019	Seats	Change from 2019
Labour	471,074	42.8%	▼5.1%	25	▲7
Reform	191,257	17.4%	▲11.9%	0	0
Conservative	173,735	15.8%	▼19.1%	0	▼9
Liberal Democrats	95,978	8.7%	▼0.1%	2	▲2
Green	89,203	8.1%	▲5.7%	0	0
Workers Party	49,976	4.5%	new	0	0
Others	29,520	2.7%	▲2.2%	0	0
Total	1,100,743	100.0		27	

== Demography ==
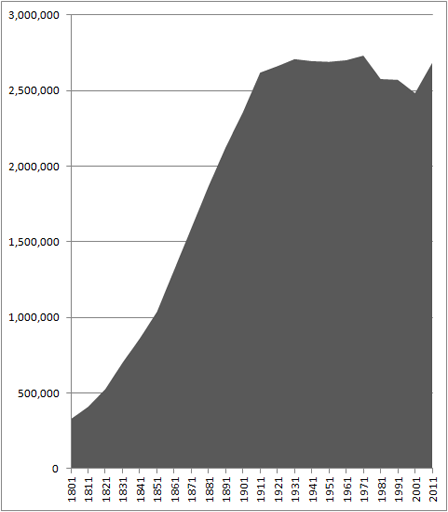
The population of Greater Manchester increased from around 328 thousand in 1801, to 2.8M in 2021.

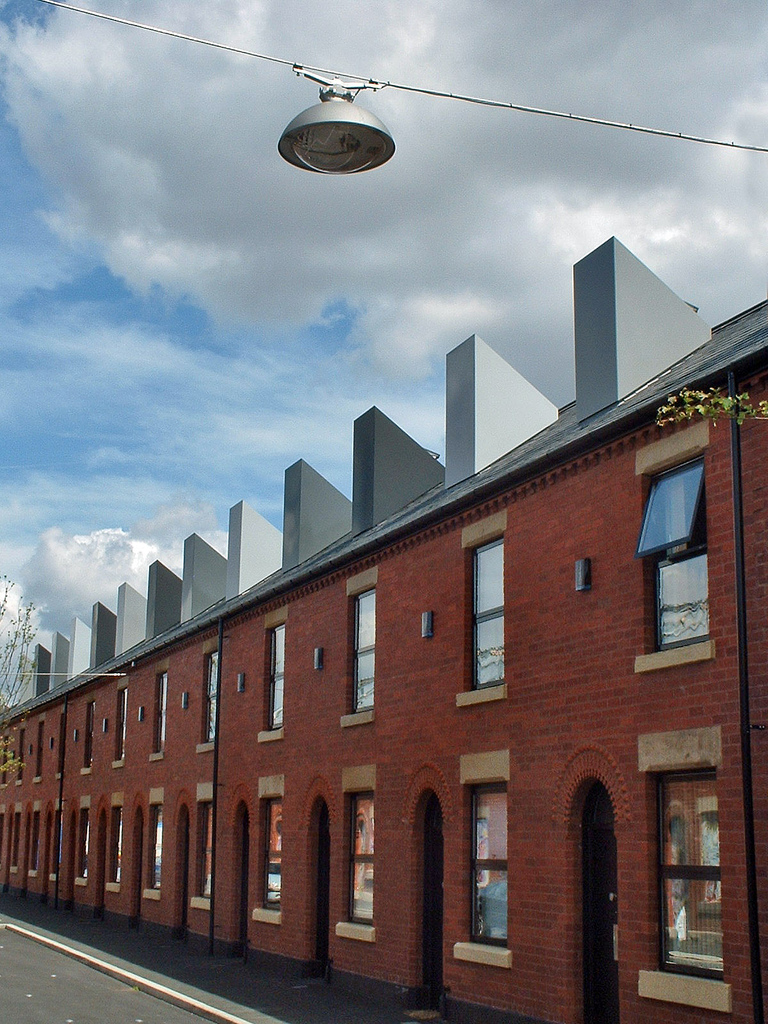
Much of Greater Manchester's housing stock consists of terraced houses constructed as low-cost dwellings for the populations of local factory towns.

=== Census population ===
Population changes for Greater Manchester

Year	Population	±%
1801	328,609	—
1811	409,464	+24.6%
1821	526,230	+28.5%
1831	700,486	+33.1%
1841	860,413	+22.8%
1851	1,037,001	+20.5%
1861	1,313,550	+26.7%
1871	1,590,102	+21.1%
1881	1,866,649	+17.4%
1891	2,125,318	+13.9%
1901	2,357,150	+10.9%
1911	2,617,598	+11.0%

Year	Population	±%
1921	2,660,088	+1.6%
1931	2,707,070	+1.8%
1941	2,693,775	−0.5%
1951	2,688,987	−0.2%
1961	2,699,711	+0.4%
1971	2,729,741	+1.1%
1981	2,575,441	−5.7%
1991	2,569,700	−0.2%
2001	2,482,352	−3.4%
2011	2,682,500	+8.1%
2021	2,867,800	+6.9%

Pre-1974 statistics were gathered from local government areas that now comprise Greater Manchester
Source: Great Britain Historical GIS.

=== Population of districts ===
Population of Greater Manchester by district (2025)
District	Land area		Population		Density (/km^{2})
District	(km^{2})	(%)	People	(%)	Density (/km^{2})
Bolton	140	11%	309,732	10%	2,216
Bury	99	8%	199,271	7%	2,004
Manchester	116	9%	588,256	19%	5,086
Oldham	142	11%	251,915	8%	1,770
Rochdale	158	12%	237,641	8%	1,503
Salford	97	8%	297,004	10%	3,056
Stockport	126	10%	304,879	10%	2,419
Tameside	103	8%	240,822	8%	2,335
Trafford	106	8%	240,981	8%	2,273
Wigan	188	15%	347,089	12%	1,845
Greater Manchester	1,276	100%	3,017,590	100%	2,365

Greater Manchester has a population of 2,867,800 (2021 Census). This makes it the third most populous county in England after Greater London and the West Midlands. The demonym of Greater Manchester is "Greater Mancunian". The Manchester accent and dialect, native to Manchester, is common in the city and adjacent areas, but gives way to "slower, deeper accents" towards Greater Manchester's fringes and suburbs.

Greater Manchester is home to a diverse population and is a multicultural agglomeration with an ethnic minority population comprising 8.5% of the total population in 2001. In 2008, there were over 66 refugee nationalities in the county. At the 2001 UK census, 74.2% of Greater Manchester's residents were Christian, 5.0% Muslim, 0.9% Jewish, 0.7% Hindu, 0.2% Buddhist, and 0.1% Sikh. 11.4% had no religion, 0.2% had an alternative religion and 7.4% did not state their religion. This is similar to the rest of the country, although the proportions of Muslims and Jews are nearly twice the national average.

Greater Manchester has historically been one of the principal centres of Jewish settlement in the United Kingdom, with a Jewish presence dating back to the late 18th century. In the mid-2020s, heightened concerns around antisemitism during protests led to increased policing, closer monitoring of demonstrations, the growth of protest movements including groups such as Palestine Action, and strengthened security around Jewish sites across parts of the United Kingdom, including Greater Manchester.

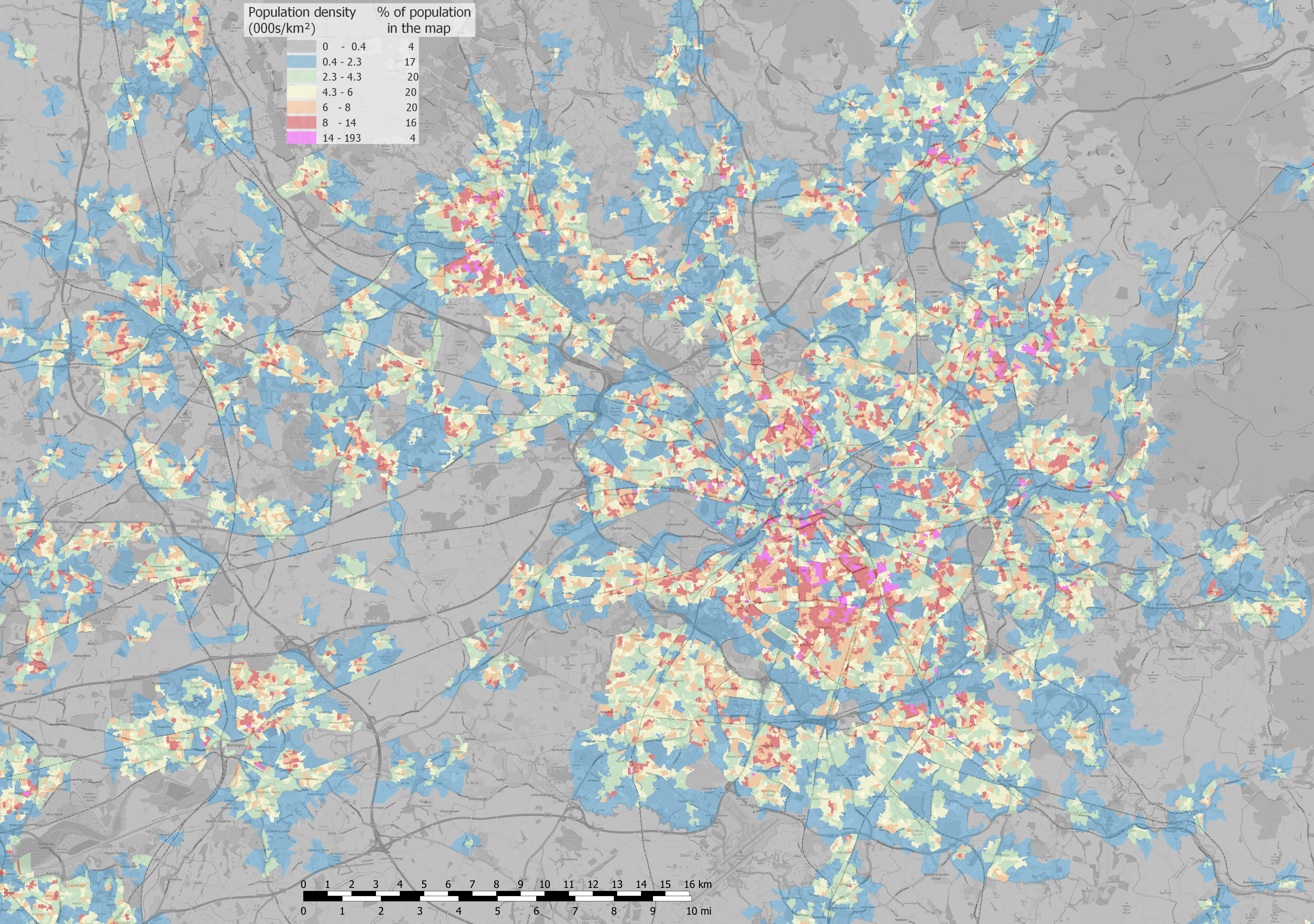
Population density map

Following the deindustrialisation of Greater Manchester in the mid-20th century, there was a significant economic and population decline in the region, particularly in Manchester and Salford. Vast areas of low-quality squalid terraced housing that were built throughout the Victorian era were found to be in a poor state of repair and unsuited to modern needs; many inner-city districts suffered from chronic social deprivation and high levels of unemployment. Slum clearance and the increased building of social housing overspill estates by Salford and Manchester City Councils lead to a decrease in population in central Greater Manchester. During the 1970s, 1980s and 1990s, the population of Greater Manchester declined by over 8,000 inhabitants a year. While Manchester's population shrank by about 40% during this time (from 766,311 in 1931 to 452,000 in 2006), the total population of Greater Manchester decreased by only 8%.

Greater Manchester's housing stock comprises a variety of types. Manchester city centre is noted for its high-rise apartments, while Salford has some of the tallest and most densely populated tower block estates in Europe. Saddleworth has stone-built properties, including farmhouses and converted weavers' cottages. Throughout Greater Manchester, rows of terraced houses are common, most of them built during the Victorian and Edwardian periods. House prices and labour markets differ in Greater Manchester between north and south, such that in the 2000s, the Housing Market Renewal Initiative identified Manchester, Salford, Rochdale and Oldham as areas with terraced housing unsuited to modern needs. In contrast, towns and villages in southern Greater Manchester, from Bramhall through Woodford to Altrincham constitute an arc of wealthy commuter towns. Altrincham in particular, with its neighbours Bowdon and Hale, forms a "stockbroker belt, with well-appointed dwellings in an area of sylvan opulence".

== Education ==
Greater Manchester has six universities: the Manchester Metropolitan University, the University of Bolton, the University of Law, the University of Manchester the University of Salford and The University Campus of Football Business . Together with the Royal Northern College of Music they had a combined population of students of 101,165 in 2007 – the third highest number in England behind Greater London (360,890) and the West Midlands (140,980), and the thirteenth highest in England per head of population. The majority of students are concentrated on Oxford Road in Manchester, Europe's largest urban higher education precinct.

As of 2010, further education in Greater Manchester is co-ordinated by the Greater Manchester Colleges Group, a joint venture composed of an association of 24 colleges in the region. Primary and secondary education within Greater Manchester are the responsibility of the constituent boroughs which form local education authorities and administer schools. The county has several independent schools such as Bolton School, Bury Grammar School, Manchester Grammar School, Oldham Hulme Grammar School, St Bede's College, Stockport Grammar School and Chethams School of Music.

== Economy ==
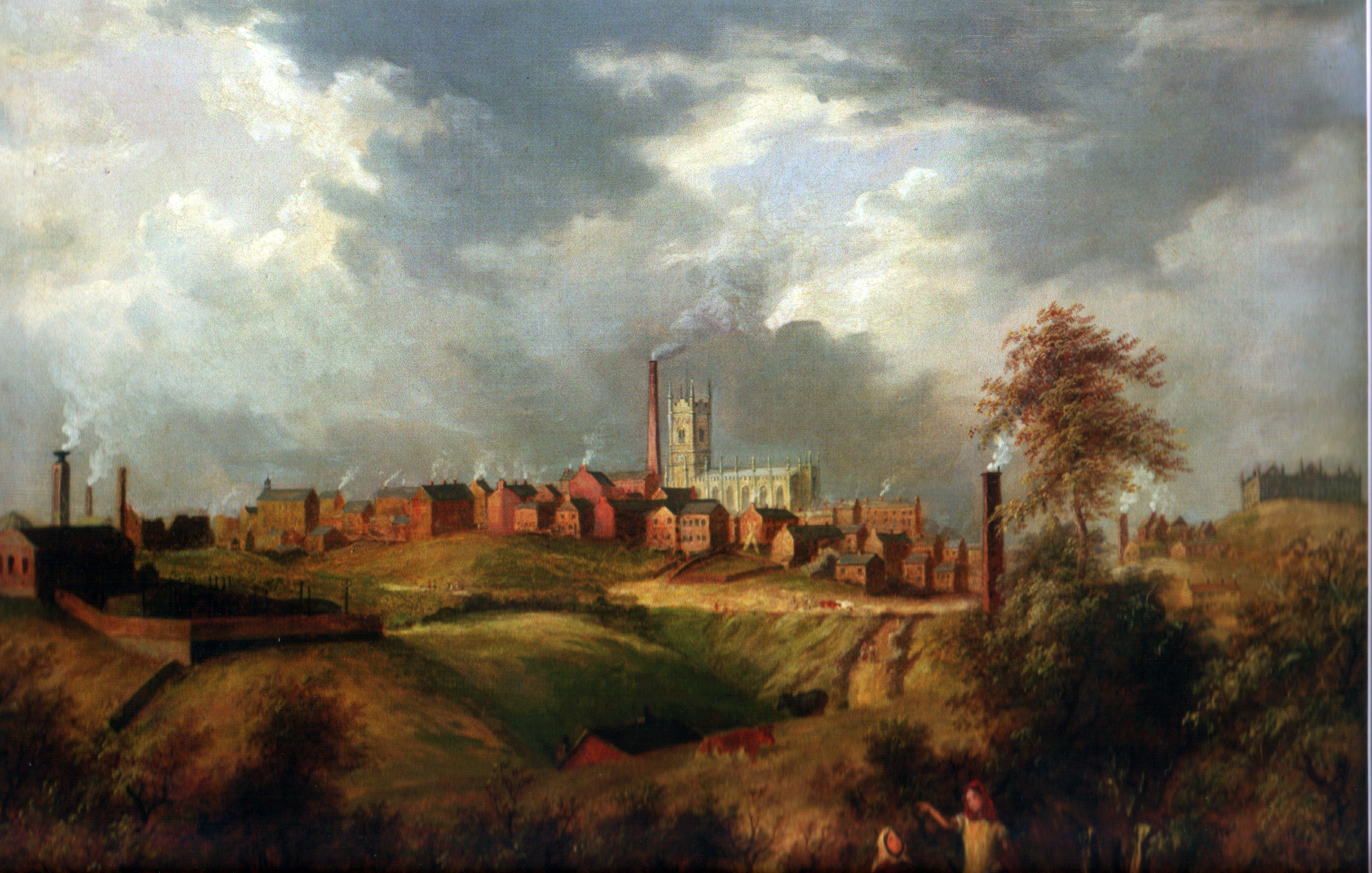
Oldham, painted during the Industrial Revolution by J. H. Carse. Many towns in Greater Manchester were built around the mills.

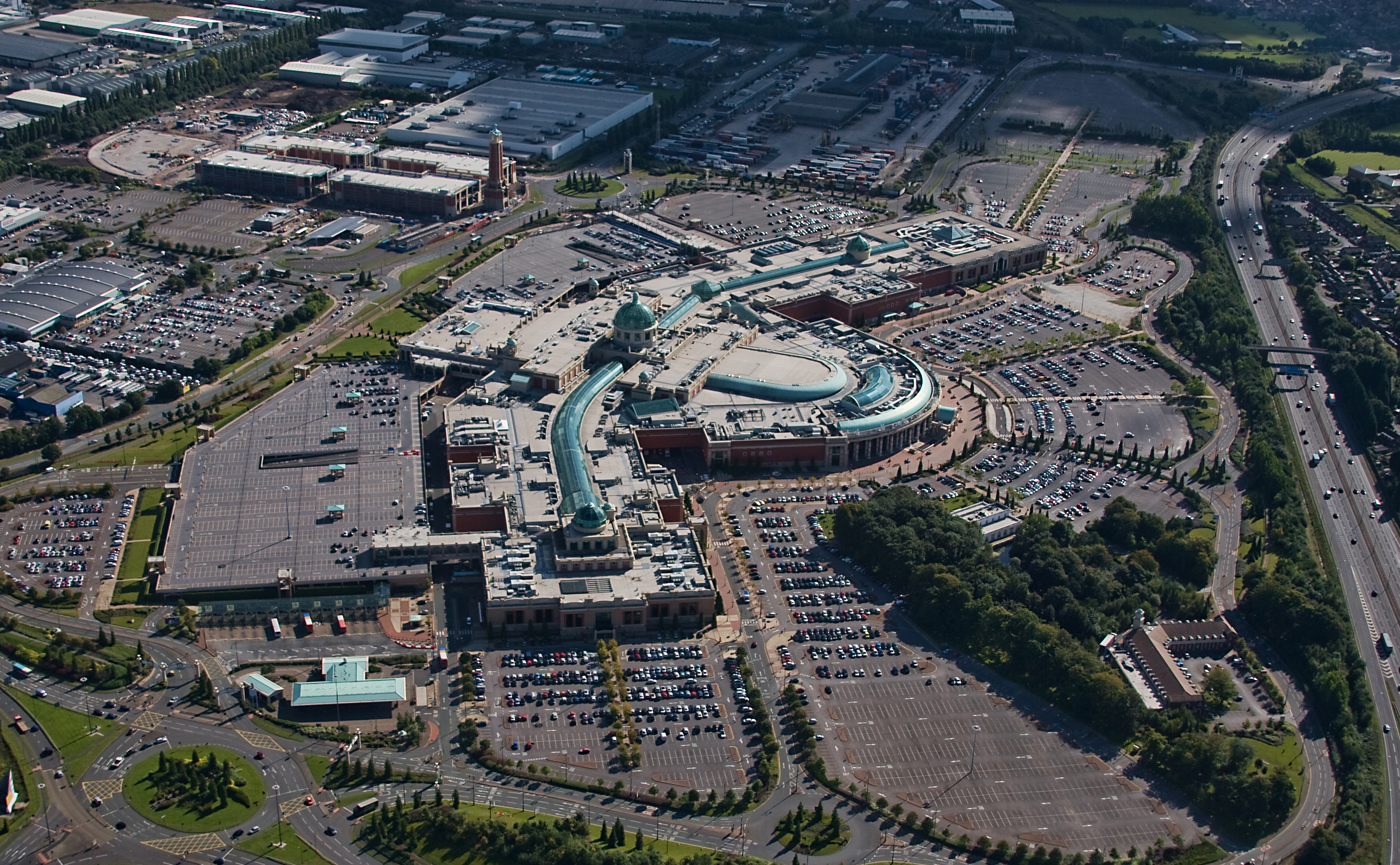
The Trafford Centre in Trafford is one of the largest shopping centres in the United Kingdom.

GVA and GDP by local authority district in 2021
District	GVA (£ billions)	GVA per capita (£)	GDP (£ billions)	GDP per capita (£)
Bolton	£6.3	£21,406	£7.3	£24,657
Bury	£3.6	£18,403	£4.2	£21,472
Manchester	£26.5	£48,107	£28.2	£51,330
Oldham	£4.0	£16,652	£4.7	£19,578
Rochdale	£3.9	£17,181	£4.5	£20,247
Salford	£8.7	£32,246	£9.6	£35,529
Stockport	£7.2	£24,370	£8.1	£27,425
Tameside	£3.5	£14,991	£4.1	£17,890
Trafford	£9.6	£40,769	£10.4	£44,192
Wigan	£5.5	£16,712	£6.5	£19,649
Greater Manchester	£78.7	£27,452	£87.7	£30,576

Much of Greater Manchester's wealth was generated during the Industrial Revolution, particularly textile manufacture. The world's first cotton mill was built in the town of Royton, and the county encompasses several former mill towns. An Association for Industrial Archaeology publication describes Greater Manchester as "one of the classic areas of industrial and urban growth in Britain, the result of a combination of forces that came together in the 18th and 19th centuries: a phenomenal rise in population, the appearance of the specialist industrial town, a transport revolution, and weak local lordship". Much of the county was at the forefront of textile manufacture during the Industrial Revolution and into the early-20th century; Peter Smith, Baron Smith of Leigh, chair of the Greater Manchester Combined Authority said "clearly, all of the Greater Manchester area was once at the heart of a very vibrant [textiles] industry", represented by former textile mills found throughout the county. The territory that makes up Greater Manchester experienced a rapid decline of these traditional sectors, partly during the Lancashire Cotton famine brought on by the American Civil War, but mainly as part of the post-war economic depression and deindustrialisation of Britain that occurred during the 20th century.

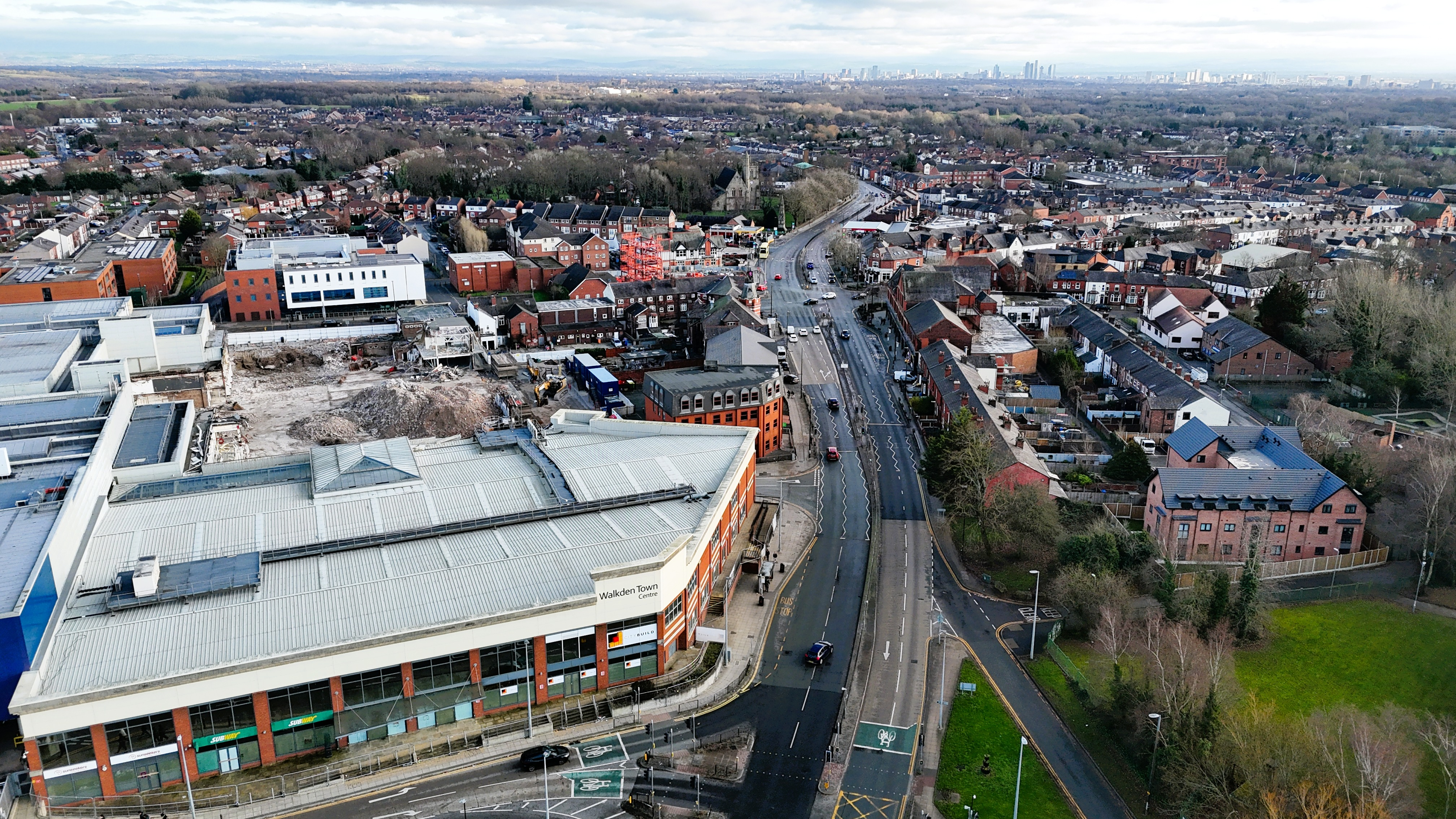
Significant regeneration works are ongoing across Greater Manchester. Walkden Town Centre regeneration is pictured (December 2025).

Considerable industrial restructuring has helped the region to recover from deindustrialisation and the demise of the mass production of textiles. Historically, the docks at Salford Quays were an industrial port, though are now (following a period of disuse) a commercial and residential area which includes the Imperial War Museum North and The Lowry theatre and exhibition centre. The BBC is now established in their new home at MediaCityUK, at Salford Quays. This is home to BBC North West, several BBC departments, including BBC Sport, Blue Peter and, since April 2012, BBC Breakfast. Rochdale and Manchester are connected to the history of the cooperative movement; the Rochdale Society of Equitable Pioneers (an early consumer co-operative) was founded in Rochdale in 1844, and The Co-operative Group, the UK's largest mutual business and North West England's biggest company, is headquartered at One Angel Square in central Manchester. Despite this economic diversification, as of November 2012, government plans are under development to revive textile production in Greater Manchester, and restore it as the national home of British textile manufacture.

Today, Greater Manchester is the economic centre of the North West region of England and is the largest sub-regional economy in the UK outside London and South East England. Greater Manchester represents more than £82.7 billion in GDP, more than Wales, Northern Ireland or North East England. Manchester city centre, the central business district of Greater Manchester, is a major centre of trade and commerce and provides Greater Manchester with a global identity, specialist activities and employment opportunities; similarly, the economy of the city centre is dependent upon the rest of the county for its population as an employment pool, skilled workforce and for its collective purchasing power. Manchester today is a centre of the arts, the media, higher education and commerce. In a poll of British business leaders published in 2006, Manchester was regarded as the best place in the UK to locate a business. It is the third most visited city in the United Kingdom by foreign visitors and is now often considered to be the second city of the UK.

At the 2001 UK census, there were 1,805,315 residents of Greater Manchester aged 16 to 74. The economic activity of these people was 40.3% in full-time employment, 11.3% in part-time employment, 6.7% self-employed, 3.5% unemployed, 5.1% students without jobs, 2.6% students with jobs, 13.0% retired, 6.1% looking after home or family, 7.8% permanently sick or disabled and 3.5% economically inactive for other reasons. The figures follow the national trend, although the percentage of self-employed people is below the national average of 8.3%. The proportion of unemployment in the county varies, with the Metropolitan Borough of Stockport having the lowest at 2.0% and Manchester the highest at 7.9%. In 2001, of the 1,093,385 residents of Greater Manchester in employment, the industry of employment was: 18.4% retail and wholesale; 16.7% manufacturing; 11.8% property and business services; 11.6% health and social work; 8.0% education; 7.3% transport and communications; 6.7% construction; 4.9% public administration and defence; 4.7% hotels and restaurants; 4.1% finance; 0.8% electricity, gas, and water supply; 0.5% agriculture; and 4.5% other. This was roughly in line with national figures, except for the proportion of jobs in agriculture which is only about a third of the national average of 1.5%, due to the overwhelmingly urban, built-up land use of Greater Manchester.

== Transport ==
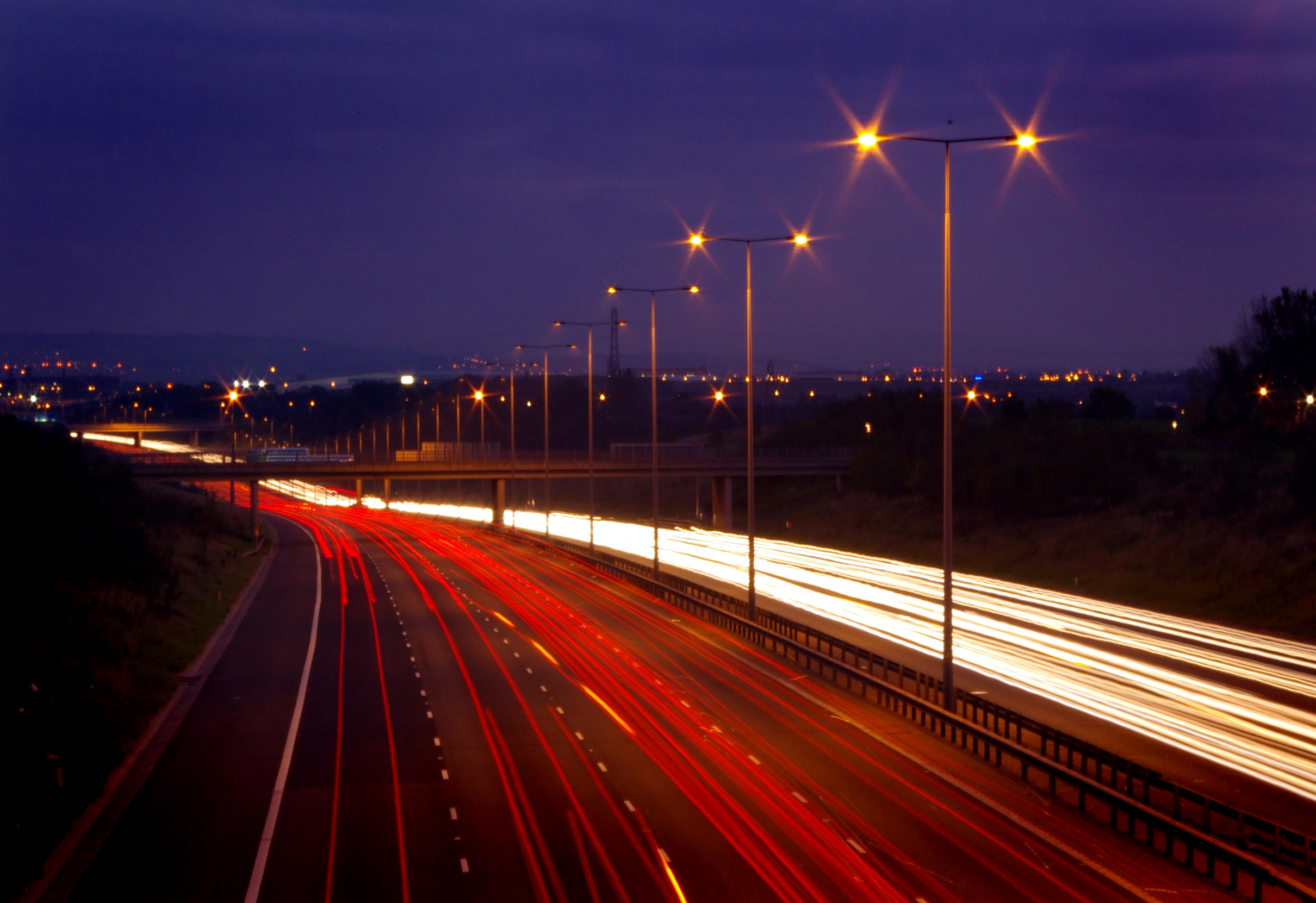
The M60 motorway, seen here at Failsworth, is an orbital motorway in Greater Manchester.

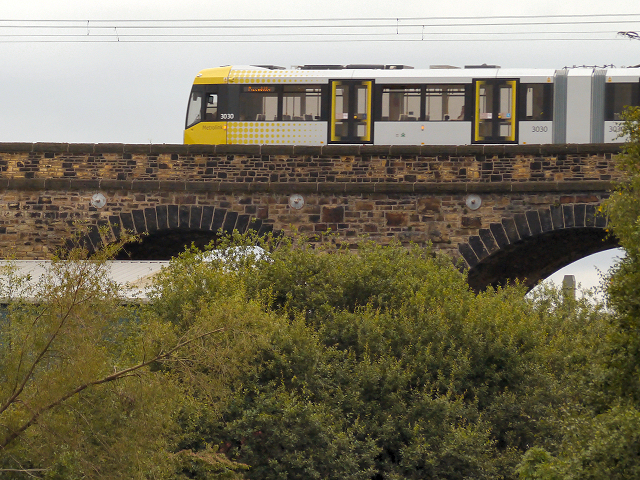
A Metrolink tram in Radcliffe, part of Greater Manchester's light rail network

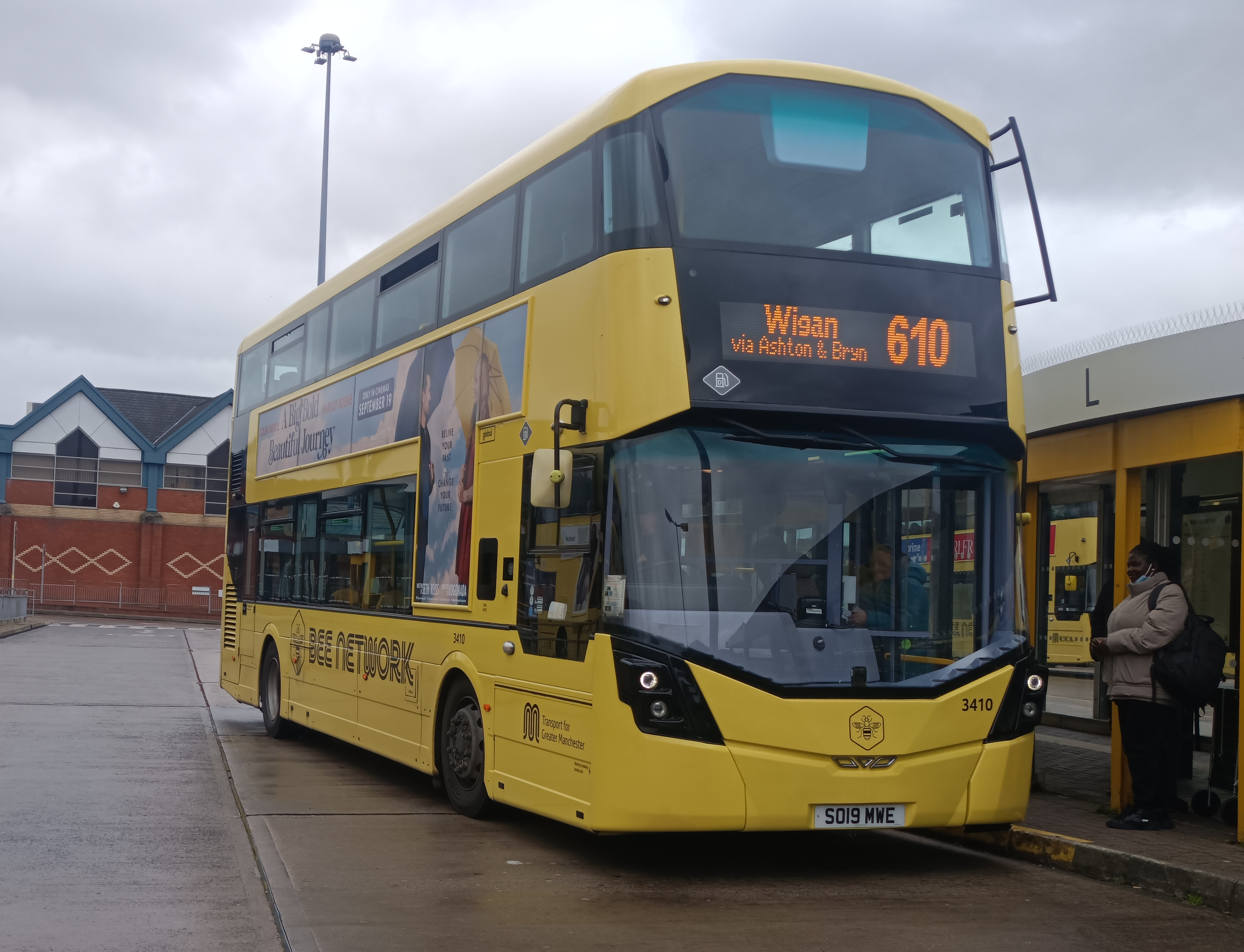
Go North West operate bus services in northern-Greater Manchester.

Public transport services in Greater Manchester are co-ordinated by Transport for Greater Manchester (TfGM), a public body with powers between those of a passenger transport executive and Transport for London, established as SELNEC PTE in 1969 in accordance with the Transport Act 1968. The original SELNEC Passenger Transport Executive was renamed as the Greater Manchester Passenger Transport Executive (GMPTE) when taken over by the Greater Manchester County Council on 1 April 1974 to co-ordinate public transport modes within the new county. The council had overall responsibility for strategic planning and all policy decisions covering public transport (such as bus and rail services) and highways. GMPTE's purpose was to secure the provision of a completely integrated and efficient system of passenger transport for Greater Manchester on behalf of the county council. In 1977, it was noted as the largest authority for public transport in the United Kingdom after London Transport. GMPTE was renamed as Transport for Greater Manchester in April 2011 when it became a functional body of the Greater Manchester Combined Authority and obtained powers additional to those of a regular passenger transport executive from central government.

Greater Manchester lies at the heart of the North West transport network. Much of the infrastructure converges at Manchester city centre with the Manchester Inner Ring Road, an amalgamation of several major roads, circulating the city centre. The county is the only place in the UK to have a fully orbital motorway, the M60, which passes through all of the boroughs except Bolton and Wigan. Greater Manchester has a higher percentage of the motorway network than any other county in the country, and according to the Guinness Book of World Records, it has the most traffic lanes side by side (17), spread across several parallel carriageways (M61 at Linnyshaw in Walkden, close to the M60 interchange). Greater Manchester's 85 mi (137 km) of motorway network saw 5.8 billion vehicle kilometres in 2002 – about 6% of the UK's total, or 89,000 vehicles a day. The A580 "East Lancs" road is a primary A road that connects Manchester and Salford with Liverpool. It was the UK's first purpose-built intercity highway and was officially opened by George V on 18 July 1934. Throughout 2008, there were proposals for congestion charging in Greater Manchester. Unlike the London scheme, two cordons would have been used, one covering the main urban core of the Greater Manchester Urban Area and another covering Manchester city centre.

Metrolink is Greater Manchester's light rail system, which began operating in 1992. Principally used for suburban commuting, as of December 2020 the 57 mi (92 km) long network consists of eight lines which radiate from Manchester city centre and terminate at Altrincham, Ashton-under-Lyne, Bury, East Didsbury, Eccles, MediaCityUK, Manchester Airport, Rochdale and Trafford Centre. The system is owned by TfGM and operated and maintained under contract by KeolisAmey. Greater Manchester has a heavy rail network of 142 route miles (229 km) with 98 stations, forming a central hub to the North West rail network. Train services are provided by private operators and run on the national rail network which is owned and managed by Network Rail. There is an extensive bus network which radiates from Manchester city centre. The largest providers are Diamond Bus North West, First Greater Manchester, Go North West, Metroline Manchester and Stagecoach Manchester. An extensive canal network also remains from the Industrial Revolution.

Manchester Airport, which is the third busiest in the United Kingdom, serves the county and wider region with flights to more worldwide destinations than any other airport in the UK. Since 2024 it serves 199 routes, making the airport thirteenth globally for total destinations served. The airport handled 28.07 million passengers in 2023.

The three modes of public surface transport in the area are heavily used. 19.7 million rail journeys were made in the then GMPTE-supported area in the 2005/2006 financial year – an increase of 9.4% over 2004/2005; there were 19.9 million journeys on Metrolink; and the bus system carried 219.4 million passengers.

The Bee Network is an integrated transport network for Greater Manchester, composed of bus, tram, cycling and walking routes. Transport for Greater Manchester (TfGM) is expected to have the complete network operational by 2024, with commuter rail services expected to be joining the network in 2030. Initially revealed in 2018, the project aims to create a London-style transport system, to encourage more people to take public transport instead of cars. The design of the network is inspired around the Greater Manchester symbol, the worker bee, with bus and tram liveries coloured yellow and black to represent this.

Greater Manchester is set to invest a further £40.7m in its walking, wheeling and cycling infrastructure as it progresses with its delivery of the largest active travel network in the country. Thirteen schemes have been allocated £23.7m in total, including a new active travel corridor along Chapel Street in Salford and a cycling and walking 'helix ramp' as part of Stockport Interchange.

== Sport ==
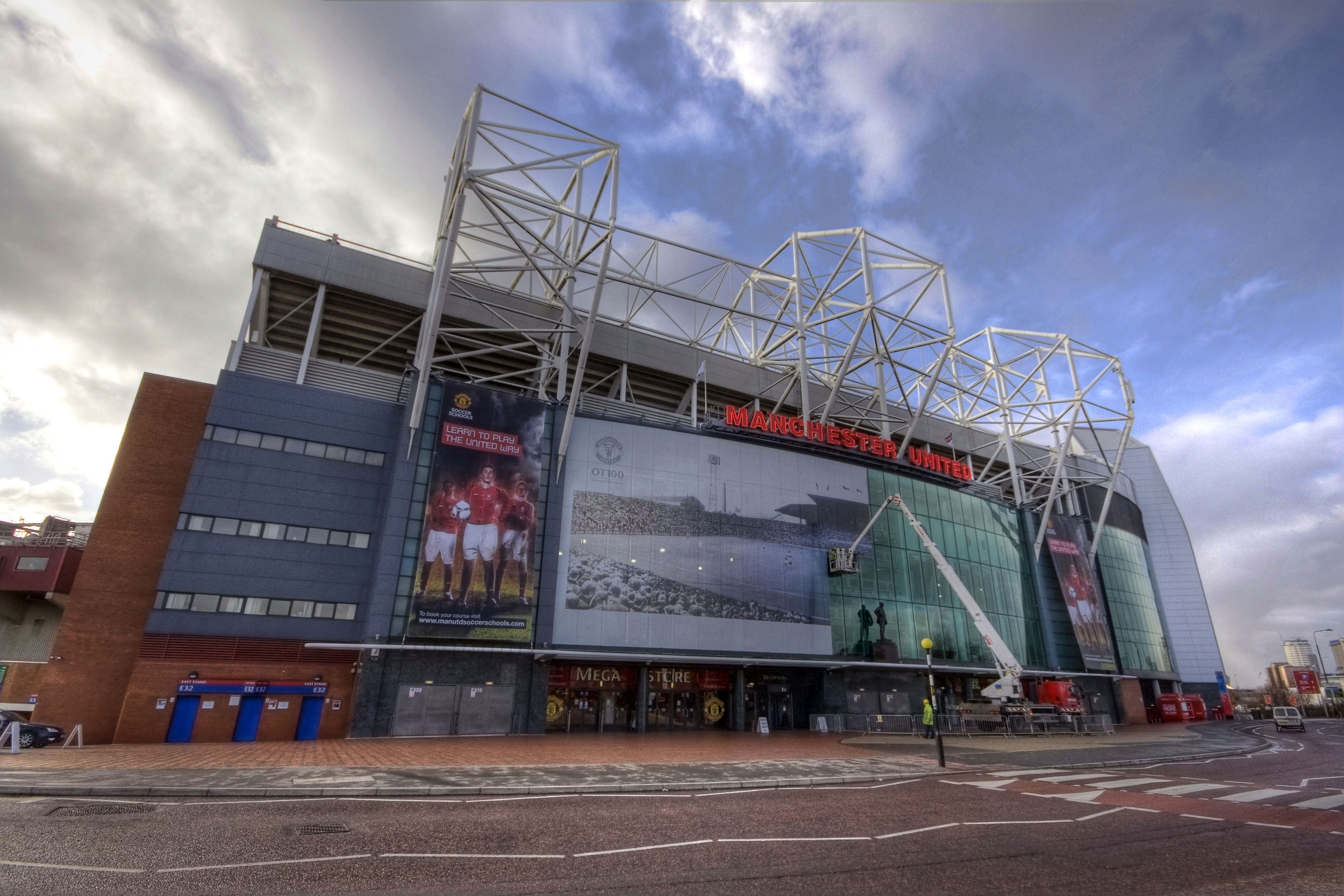
Old Trafford, home to Manchester United F.C.

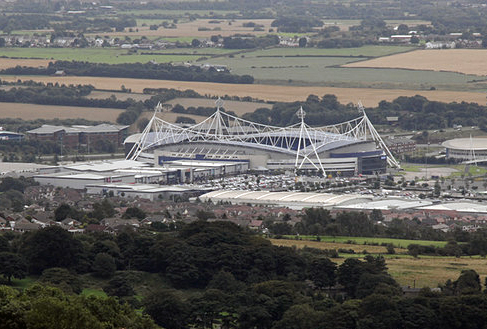
Bolton Wanderers F.C. are based at the Toughsheet Community Stadium, in Horwich.

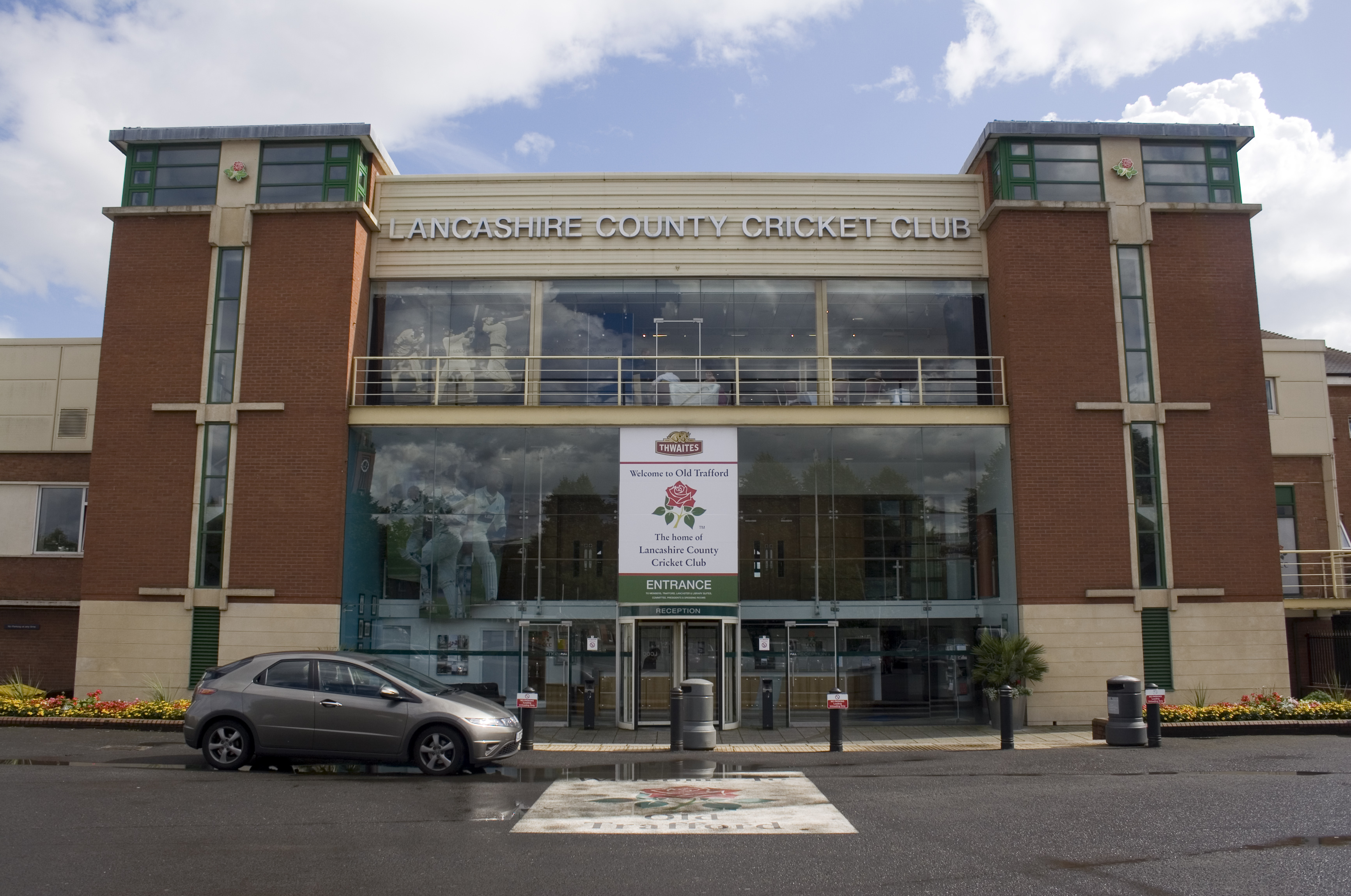
The main entrance of Old Trafford Cricket Ground

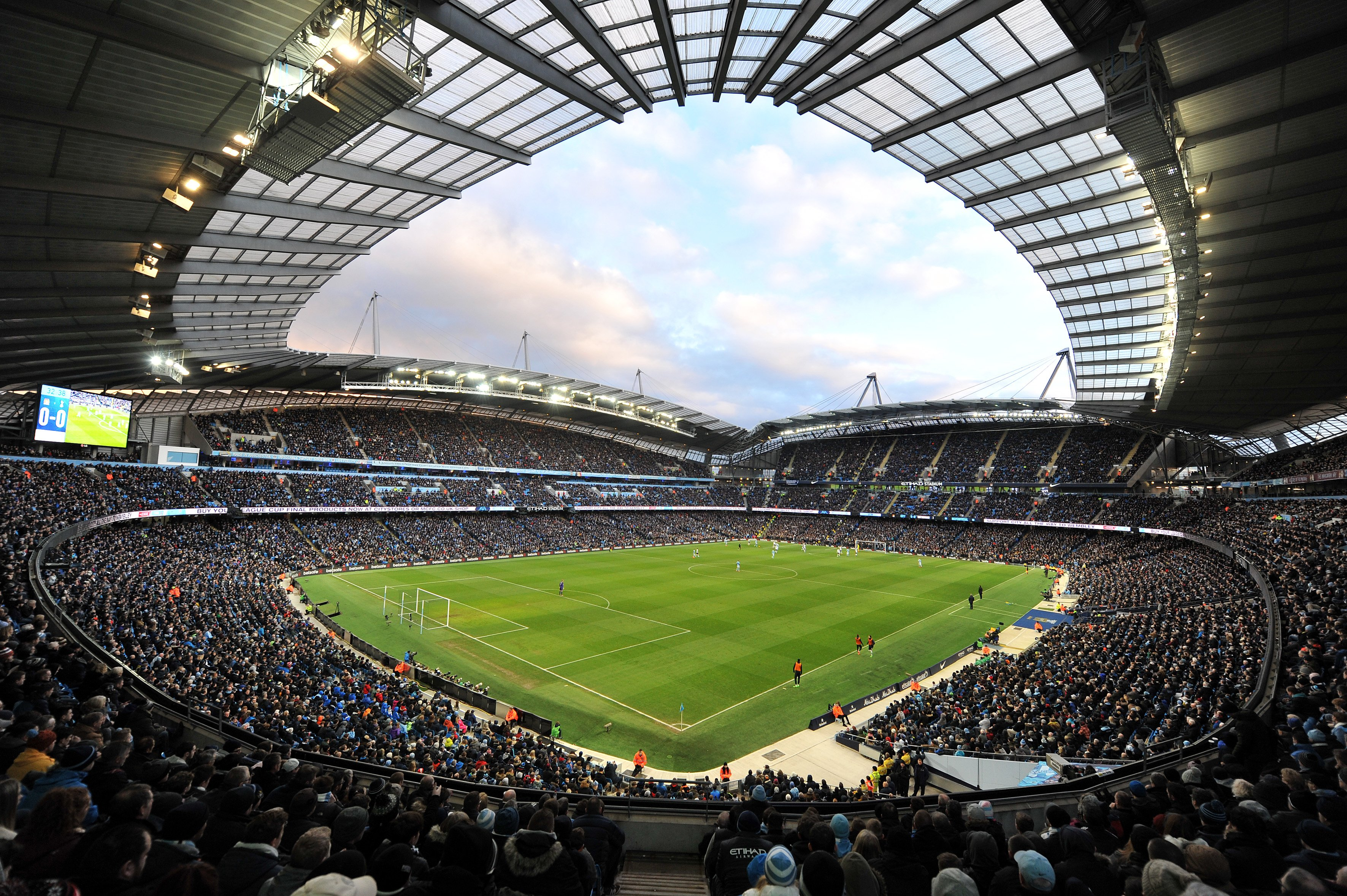
The City of Manchester Stadium, the main venue of the 2002 Commonwealth Games and home to Manchester City F.C.

Manchester hosted the 2002 Commonwealth Games which was, at a cost of £200M for the sporting facilities and a further £470M for local infrastructure, by far the biggest and most expensive sporting event held in the UK at the time and the first to be an integral part of urban regeneration. A mix of new and existing facilities were used. New amenities included the Manchester Aquatics Centre, Bolton Arena, the National Squash Centre, and the City of Manchester Stadium. The Manchester Velodrome was built as part of the Manchester bid for the 2000 Summer Olympics. After the Commonwealth Games the City of Manchester Stadium was converted for football use, and the adjacent warm-up track upgraded to become the Manchester Regional Arena. Other facilities continue to be used by elite athletes. Cambridge Policy Consultants estimate 4,500 full-time jobs as a direct consequence, and Grattan points to other long-term benefits accruing from publicity and the improvement of the area's image.

Association football is "woven into the cultural fabric of Greater Manchester", by way of its numerous football clubs – two of which play in the Premier League – which draw support, visitors and economic benefits to Greater Manchester valued at £330 million per year as of 2013. The Manchester Football Association is the sport's governing body in Greater Manchester, and is committed to its promotion and development. Manchester United F.C. are one of the world's best-known football teams, and in 2008 and 2017 Forbes estimated that they were the world's richest club. They have won the League Championship a record twenty times (most recently in 2012–2013), the FA Cup thirteen times, the Football League Cup six times and have been European Champions three times. Their Old Trafford ground has hosted the FA Cup Final, England international matches and the 2003 UEFA Champions League Final between Juventus and A.C. Milan. Manchester City F.C. moved from Maine Road to the City of Manchester Stadium after the 2002 Commonwealth Games. They have won the league championship nine times (most recently in 2023–24), the FA Cup seven times, the Football League Cup eight times and have been European champions once. Wigan Athletic F.C. are one of the county's younger sides and won their first major trophy in 2013, defeating Manchester City F.C. in the FA Cup final. As of season 2023–24, they play in League One, along with Bolton Wanderers F.C. In League Two are Salford City F.C. and Stockport County F.C., while Oldham Athletic A.F.C., Rochdale A.F.C. and Altrincham F.C. compete in the National League.

In rugby league, Wigan Warriors, Leigh Leopards, and Salford Red Devils compete in the Super League, the top-level professional rugby league football club competition in Europe. Wigan have won the Super League/Rugby Football League Championship twenty–one times, the Challenge Cup nineteen times, and the World Club Challenge three times. Swinton Lions, and Oldham R.L.F.C. play in the second tier Championship, whilst Rochdale Hornets play in the third tier League 1 There is also a large network of junior/community rugby league clubs across the metropolitan area which act as feeder teams to the elite sides, the most notable being Manchester Rangers. In rugby union, Sale Sharks compete in the Guinness Premiership, and won the league in 2006. Whitefield based Sedgley Park RUFC and Sale FC compete in National Division One, Manchester RUFC in National Division Two and Wigan side Orrell R.U.F.C. in National Division Three North.

Lancashire County Cricket Club began as Manchester Cricket Club and represents the (ancient) county of Lancashire. Lancashire contested the original 1890 County Championship. The team has won the County Championship nine times, most recently in 2011. Their Old Trafford ground, near the football stadium of the same name, regularly hosts test matches. Possibly the most famous took place in 1956, when Jim Laker took a record nineteen wickets in the fourth test against Australia. Cheshire County Cricket Club are a minor counties club who sometimes play in the south of the county.

The National Speedway Stadium in Gorton is the home to top-flight speedway team the Belle Vue Aces, and the Manchester Titans American football club. Greater Manchester was previously home to the largest Greyhound racing track in the United Kingdom, the Belle Vue Stadium, which closed in 2020. Professional ice hockey is held at the purpose-designed rink in Altrincham, the Altrincham Ice Dome, which host the Manchester Storm of the Elite Ice Hockey League and the Altrincham Aces of the National Ice Hockey League.

Horse racing has taken place at several sites in the county. The two biggest courses were both known as Manchester Racecourse – though neither was within the boundaries of Manchester – and ran from the 17th century until 1963. Racing was at Kersal Moor until 1847 when the racecourse at Castle Irwell was opened. In 1867 racing was moved to New Barnes, Weaste, until the site was vacated (for a hefty price) in 1901 to allow an expansion to Manchester Docks. The land is now home to Dock 9 of the re-branded Salford Quays. Racing then moved back to Castle Irwell which later staged a Classic – the 1941 St. Leger – and was home to the Lancashire Oaks (nowadays run at Haydock Park) and the November Handicap, which was traditionally the last major race of the flat season. Through the late-1950s and early-1960s the track saw Scobie Breasley and Lester Piggott annually battle out the closing acts of the jockey's title until racing ceased on 7 November 1963.

The Greater Manchester Athletics Association is the governing body of athletics in Greater Manchester, and organises events and competitions within Greater Manchester. The Greater Manchester Marathon is a long-distance running event along a 26-mile and 385-yard course throughout the borough of Trafford. Professional athletics takes place at the Regional Athletics Arena in Sportcity, which has hosted numerous national trials, Robin Park in Wigan, Longford Park in Stretford (home to Trafford Athletic Club), Woodbank Stadium in Stockport (home to Stockport Harriers) and the Cleavleys Track in Winton (home to Salford Harriers). The 12,000 seat Leigh Sports Village is a stadium and athletics venue home to the Leigh Harriers, Leigh Leopards Rugby League Club and the Manchester United W.F.C.

The Greater Manchester Community Basketball Club is an association which represents Greater Manchester in basketball. It supports a variety of teams, including Manchester Magic. The Greater Manchester County Crown Green Bowling Association appoints Junior, Senior and Veteran teams to represent Greater Manchester in the sport of bowls. Founded by Greater Manchester's ten district councils in 1996, GreaterSport is the County Sports Partnership for Greater Manchester which works closely with the sports and physical activity sectors and coordinates events such as the Greater Manchester Youth Games. The Greater Manchester Sports Fund aims to ensure that people in Greater Manchester aged 12–21 competing in any kind of sport, irrespective of background, are able to obtain grants of up to £750 so that they can better fulfil their potential.

== Culture ==
Art, tourism, culture and sport provide 16% of employment in Greater Manchester, with the proportion highest in Manchester. In 2014, Will Straw remarked that "Greater Manchester is a creative powerhouse", recognised for its cultural output in areas such as association football, media and digital content, and guitar and dance music.

=== Cuisine ===
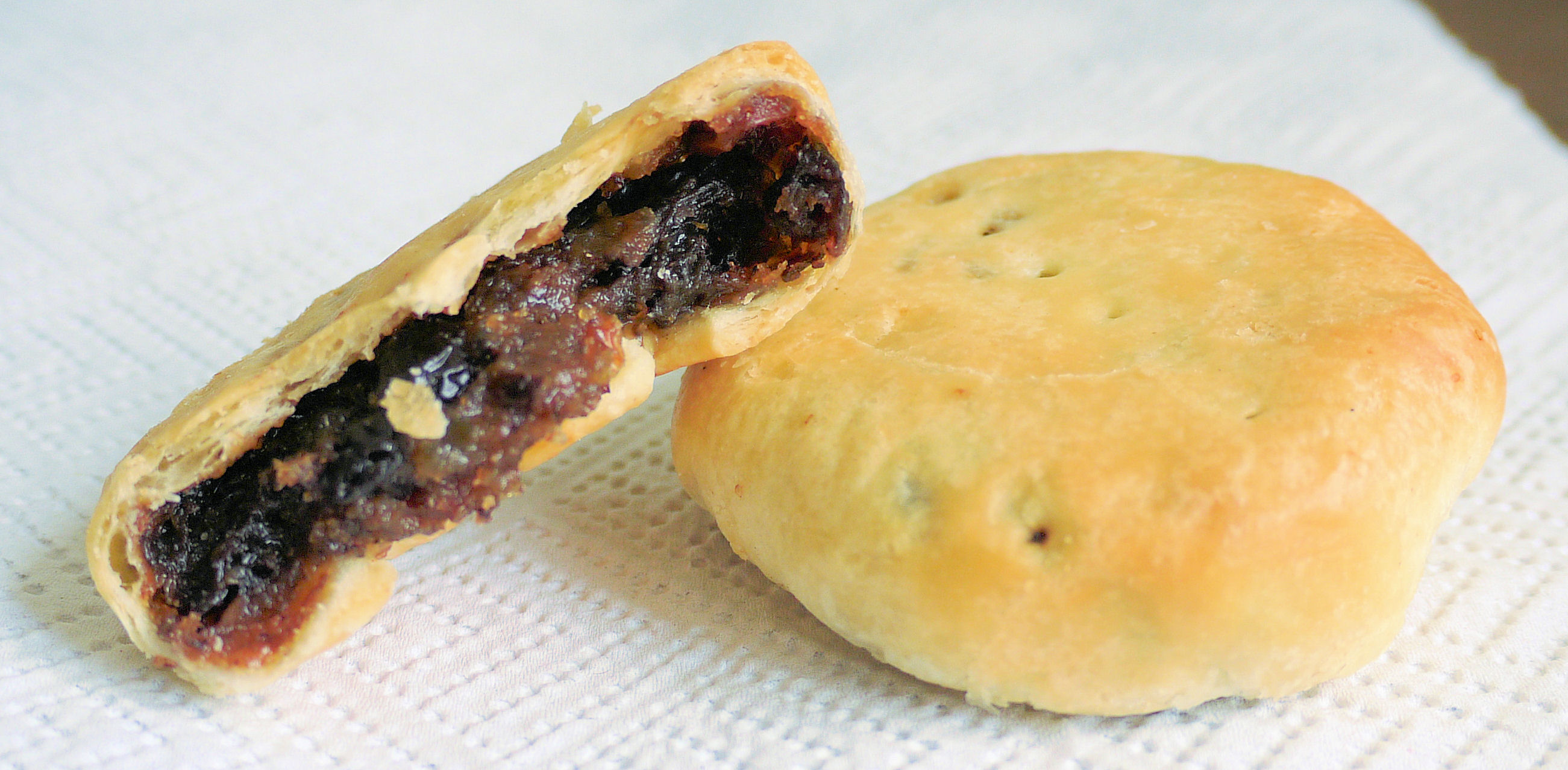
Eccles cake is a small round flaky pastry cake filled with currants, sugar and spice. It is native to Eccles.

There are several delicacies native to Greater Manchester. Savoury dishes include black pudding, a blood sausage typically associated with Bury and Bury Market; pasty barm, a combined pasty-barm cake created in Bolton; and rag pudding, a suet pastry pudding from Oldham filled with steak and onion and steamed in a cloth or wrapper to cook; the Manchester egg was introduced in 2010. Sweet dishes include Eccles cake – native to Eccles – a small round flaky pastry cake filled with currants, sugar and spice; Manchester tart, a baked tart which consists of a shortcrust pastry shell spread with raspberry jam, covered with a custard filling and topped with flakes of coconut; and Uncle Joe's Mint Balls, traditional sweet mild mints manufactured in Wigan since their inception in 1898. Vimto and Tizer are soft drinks invented in Manchester in 1908 and 1924 respectively. Boddingtons is a bitter developed in Manchester and promoted as the "Cream of Manchester" in a popular 1990s advertising campaign credited with raising the city's profile.

The Greater Manchester Campaign for Real Ale is a branch of the national Campaign for Real Ale, an advocacy group that supports, promotes and preserves the beer and drinks industry, and recognising outstanding venues with awards; The Nursery in Heaton Norris was its National Pub of the Year in 2001, and The Baum in Rochdale was its National Pub of the Year in 2012. The Manchester Food and Drink Festival was launched in 1997 as an urban beverage and gastronomy fair, principally held in Manchester city centre with further events throughout Greater Manchester; smaller separate local events include the Prestwich Food and Drink Festival, the annual World Pie Eating Championship in Wigan, and the annual Ramsbottom Chocolate Festival. As of 2025, Manchester has 2 Michelin Star restaurants: Mana (awarded in 2019), and Skof (awarded in 2025). The region also has three eateries in the Bib Gourmand category.

=== Galleries, museums and exhibitions ===
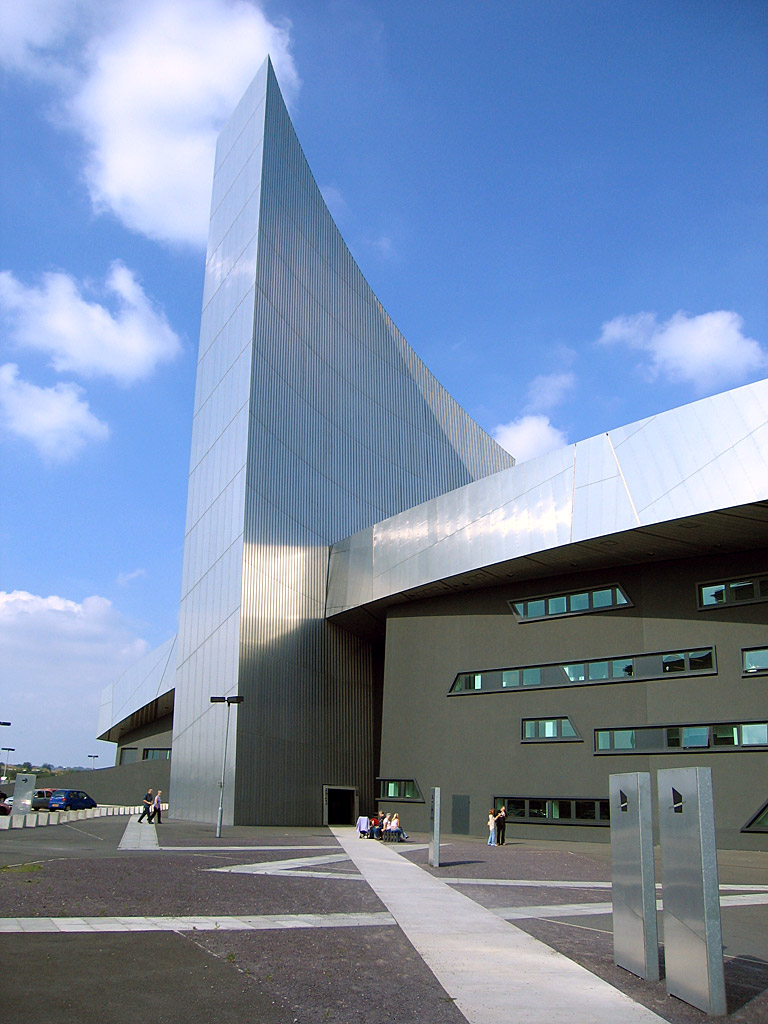
The Imperial War Museum North, in Trafford Park, was designed by Daniel Libeskind, and is one of the Imperial War Museum's five branches.

The Greater Manchester Museums Group (GMMG) is a partnership of eight of the ten Museum Services in Greater Manchester. Its exhibition centres include: Gallery Oldham, which has in the past featured work by Pablo Picasso; Salford Museum and Art Gallery, a local museum with a recreated Victorian street; and Bolton Museum, which houses material from private collectors, including geological specimens from the estate of Caroline Birley. Separate from the GMMG is The Lowry at Salford Quays, which has a changing display of L. S. Lowry's work alongside travelling exhibitions. Manchester Art Gallery is a major provincial art gallery noted for its collection of Pre-Raphaelite art and housed in a Grade I listed building by Charles Barry.

Greater Manchester's museums showcase the county's industrial and social heritage. The Hat Works in Stockport is the UK's only museum dedicated to the hatting industry; the museum moved in 2000 to a Grade II listed Victorian mill, previously a hat factory. The Museum of Science and Industry in Manchester, amongst other displays, charts the rise of science and industry and especially the part Manchester played in its development; the Museums, Libraries and Archives Council described the displays as "pre-eminent collections of national and international importance". Urbis began its life as a museum of the modern city, which attempted to explain the effects and experiences of life in the city. It was then transformed into an exhibition centre, which had its most successful year in 2006. Urbis entered its third phase since opening in 2012 as the National Football Museum. Stockport Air Raid Shelters uses a mile of tunnels, built to accommodate 6,500 people, to illustrate life in the Second World War's air raid shelters. The Imperial War Museum North in Trafford Park is one of the Imperial War Museum's five branches. Alongside exhibitions of war machinery are displays describing how people's lives are affected by war. The Museum of Transport in Manchester, which opened in 1979, has one of the largest collections of vehicles in the country. The People's History Museum is "the national centre for the collection, conservation, interpretation and study of material relating to the history of working people in Britain". The Pankhurst Museum is based in the early feminist Emmeline Pankhurst's former home and includes a parlour laid out in contemporary style. Manchester United, Manchester City, and Lancashire CCC all have dedicated museums illustrating their histories. Wigan Pier, best known from George Orwell's book The Road to Wigan Pier, was the name of a wharf on the Leeds and Liverpool Canal in Wigan. It will re-open as a visitor attraction in 2023, after years of closure. The town is also home to the Museum of Wigan Life.

=== Media, film and television ===
The Greater Manchester Film Festival was launched in 2012. It is an international film festival designed to capitalise on Greater Manchester's "huge strengths in film and television, along with its growing media presence". MediaCityUK, a host venue of the Greater Manchester Film Festival, is a 200-acre (81 ha) mixed-use property development site at Salford Quays; its principal tenants are mass media organisations such as ITV Granada and the BBC. One of Greater Manchester's most lucrative and acclaimed television exports is Coronation Street, which is a televised soap opera set in Weatherfield, a fictional borough of Greater Manchester, inspired by life in Salford. Created by Tony Warren, Coronation Street was first broadcast on 9 December 1960, making it the world's longest-running TV soap opera in production. It has been filmed in Manchester at Granada Studios since its inception, but filming is now done at a new set at MediaCityUK.

A local television station for Greater Manchester, Channel M, was launched in February 2000, carrying a wide range of local programming, including news, sport and entertainment programming. Following severe cutbacks to its local production amid heavy losses, the station ceased broadcasting in April 2012. A smaller-scale local TV station, That's Manchester, began broadcasting in May 2015.

The area has several radio stations including, BBC Radio Manchester, Hits Radio Manchester, Capital Manchester, Greatest Hits Radio Manchester & The North West, Heart North West, and Smooth North West. There are also community-based radio stations such as Greatest Hits Radio Wigan & St Helens (covering Wigan), Greatest Hits Radio Bolton & Bury (serving Bolton and Bury), Tameside Radio (serving Tameside), Your FM (for Stockport), Rochdale Valley (for Rochdale), Oldham Community Radio (for Oldham), and Salford City Radio (serving Salford).

The Manchester Evening News is a regional daily newspaper covering Greater Manchester, published every day except Sunday. It is owned by Reach plc and produced by MEN Media. It sells around 81,000 copies a day and gives away nearly 100,000, making it the market leader in Greater Manchester. The paper was first published in 1868 by Mitchell Henry as part of his parliamentary election campaign for the Manchester constituency. MEN Media "dominates Greater Manchester", reaching 7 out of 10 adults each week within the region through its portfolio of products which also includes the Oldham Advertiser, the Rochdale Observer, and the Salford Advertiser.

=== Music, theatre and performing arts ===
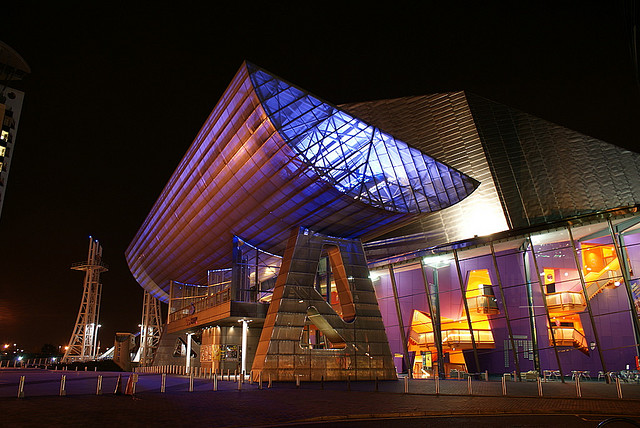
The Lowry is a combined theatre and exhibition centre at Salford Quays, and is Greater Manchester's most visited tourist attraction.

Greater Manchester has the highest number of theatre seats per head of population outside London. Most, if not all, of the larger theatres are subsidised by local authorities or the North West Regional Arts Board. The Royal Exchange Theatre formed in the 1970s out of a peripatetic group staging plays at venues such as at the University [of Manchester] Theatre and the Apollo Theatre. A season in a temporary stage in the former Royal Exchange, Manchester was followed by funding for a theatre in the round, which opened in 1976. The Lowry – Greater Manchester's most visited tourist attraction – houses two theatres, used by travelling groups in all the performing arts. The Opera House is a 1,900-seat venue hosting travelling productions, often musicals just out of the West End. Its sister venue, The Palace, hosts generally similar shows. The Oldham Playhouse, one of the older theatres in the region, helped launch the careers of Stan Laurel and Charlie Chaplin. Its productions are described by the 2007 CityLife guide as 'staunchly populist' – and popular. There are many other venues scattered throughout the county, of all types and sizes.

Greater Manchester has four professional orchestras, all based in Manchester. The Hallé is the UK's oldest symphony orchestra (and the fourth oldest in the world), supports a choir and a youth orchestra, and releases its recordings on its own record label. The Hallé is based at the Bridgewater Hall but often tours, typically giving 70 performances "at home" and 40 on tour. The BBC Philharmonic, one of five BBC orchestras, is based in MediaCityUK in Salford. It can trace its history back to the early days of radio broadcasting in 1926. The Manchester Camerata and the Northern Chamber Orchestra are smaller, though still professional, organisations. The main classical venue is the 2,341-seat Bridgewater Hall in Manchester, opened in 1996 at a cost of £42m. Manchester is also a centre for musical education, via the Royal Northern College of Music and Chetham's School of Music.

The Manchester Arena holds over 21,000 people, (Note: A three-year-long re-development of the arena started in 2022 to increase the capacity to 24,000 people) and is the largest indoor arena in the United Kingdom. It has been voted International Venue of the Year, and for several years was the most popular venue in the world. The 23,500-seat Co-op Live arena is under construction in Greater Manchester, it will open in 2023. Sports grounds in Greater Manchester, such as the City of Manchester Stadium, also host large live-music events. A £200 million flexible, large-scale cultural, arts, and exhibition space named Factory International was opened in 2023 on the former site of Granada Studios in central Manchester. It is named with reference to Factory Records, a Manchester-based independent record label, founded in 1978 by Tony Wilson and Alan Erasmus. Factory Records – which featured acts such as Joy Division, New Order, and the Happy Mondays – and The Haçienda, served as a catalyst in the late-1980s for a blending of alternative rock, psychedelic rock and electronic dance music known as Madchester. Greater Manchester continues to be associated with guitar and dance music.

== Places of interest ==
Key
	Abbey/Priory/Cathedral
Accessible open space	Accessible open space
	Amusement/Theme Park
	Castle
Country Park	Country Park
	English Heritage
	Forestry Commission
Heritage railway	Heritage railway
Historic house	Historic House
Places of Worship	Places of Worship
Museum (free) Museum	Museum (free/not free)
National Trust	National Trust
	Theatre
	Zoo

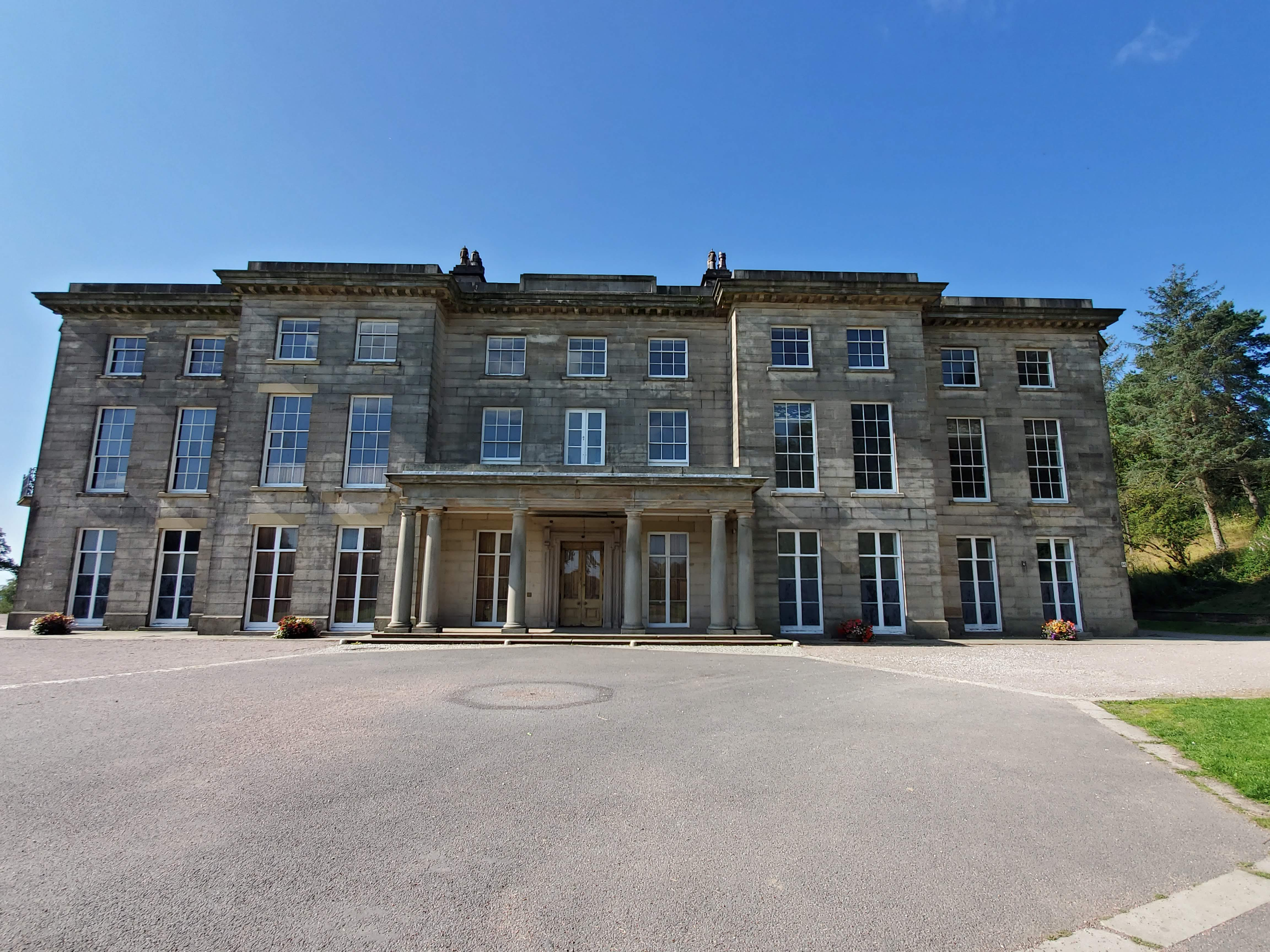
Haigh Hall

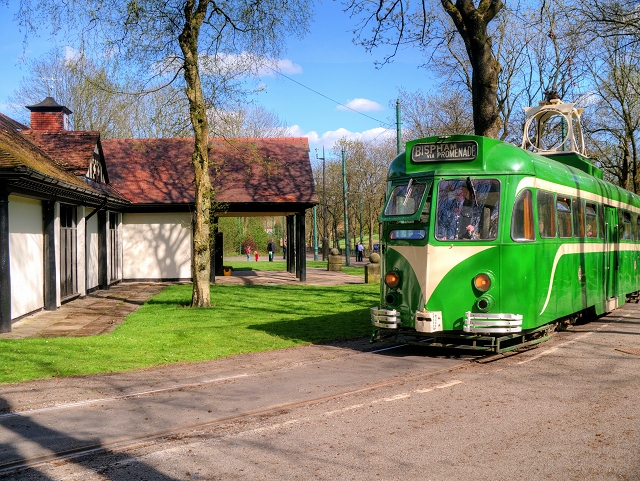
Heaton Park Tramway

- Mesnes Park, Wigan
- Alexandra Park, Oldham
- Manchester city centre
  - National Football Museum
  - Manchester Arena
  - Royal Exchange Theatre
  - Palace Theatre
  - The Corn Exchange
  - Manchester Central Convention Complex
  - Mamucium
  - Castlefield Bowl events pavilion
  - Manchester Museum
  - Science and Industry Museum
- Bolton
  - Queen's Park
  - Leverhulme Park
  - Smithills Hall
  - Hall i' th' Wood
  - Moss Bank Park and miniature railway
  - Bolton Museum, aquarium and art gallery
  - Bolton Steam Museum
- Museum of Transport, Greater Manchester
- Astley Green Colliery Museum
- Salford Museum and Art Gallery
- Philips Park Nature reserve and observatory in Prestwich
- Philips Park in east Manchester
- Mayfield Park, Manchester
- Healey Dell Viaduct and nature reserve, Rochdale
- Moses Gate Country Park, Farnworth
- Blackleach Country Park
- Jumbles Reservoir and Country Park
- Bramall Hall and grounds, Stockport
- Sale Water Park
- Abney Hall and grounds, Cheadle
- Trafford Park and Salford Quays
  - Imperial War Museum North
  - Victoria Warehouse music venue, Trafford Park
  - Chill Factore indoor ski slope, Trafford Park
  - Legoland Discovery Centre
  - The Trafford Centre, shopping centre
  - The Lowry theatre
  - Media City Footbridge
  - Salford Quays lift bridge
  - Walkden Town Centre, Shopping Centre
- Ordsall Hall, Salford
- Touchstones Rochdale, art gallery and museum
- Rochdale Pioneers Museum
- Wythenshawe Hall and the surrounding park
- Haigh Hall, woodland and miniature railway
- Heaton Park with a hall, heritage tramway, Old Manchester Town Hall ruins, reservoir and a boating lake
- Peel Monument, Ramsbottom
- Marple Aqueduct
- East Lancashire Railway, a heritage railway running between Heywood, Bury, Ramsbottom, and Rawtenstall

== See also ==
- Outline of England
- Grade I listed buildings in Greater Manchester
- Grade II* listed buildings in Greater Manchester
- List of people from Greater Manchester
- List of public art in Greater Manchester
- Proposed relocation of the Parliament of the United Kingdom
- Healthcare in Greater Manchester

== Bibliography ==
- Aspin, Chris (1981). The Cotton Industry. Shire Publications. ISBN 0-85263-545-1.
- Bayliss, Don (1996). Historical Atlas of Trafford. Don Bayliss. ISBN 0-9529300-0-5.
- Bontje, Marco; Musterd, Sako; Pelzer, Peter (2011). Inventive City-Regions. Ashgate. ISBN 978-1-4094-1772-9.
- Bowden, Andrew (2015). See You In Kirk Yetholm: Tales From The Pennine Way. Rambling Man.
- Bristow, M. Roger; Cross, Donald T. (1983). English Structure Planning: A Commentary on Procedure and Practice in the Seventies. Routledge. ISBN 0-85086-094-6.
- Carter, Charles Frederick (1962). Manchester and its Region. Manchester University Press.
- Clapson, Mark (2010). Ray Hutchison (ed.). Suburbanization in Global Society. Emerald Group. ISBN 978-0-85724-347-8.
- Clark, David M. (1973). Greater Manchester Votes: A Guide to the New Metropolitan Authorities. Redrose.
- Cooper, Glynis (2005). Salford: An Illustrated History. The Breedon Books Publishing Company. ISBN 1-85983-455-8.
- Cowhig, W. T. (1976). It Happened Round Greater Manchester; Textiles. Greater Manchester Council.
- Dawson, Alan (1992). Relative hills of Britain. Cicerone Press. ISBN 1-85284-068-4.
- Frangopulo, Nicholas Joseph (1977). Tradition in action: the historical evolution of the Greater Manchester County. EP Publishing. ISBN 0-7158-1203-3.
- Freeman, Thomas Walter; Snodgrass, Catherine P. (1959). The Conurbations of Great Britain. Manchester University Press.
- Hardy, Peter B. (1998). Butterflies of Greater Manchester. PGL Enterprises. ISBN 0-9532374-0-0.
- Hartwell, Clare (2001). Pevsner Architectural Guides: Manchester. Penguin Books. ISBN 0-14-071131-7.
- Hartwell, Clare; Hyde, Matthew; Pevsner, Nikolaus (2004). Lancashire : Manchester and the South-East. The buildings of England. Yale University Press. ISBN 0-300-10583-5.
- Holland, Philip; Spence, Ian; Sutton, Trevor (1984). Breeding Birds in Greater Manchester. Manchester Ornithological Society. ISBN 978-0-9509505-0-1.
- Hyde, M.; O'Rourke, A.; Portland, P. (2004). Around the M60: Manchester's Orbital Motorway. AMCD. ISBN 1-897762-30-5.
- Kellie, Euan (2010). Rebuilding Manchester. Derby: Derby Books. ISBN 978-1-85983-786-3.
- Kidd, Alan (2006). Manchester: A History. Carnegie Publishing. ISBN 1-85936-128-5.
- Little, Daran (1995). The Coronation Street Story. Boxtree. ISBN 978-1-85283-464-7.
- Little, Daran (2000). 40 Years of Coronation Street. Andre Deutsch. ISBN 978-0-233-99806-0.
- Matthews, Peter, ed. (1992). The Guinness Book of Records 1993. Guinness World Records Limited. ISBN 0-85112-978-1.
- McNeil, Robina; Nevell, Michael (2000). A Guide to the Industrial Archaeology of Greater Manchester. Association for Industrial Archaeology. ISBN 0-9528930-3-7.
- Murray, Braham (2007). The worst it can be is a disaster. Methuen Drama, A & C Black Publishers. ISBN 978-0-7136-8490-2.
- Nevell, Mike; Redhead, Norman, eds. (2005). Mellor: Living on the Edge. A Regional Study of an Iron Age and Romano-British Upland Settlement. University of Manchester Archaeological Unit, Greater Manchester Archaeological Unit, and the Mellor Archaeological Trust. ISBN 0-9527813-6-0.
- Parkinson-Bailey, John J (2000). Manchester: an Architectural History. Manchester University Press. ISBN 0-7190-5606-3.
- Ramsden, Caroline (1966). Farewell Manchester: history of Manchester Racecourse. J A Allen & Co.
- Ravetz, Joe (2000). City-Region 2020. Earthscan. ISBN 978-1-85383-606-0.
- Redcliffe-Maud, John; Wood, Bruce (1975). English local government reformed. OUP. ISBN 0-19-885091-3.
- Redcliffe-Maud, John (June 1969). Royal Commission on Local Government in England 1966–1969, Volume I: Report (Cmnd. 4040). HMSO.
- Redhead, Brian (1993). Manchester: a Celebration. Andre Deutsch Ltd. ISBN 0-233-98816-5.
- Roberts, Peter; Thomas, Kevin; Williams, Gwyndaf (2014). Metropolitan Planning in Britain: A Comparative Study. Routledge. ISBN 9781136035845.
- Rochdale Metropolitan Borough Council. Metropolitan Rochdale Official Guide. Ed. J. Burrow & Co. Ltd.
- Schofield, Jonathan (2003). City Life: Manchester the Complete Guide. City Life. ISBN 978-0-9544460-0-0.
- Schofield, Jonathan (2007). Manchester: the complete guide 2007. City Life.
- Taylor, Ian; Evans, Karen; Fraser, Penny (1996). A Tale of Two Cities: Global Change, Local Feeling, and Everyday Life in the North of England: a Study in Manchester and Sheffield. Routledge. ISBN 978-0-415-13828-4.
- Wannop, Urlan (2002). Regional Imperative: Regional Planning and Governance in Britain, Europe and the United States. Routledge. ISBN 978-0-11-702368-0.
- Wilson, David; Game, Chris (2002). Local Government in the United Kingdom (3rd ed.). Palgrave MacMillan. ISBN 978-0-333-94859-0.
