= SELNEC =

SELNEC was an acronym for "South East Lancashire North East Cheshire". It may refer to:

- Greater Manchester, a metropolitan county of North West England
- SELNEC Passenger Transport Executive, from 1969 until renamed Greater Manchester Passenger Transport Executive in 1974
