= United City =

United City is a group of businesses based within Greater Manchester, England, who supported proposals for congestion charging in Greater Manchester via the Greater Manchester Transport Innovation Fund bid for £3 billion. The bid was rejected by a referendum on 12 December 2008. Had the proposal been passed, it would have been the United Kingdom's largest public transport investment in history outside London. United City had over 226 registered companies as of 19 November 2008.

== Background and history ==
5 June 2008
United City went public with their plans and to support the bid for the £3 billion Transport Innovation Fund (TIF). Since then they have been gathering support for the bid and they have been putting their views across to make improvements. They class themselves as an independent alliance.

18 June 2008
They announced C-charge demands and that the group had grown to over 50 members in a number of days.

30 June 2008
United City announced that the group had grown to 62 members and included Infinity Asset Management, a private equity firm.

7 July 2008
The group said the £2.7bn package could be worth up to £10bn ($20bn US dollars) to the local economy.

14 July 2008
United City announced that more members had joined include many major hotels and major leisure groups within Manchester. The group had grown to over 75 members.

24 July 2008
United City announced that PZ Cussons along with other major businesses where backing the bid. The group had grown to 83 members by this date.

30 July 2008
The Department for Transport released figures for 2007 showed that average traffic speeds during the morning rush hour on the major arterial routes around Greater Manchester are the slowest in the country. United City say these figures support the bid for the transport fund. The group had grown to over 90 members by this date.

4 August 2008
Dr Leif Jerram, lecturer in urban history at the University of Manchester released a research paper backing the bid after being approached by United City.

9 August 2008
Two Major companies including British Airways Plc and Manchester Airport along with Alpha Airports Group Plc, SSP UK Air Ltd and VLM Airlines joined United City. The 5 companies employ over 4,000 people at the airport. Andrew Cornish, Manchester Airport’s managing director, was quoted saying: “Improving the way our passengers and staff access the airport is a key objective of our master plan to 2030 and TIF would enable us to reach our targets within the next five years. The airport is critical to the economic and social fabric of the region. We consider TIF fundamental to the region because it unlocks the potential for a world-class public transport system.” The group had reached 107 members by this date.

1 October 2008
According to a new research paper by tourist body Visit Manchester, they have called for the introduction of an Oyster Style Ticketing system into Manchester. The report argues that the TIF even with the congestion charge would have a net benefit to Visitors to the City. Visit Manchester have since joined UnitedCity.

13 October 2008
Manchester Metropolitan University has joined United City and spoken in favour of the TIF bid for £3 Billion of investment into the local transport system. With 34,000 students and 4,400 staff, they have it clear the investment is welcome along with other organisations along the Oxford Road corridor. United City had grown to over 160 members by this date.

18 November 2008
Massive Companies have joined United Citys campaign for Investment into Greater Manchester. Co-op, Norwich Union, Jamie Oliver's Fresh Retail Ventures and TUC have all joined supporting backing the bid. TUC have over 7 Million members throughout the UK. United City had grown to over 226 members by this date.

=== Aim, conditions and demands ===
Two quotes from United City explained their aims. 'A statement from United City said it would “represent all forward-thinking companies and organisations which understand that the economic future of Greater Manchester depends on a sustainable road and public transport system and that a world-class integrated network will hugely improve the city region's competitive advantage in the global marketplace.” '

'Ken Knott, chief executive of Ask Developments, said: "United City wants to win (Greater Manchester’s) bid for a world-class public transport network for a world-class city region. We agree with the public authorities that doing nothing is not an option.” '

Their demands were :-

- A cap of only one charge for business vehicles passing through a charging ring more than once during the charging periods. This will help businesses which, for example, have to make peak-time deliveries across the M60 and inner charging rings. This has been met
- An exemption for Trafford Park from any charge until the Metrolink line is completed. A 50% discount is currently purposed
- An exemption for motorcycles. This has been met
- All excess income from congestion charging to be ring-fenced wholly for spending on public transport in Greater Manchester. This has been met

These were in addition to the following conditions set down by United City :-

- The great majority of the public transport improvements outlined within the TIF proposals must be in place before a congestion charge is introduced. 80% has promised to be in place
- The congestion charge must only be active when congestion causes the economy the greatest cost (during the early morning and evening rush hours). The charge will only be at peak times on weekdays
- The income from congestion charging is ring-fenced to service only repayments for the capital loan from central government, for investment in and support of public transport in Greater Manchester. This has been met
- An independent individual or body must be in place to oversee the public transport investment and the implementation of the congestion charge.

== See also ==
- List of companies based in Greater Manchester
