= Greater Manchester congestion charge =

Transport proposal in Manchester, England

The Greater Manchester congestion charge was part of a bid to the government's Transport Innovation Fund for a £3-billion package of transport funding and the introduction of a road congestion charge for Greater Manchester, a metropolitan county in North West England. In 2008, two cordons were proposed—the outer encircling the main urban core of the Greater Manchester Urban Area and the inner covered Manchester city centre. The Greater Manchester Transport Innovation Fund was rejected by a referendum on 12 December 2008.

The proposed charge was to help pay for improvements in public transport, with £3 billion in the form of a grant and loan, in particular for the Manchester Metrolink expansion, and to reduce congestion in Greater Manchester.

== Proposed charge ==
The proposal was part of a bid to the Government's Transport Innovation Fund for a £2.7 billion package of transport funding and the introduction of a road congestion charging system. A key aspect of the proposed Manchester Congestion Charge was the setting up of the system, which will be paid for (£318 million) with part of the £2.7 billion fund from the TIF, £1.151 billion of which would have been in the form of a loan; the revenue from the charging scheme would have been used to repay the loan over a 30-year period.

It was proposed that vehicles entering the area bounded by the M60 motorway would be charged £2.00 in the morning peak, with a further £1.00 for those entering the inner cordon, roughly corresponding to the Manchester Inner Ring Road. In the evening, a further £1.00 would have been charged on exit of each cordon. The figures quoted by the Association of Greater Manchester Authorities (AGMA) and Greater Manchester Passenger Transport Executive were at 2007 prices. By 2013 AGMA estimated that the cost of crossing both cordons at charging times would be £6

The area covered by the charge would have covered about 80 square miles (210 km^{2}).

The original zone covered by the London congestion charge was about eight square miles, Singapore two square miles and Stockholm 18 square miles, but the scheme differed from London in that charges would have been lower and the charging hours much shorter. Inbound charges would have applied between 0700 and 0930, outbound ones between 1600 and 1830. There was to be no charge during the middle of the day, later in the evening, at the weekend or for journeys against the peak flow: leaving the city in the morning or entering it in the evening.

Payment of the charge would be via a pre-pay "tag and beacon" system. Credit was to be automatically deducted from a driver's account as they passed each of the cordons. Occasional visitors to Manchester without a pre-pay tag would have been able to pay via call centre or internet, but there would have been a surcharge. The scheme was planned to be up and running by mid-2013, by which time it was anticipated that 80% of the public transport improvements would have been completed.

Motorcycles, black taxis and private hire cars would not have had to pay the charge. It was proposed that the Manchester scheme would charge motorcycles at a lower rate than cars, as they do not contribute to congestion to the same extent as cars but this was later dropped.

== Proposed public transport improvements ==
A number of specific projects would be funded from the scheme, including extensions of the Manchester Metrolink to Oldham town centre, Rochdale town centre, East Didsbury, Ashton-under-Lyne, the Trafford Centre and Manchester Airport. A second line through the city centre would also be built. In total, 35 kilometres (22 mi) of new lines were planned. A bus rapid transit system was proposed along the Oxford Road corridor and between the city centre and Bolton and Leigh. A fleet of American-style yellow school buses were mooted. More than 30 rail stations would be upgraded, in addition to extra carriages for the busiest rail services. the Greater Manchester Passenger Transport Executive also planned to introduce a smartcard ticketing system, similar to London's Oyster card. Eight new transport interchanges were to be built across Greater Manchester. The government claimed that most, if not all, of these improvements were to be in place before the congestion charge was imposed.

== Government financial support ==
In a speech to the House of Commons on Monday 9 June 2008, Minister for Transport Ruth Kelly gave Manchester's TIF bid the government's approval. She announced that the DfT would be giving Manchester £1.441 billion, £300 million more than AGMA had requested.

== Reaction ==
=== Public ===
A group of over 160 Manchester-based businesses calling themselves United City fully supported the Transport Innovation Fund (TIF) bid. A group of over 279 businesses, the Greater Manchester Momentum Group, opposed the plans.

On 24 October the Stop the Charge Coalition was formed, comprising a cross party alliance of seven local MPs and the leaders of the three councils opposed to the plans.

The Manchester Evening News newspaper conducted a telephone survey to gauge public support for a congestion charging scheme. The survey posed several questions, two of which directly asked if respondents were in favour of congestion charging. The results were mixed, with around two thirds of respondents thinking that congestion charging was not "a good idea" but a slim majority in favour of congestion charging in Manchester as part of the proposed public transport improvement scheme in Manchester's Transport Innovation Fund bid.

- "Do you think congestion charging is a good idea": Yes – 36%; No – 64%
- "Is congestion charging a price worth paying to get £3bn Government cash to improve public transport in the region – including the expansion of the Metrolink to Ashton-under-Lyne, Oldham and Rochdale, as well as South Manchester and Manchester Airport?": Yes – 55%; No – 44%

A "Green Survey" conducted by the same news paper month later shows that two thirds of the region back the congestion charge.

One side is headed by a coalition of campaign groups known as Clean Air Now (CAN), while the other side is headed by campaign group known as Manchester Against Road Tolls (MART).

MART stated that it did not believe the public was consulted properly and that the information provided by supporters of the charge was biased and insufficient. MART started a legal petition calling for a referendum on a directly elected mayor who would lead Bury council and be able to withdraw Bury's support from the scheme. This required 7,099 people or 5% of the Bury electorate to sign the petition. Some councillors for Bury have called for a referendum directly on the congestion charge. MART has launched similar petitions in the other seven districts of Greater Manchester that support the TiF bid.

MART has established a branch in Tameside after gauging the level of opposition to the scheme in the area through the online petition.

In July 2008, the Association of Greater Manchester Authorities agreed unanimously to the proposed Transport Improvements, in conjunction with a Congestion Charge, to be submitted to a referendum of the residents of Greater Manchester; the vote itself to be managed by the Electoral Reform Society. Only if there is a majority in favour of the proposals in seven out of the ten boroughs, would the proposals go forwards.

=== Political ===
The proposals were voted on at a meeting of the Association of Greater Manchester Authorities on 27 July 2007 in Dukinfield, Tameside.

AGMA took only 45 minutes to vote to proceed with the TIF proposals by eight votes to two, with Stockport and Trafford borough councils the only opponents. Before the meeting, Stockport Metropolitan Borough Council and Trafford Metropolitan Borough Council had held their own consultations to gauge public support. After the Stockport survey found that 67% of residents and 78% of businesses in the borough did not support the proposed road charges it announced on 26 July 2007 that it would be voting no at the meeting of AGMA the following day. Trafford announced on 23 July 2007 that it would vote against the congestion charging proposals. On 12 December 2007, Bury Metropolitan Borough Council voted to withdraw its support for the congestion charge, bringing the numbers to seven for, three against. In January 2008 seven of the local authorities in Greater Manchester supported the scheme.

Labour was strongly in favour of the congestion charge, having proposed the idea through the Greater Manchester Passenger Transport Executive. It faced a mixed reaction from the Liberal Democrats with Stockport Metropolitan Borough Council (which was controlled by the Liberal Democrats) rejecting the Manchester Congestion Charge, yet many Manchester City Liberal Democrats spoke out in favour of the congestion charge, and Liberal Democrat controlled Rochdale Metropolitan Borough Council voted in favour. The only party to reject the congestion charge was the Conservatives, who controlled Trafford Metropolitan Borough Council.

In the 2008 United Kingdom local elections Roger Jones, the Labour chairman of the Greater Manchester Passenger Transport Executive, was pushed into third place in Irlam, Salford. His seat was won by the Community Action Party, which ran a campaign based on opposition to the £5 daily peak period congestion charge that was proposed by Jones.

=== Regional ballot results ===
In a public referendum the results were split down through each of the 10 local councils involved. The referendum needed to gain the support of 8 council areas to be passed. In the end, each of the local areas rejected the proposals by large majorities.

Votes in response to the Manchester Congestion Charge Referendum
Region	Turnout (%)	Yes	No	Yes (%)	No (%)
Bolton	48.8	20,529	79,910	21	79
Bury	57.4	16,563	64,001	21	79
Rochdale	50.8	17,333	68,884	20	80
Oldham	54.4	17,571	68,884	20	80
Wigan	45.3	27,810	78,565	26	74
Salford	57.0	14,603	79,326	16	84
Manchester	46.1	43,593	113,064	28	72
Tameside	60.7	16,323	83,105	17	83
Trafford	63.6	20,445	83,568	20	80
Stockport	59.0	24,090	103,706	19	81
TOTAL	53.2	218,860	812,815	21.2	78.8
Source: Manchester Evening News C-Charge Results

As a result of this public response, the Congestion Charge proposal for Manchester was dropped.

== Later proposals ==
In May 2017, Transport for Greater Manchester said that it was considering bringing in a revenue neutral £7.50 daily charge for drivers of polluting vehicles as part of plans for Clean Air Zones. However Andy Burnham, Mayor of Greater Manchester, said that he would not introduce such a charge, although legal responsibility lies with councils rather than the Mayor. In September 2018, the leaders of the local councils in Greater Manchester met to discuss charging the most polluting vehicles in a bid to improve the poor air quality in Manchester, which is responsible for around 1,000 premature deaths a year. Around 20% of private cars in the region, mostly pre-2015 diesels, and 70% of buses would be hit by the charge. The council leaders presented their plans to the Department of Environment, Food and Rural Affairs by the end of January 2019 and must implement a Clean Air Zone unless a suitable alternative compliance strategy can be identified. To meet the statutory requirements other cities such as Birmingham and Leeds have already decided to introduce Clean Air Zones while London is expanding its existing zones operating hours to 24 hours per day.

== See also ==
- Congestion pricing
- Road pricing
