= Greater Manchester Passenger Transport Executive =

Public transport authority in England

- The GMPTE logo in use until March 2011

- Area of responsibility within England
- Abbreviation: GMPTE
- Predecessor: SELNEC, Greater Manchester Transport
- Successor: Transport for Greater Manchester
- Dissolved: 2011
- Type: Passenger transport executive
- Legal status: Defunct
- Purpose: Transport authority
- Region served: Greater Manchester
- Website: gmpte.com

Greater Manchester Passenger Transport Executive (GMPTE) was the public body responsible for public transport in Greater Manchester between 1974 and 2011, when it became part of Transport for Greater Manchester.

== SELNEC PTE ==
GMPTE was originally formed in 1969 as SELNEC PTE

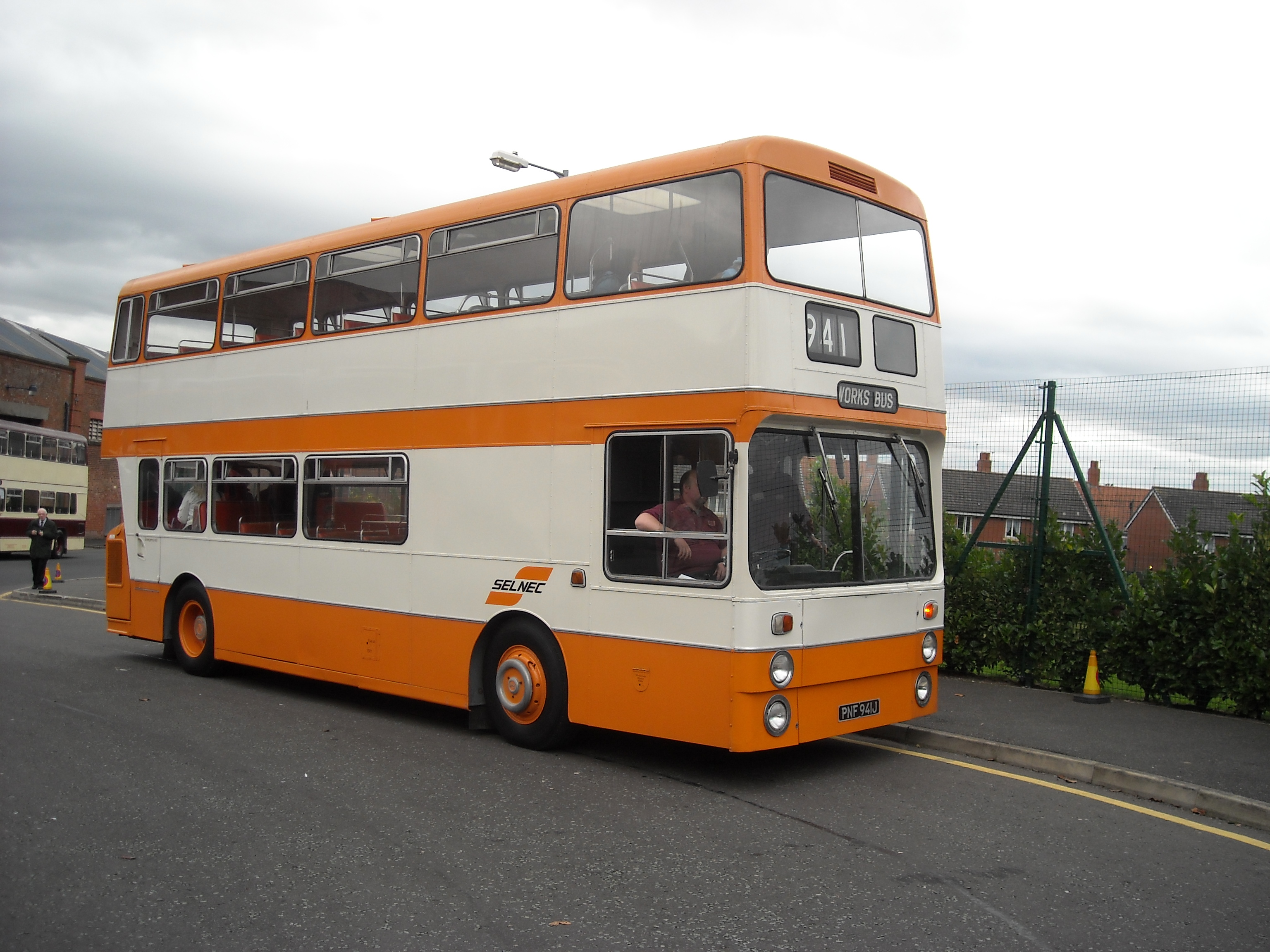
A preserved SELNEC-branded Leyland Atlantean bus at the Manchester Museum of Transport

Until 1969, the conurbation surrounding Manchester was divided between the two administrative counties of Lancashire and Cheshire and a number of county boroughs, such as Manchester, Salford, Stockport or Bolton. To comply with the Transport Act 1968, on 1 April 1969, the SELNEC Passenger Transport Executive was formed. SELNEC stood for South East Lancashire North East Cheshire, a joint authority of the various local councils.

SELNEC divisional logos

From 1 November 1969, the PTE took over the bus fleets of 11 municipalities. Operationally, the organisation was split into three divisional areas, Northern, Central, and Southern:

=== Northern ===
- Bolton Corporation (249 vehicles)
- Bury Corporation (96 vehicles)
- Leigh Corporation (57 vehicles)
- Ramsbottom Urban District Council (12 vehicles)
- Rochdale Corporation (130 vehicles)

=== Central ===
- Manchester Corporation (1,250 vehicles)
- Salford Corporation (271 vehicles)

=== Southern ===
- Ashton-under-Lyne Corporation (60 vehicles)
- Oldham Corporation (180 vehicles)
- Stockport Corporation (145 vehicles)
- Stalybridge, Hyde, Mossley & Dukinfield Transport & Electricity Board (91 vehicles)

SELNEC branded its fleet with its corporate orange and white livery and the 'S' logo. The 'S' logo was coloured differently in each division: magenta for Northern, blue for Central and green for Southern. For corporate operations, the parcel operations (inherited from Manchester), and the coaching fleet, the 'S' logo was in orange

In the early 1970s, SELNEC began to promote a project to construct an underground railway beneath central Manchester, the Picc-Vic tunnel. The scheme aimed to link the two main railway stations, Piccadilly and Victoria with a tunnel. The project was eventually cancelled on grounds of cost.

On 1 January 1972, SELNEC PTE acquired most of National Bus Company's North Western Road Car subsidiary with buses, services and depots in Altrincham, Glossop, Oldham, Stockport and Urmston. The corporate orange and white livery was applied, with the 'S' logo in brown and the name "Cheshire". (Most of the NWRCC operations bought by SELNEC were in the old county of Cheshire).

== 1974: Replacement by Greater Manchester PTE ==
The original Greater Manchester Transport double 'M' logo from 1974

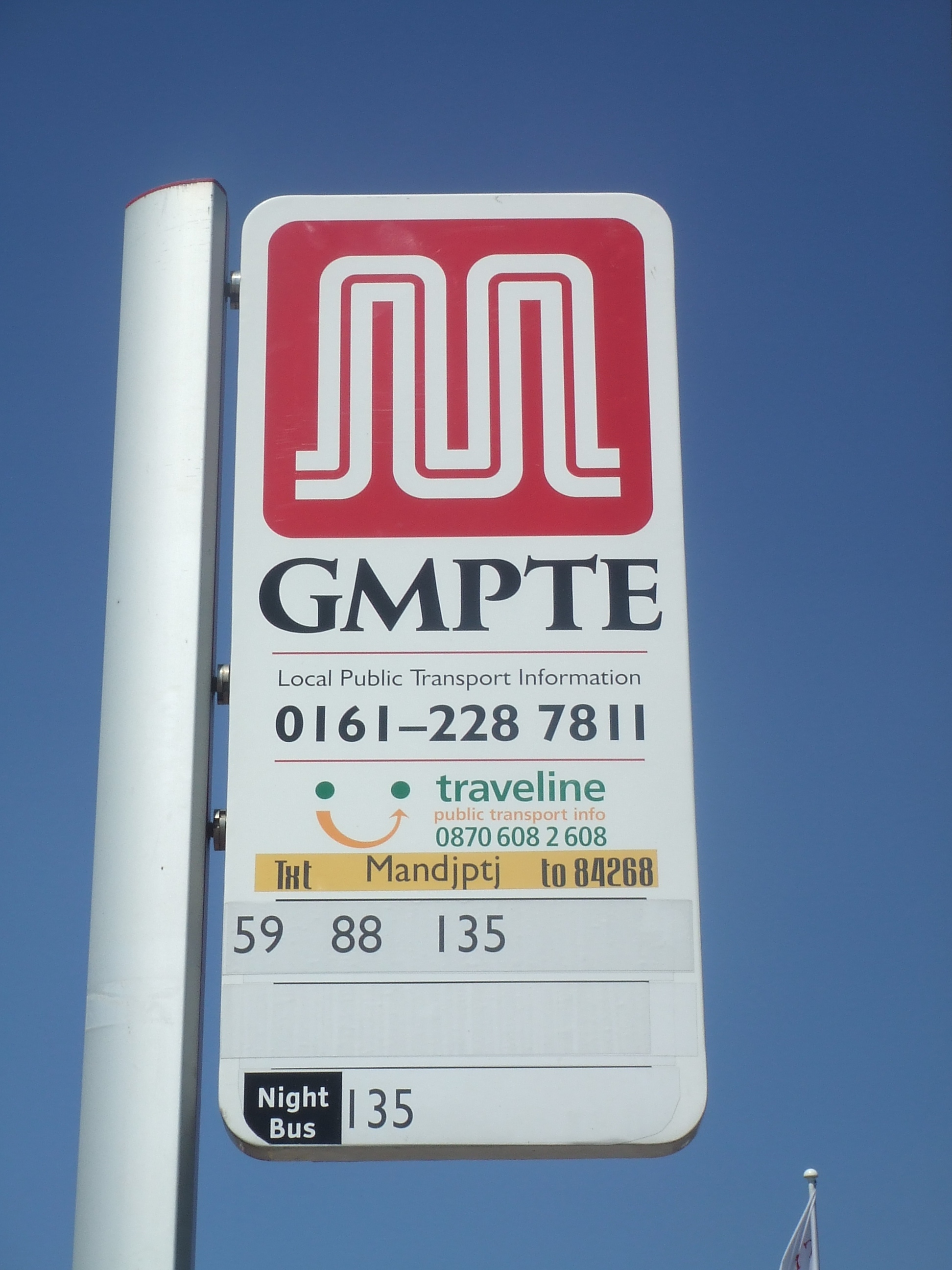
A GMPTE bus stop in 2006 displaying the double 'M' logo

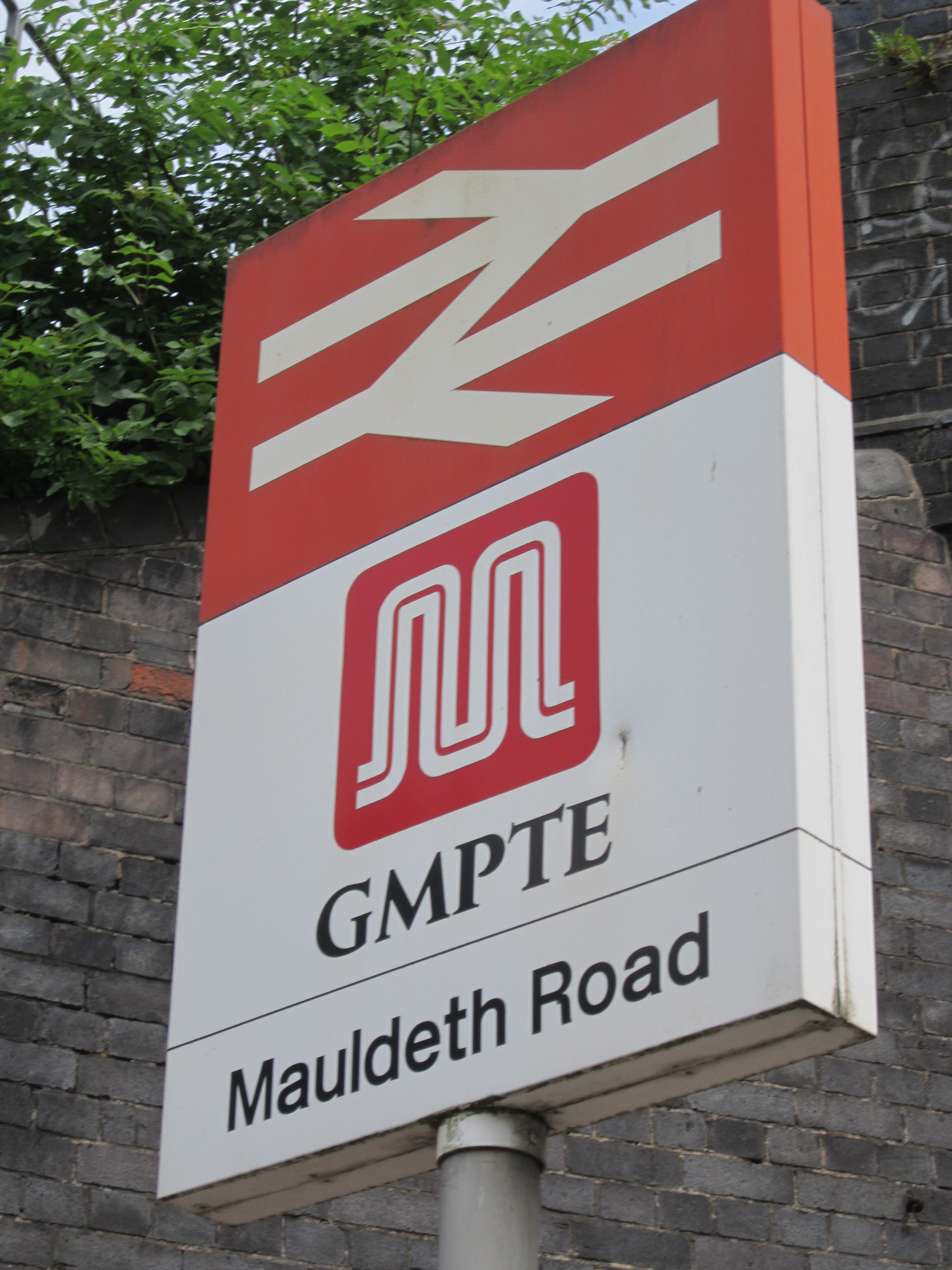
A GMPTE branded signpost at Mauldeth Road railway station in 2013

When the metropolitan county of Greater Manchester was created on 1 April 1974 the executive was replaced by GMPTE, with the Greater Manchester County Council replacing the joint transport authority. The PTE also acquired the bus operations of Wigan Corporation with 130 vehicles. Further expansion saw the acquisition of Warburton's Coaches in November 1975 and Lancashire United Transport and Godfrey Abbot in January 1976.

The public branding applied to buses and signage used the shorter name Greater Manchester Transport, displayed in upper and lower case Helvetica next to a distinctive orange double 'M' logo. The logo, first seen around 1974, is still in use today on bus stops and transport information literature, but is being gradually replaced on the former across Greater Manchester by rebranded bus stop flags displaying the new Transport for Greater Manchester logo.

To add to printed material and logos etched in glass on the side of bus shelters, GMPTE began a programme of adding their 'double M' logo to 101 railway station nameboards, train rolling stock livery, bus sides and some 'totem' pole signs outside rail stations in the area during the 1990s. This idea was later extended to a full re-design of the bus stop flag in 2000, (used first on primary bus routes, now extended to the entire GMPTE area) resulting in a unified corporate appearance containing the 'double M' logo on bus, train and tram stops.

The PTE sponsored several new railway stations on existing lines in the 1970s and 1980s including Flowery Field, Godley, Hag Fold and Ryder Brow.

== 1980s: Deregulation and privatisation of bus services ==
Following the abolition of the Greater Manchester County Council in 1986, a new Passenger Transport Authority was created to administer the GMPTE, made up of councillors from the Greater Manchester district councils.

In the same year, in order to prepare for bus deregulation, the PTE's bus operations passed to Greater Manchester Buses Limited (trading as GM Buses) in October 1986. The company was owned at "arm's length" by the PTE, and had to compete in the deregulated market. In preparation for privatisation, the company was split into GM Buses North and GM Buses South on 31 December 1993. Both companies were sold to their managements on 31 March 1994, and sold on to major groups in 1996: GM Buses South to Stagecoach in February, GM Buses North to FirstBus in March.

== 21st century ==
=== Transport Innovation Fund ===
GMPTE and the GMPTA worked with the Association of Greater Manchester Authorities to produce a bid for monies from the Transport Innovation Fund. Within the bid were proposals to introduce Congestion charging in Greater Manchester. They claimed the Greater Manchester Transport Innovation Fund would have significantly improve public transport in the area funded by charging motorists entering the city at peak times. A consultation document was sent out to residents during July 2008. In December 2008, a local referendum voted no to the proposals.

=== Executive pay ===
In February 2011, the Daily Telegraph reported that David Leather, chief executive of the Passenger Transport Executive, was being paid £45,000 a month, and Bob Morris, interim chief operating officer, was getting a six-figure salary. Because they were seconded staff, rather than being employees, they were supposedly not covered by the government demand that the pay of any public-sector employee earning more than the Prime Minister should be disclosed.
