= Greater Manchester Transport Innovation Fund =

Failed transport proposal in England

The GM TiF logo

The Greater Manchester Transport Innovation Fund was a failed bid by the Greater Manchester Passenger Transport Authority (GMPTA) and Association of Greater Manchester Authorities (AGMA) to secure £1.5 billion from the Transport Innovation Fund (TIF), a major public transport funding mechanism in England, for the metropolitan county of Greater Manchester. There would have been an additional £1.2 billion borrowed and paid back through a mixture of public transport revenues and weekday, peak-time only Greater Manchester congestion charge.

If approved, the funds would have been spent on modernising Greater Manchester's transport network, with large-scale extensions of the Manchester Metrolink system, as well as increased bus and rail services, investment in existing stations and improvements to cycling and road networks. Other changes would have been the introduction of the Readycard, an Integrated Transport Smartcard similar to the Oyster card used in Greater London.

AGMA decided to hold a referendum in Greater Manchester so that its electorate could express their approval or rejection of the proposals. The referendum, a postal vote, began in late November and closed on 11 December 2008. The results were announced on 12 December, showing that the majority of voters in all ten boroughs rejected the proposals.

== History ==
On 25 May 2007 the Association of Greater Manchester Authorities (AGMA) and GMPTA issued a joint news release stating their intention to 'seek views' on a possible Transport Innovation Fund (TiF) bid to the government for a £3bn package of transport funding along with the introduction of a congestion charging system.

Four tests were set by AGMA for a suitable bid:

- 80% of the investment programme would be in place before congestion charging commenced, with 100% of the improvements completed in the subsequent two-year period.
- The proposal would support competition and address social inclusion across Greater Manchester
- That the bid be acceptable to both the public and the business community
- That the congestion charge addressed areas where congestion was most obvious, and that it would be simple and efficient

Following a consultation period involving the use of polls, focus groups, and feedback, on 27 July 2007 AGMA agreed to submit the bid. On 9 June 2008 Ruth Kelly, the Secretary of State for Transport, announced that Greater Manchester's TiF bid had been approved by the Department for Transport. A 14-week consultation on the proposal began on 5 July 2008, and on 24 July 2008 a decision was made to allow a referendum to decide upon the future of the scheme. At a meeting of the AGMA in Bolton on 29 August 2008, it was decided that a referendum would be held on 11 December 2008. It was the first time that the population of Greater Manchester has voted in a referendum since 1975 when the UK voted to stay in the European Union. The returning officer was Sir Neil McIntosh. The referendum is to be administered by the Electoral Reform Society. Although the local authorities opted into the referendum, they were not obliged to take part as it is a "local poll" governed by Section 116 of the Local Government Act 2003. To ensure the success of the bid, 50.1% of all votes in seven out of the ten Greater Manchester authorities would need to be 'for' the scheme. From the total vote (each region has 10% of the total) a minimum vote of 35.07% 'for' spread evenly over seven areas is required.

=== Funding ===
The proposed funding would have been in two parts: £1.441bn in the form of a grant from Central Government, and £1.150bn as a loan to be repaid over a period of 30 years with the profit generated by both the public transport system and the Congestion Charge, in addition £300m would have been loaned to directly set up and administer the congestion charging system. The funding would be spent on the proposed improvements, and the cost of setting up the system. Once the loan had been repaid, the profits from the congestion charge would be used to fund future investment in Greater Manchester's transport system.

== Investment ==
=== Buses ===
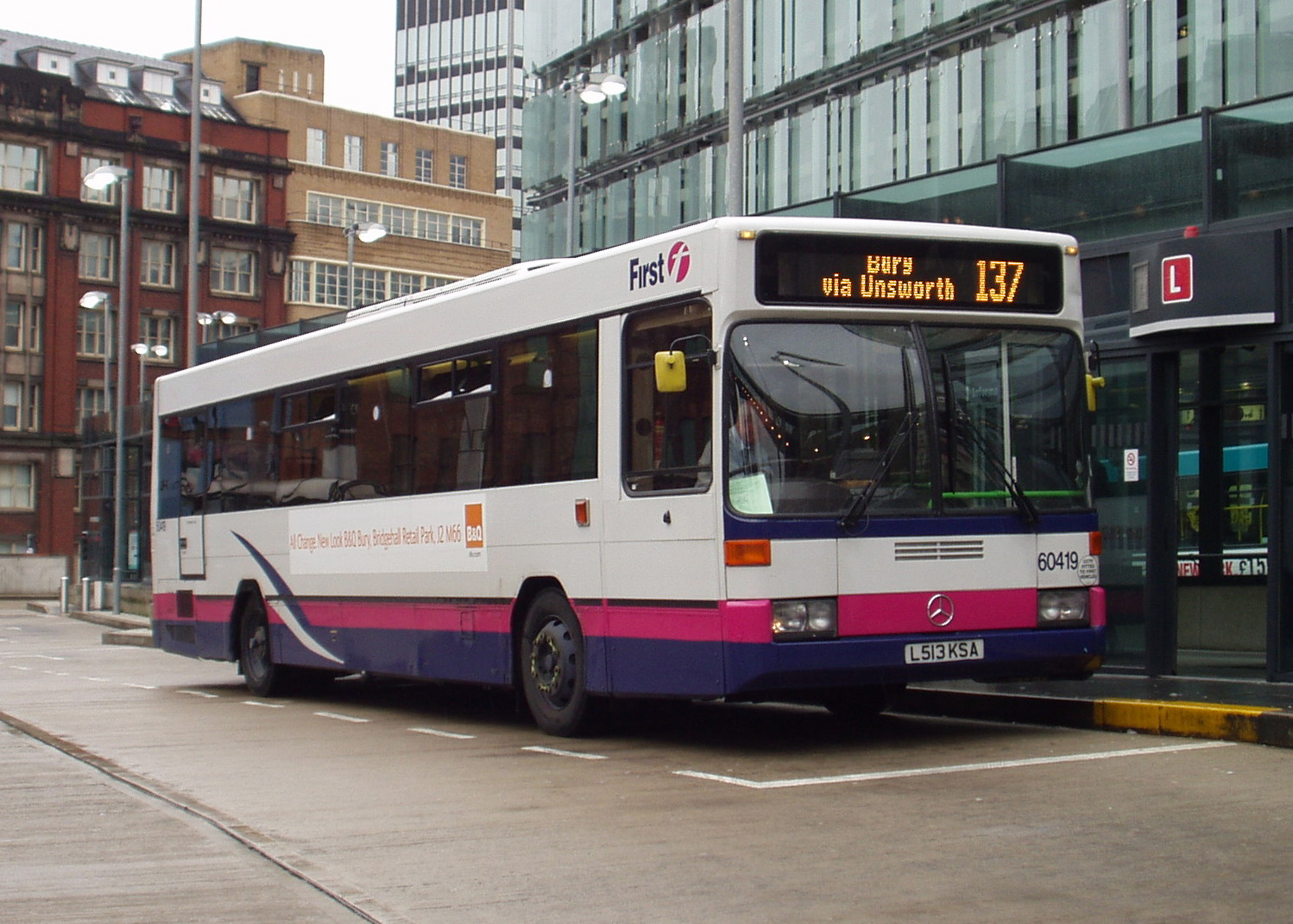
First Greater Manchester bus at Shudehill Interchange, Manchester

Privately operated bus services would have gained a large amount of investment from the fund. The aim of the TiF was to improve reliability, create better local routes and better access, and to make the services easier to use. The proposals included:

- Improving the frequency of bus services at all times of day, including the early morning and late evening
- Expanding the service network and making bus coverage in Greater Manchester more comprehensive
- Introducing more modern and comfortable buses (all of which would have low floors for ease of access)
- Providing new "feeder" links with railway stations and Metrolink stops
- Improving fare-collection systems, encouraging the use of season tickets and the introduction of a smartcard scheme
- Introducing "bus priority" corridors to give buses more road space.

At a local level, the plan presumed that 90% of the population of Greater Manchester should live within a five-minute walk of a bus service meeting the following criteria:

- At least a 20-minute frequency on weekdays
- At least a 30-minute frequency on weekday evenings and at weekends.

Access improvements would have included a new real-time customer information system: passengers would be able to monitor the location of buses, and their expected time of arrival, by checking online or by using a mobile phone, with some stops including screens displaying such information. Closed-circuit television at stops and on buses would be installed to help improve security. New routes were proposed, including circular routes serving various inner suburbs and connecting them with popular districts such as Trafford Park and Salford Quays; outer circular services travelling across Greater Manchester between outlying areas transport interchanges and linking transport corridors in addition to the existing radial services terminating in Manchester city centre; and a high-speed Bus Rapid Transit (BRT) service between Leigh, Salford, and Manchester, travelling mostly on new bus corridors.

==== Yellow school buses ====
As of 2008 there were 36 dedicated school buses operating in Greater Manchester. The Transport Innovation Fund would have increased the fleet in two stages. Funding had already been secured for 120 new school buses (provided regardless of the outcome of the public vote on the proposals), 70 of which were to be used on new routes, and 50 to replace the buses then in use on existing routes. A further 170 were planned to be introduced over the next decade utilising Tif funding.

=== Railways ===
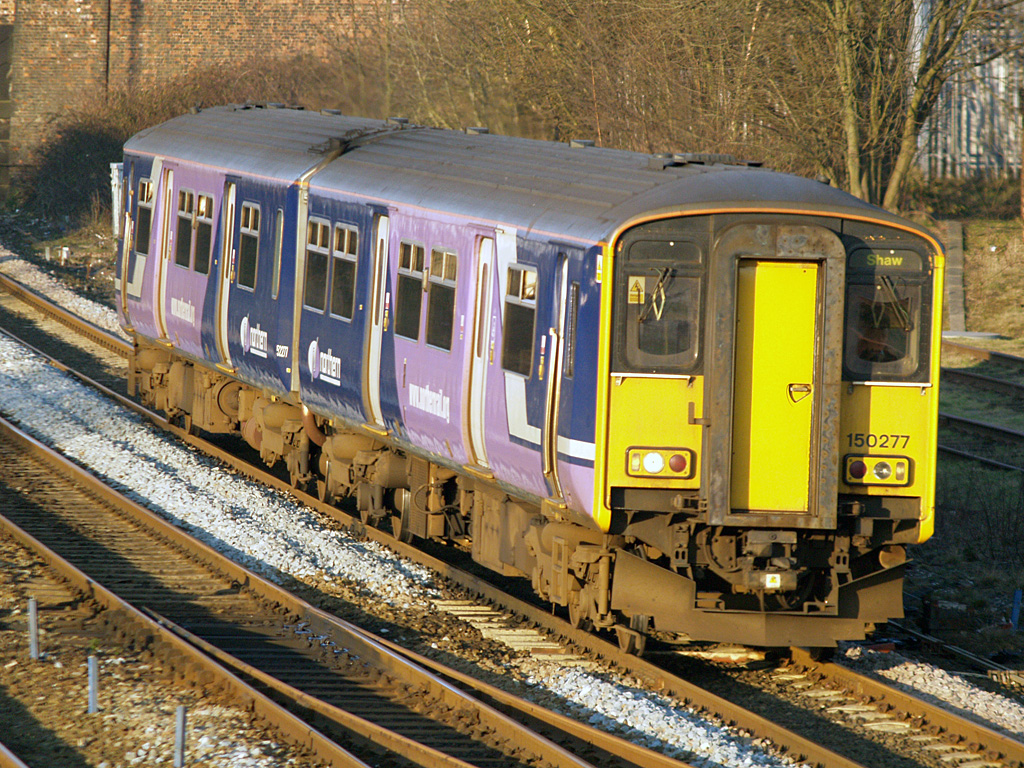
A Northern Rail service near Castleton in 2008

Northern Trains is responsible for running local rail services and for operating most railway stations in Greater Manchester. The TiF included plans for improving the rail network in the area. Investment in new and longer trains would increase peak-time capacity by 2,950 seats across Greater Manchester; this would be in addition to 4,100 peak-time seats the government had promised to fund regardless of whether the TiF proceeded. Extra platforms or extensions to existing platforms could be built at some stations to accommodate longer trains. Security improvements would include the provision of closed-circuit television at stations, covering platforms, waiting areas and car parks. In order to encourage passengers to cycle to stations, 2,500 secure bicycle stands are planned. Connections between different modes of transport would be improved with interchange facilities (with buses and Metrolink services where applicable) at several locations in Manchester city centre, Salford, Altrincham, Ashton-under-Lyne, Bolton, Eccles, Stockport and Wigan. New or enlarged park and ride facilities were proposed at Cheadle Hulme, Horwich Parkway, Hazel Grove, Heald Green, Mills Hill, Rochdale, Romiley and Stalybridge railway stations. As with the proposed improvements to the bus network, customer information screens would have been provided at all stations; real-time updates would be available online and via a text message service. The proposed smartcard system would be valid on trains in the Greater Manchester area as well as on buses and trams.

=== Metrolink ===
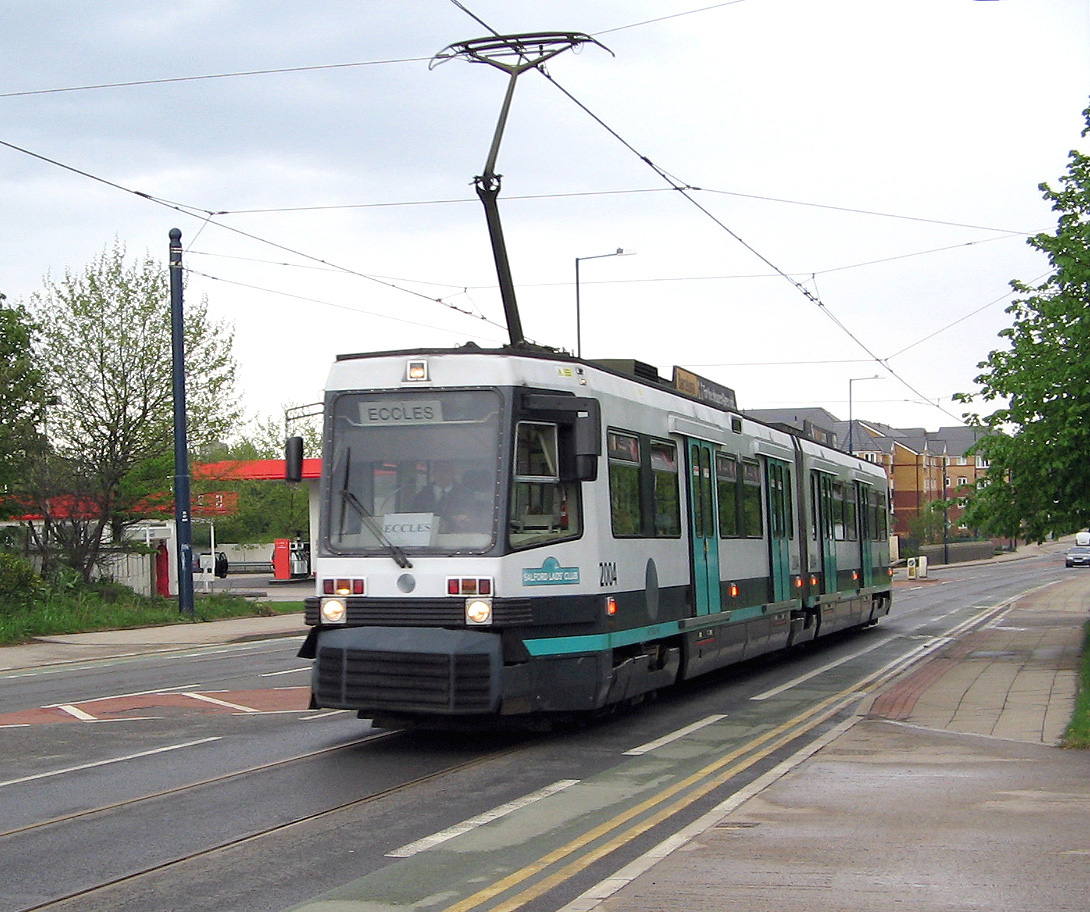
A Metrolink tram in Eccles

Manchester Metrolink is Greater Manchester's urban transit system. The network in 2008 had 3 routes, 37 stations and 23 miles (37 km) of track. The Phase 3a extension already had funding, with surveys and inspection work already underway. Further extensions proposed under the TiF scheme would have increased track mileage to 67 miles (108 km), the number of stops to 108, the combined impact of the recently announced extensions to the Metrolink network (which are not part of TiF) and the impact of TiF extensions would bring to the total passenger capacity to 70 million journeys annually (from 20 million in 2008).

The proposed Phase 3b extension included within the TiF consisted of various extensions to Phase 3a routes:

- Two branch lines running from the Phase 3a terminus at Chorlton-cum-Hardy. One would run to East Didsbury, the other to Manchester Airport
- An extension to the Phase 3a Droylsden branch, to Ashton-under-Lyne
- A street running line running between Mumps and Werneth stations in Oldham, replacing the heavy rail route.
- Extending the Phase 3a Rochdale branch from Rochdale railway station into the town centre
- Funding would also be made available for a branch line to the Trafford Centre.
- A Second City Crossing to increase capacity through Manchester city centre, and to avoid the possibility of tram congestion between G-Mex station and Piccadilly. This would link G-Mex directly with Victoria station, avoiding Piccadilly, with potential new stops at Cross Street and Albert Square - although a slightly longer route along Deansgate was considered.

An additional 40 trams would have been ordered to supplement the 32 then in use on the network, and to provide extra capacity for Phase 3a. The TiF would fund the purchase of a further 58 trams. On the then existing network, capacity enhancements would be primarily along the Altrincham–Bury route: all services would be operated by double units (two trams coupled together) by the end of 2012. Proposed general enhancements to the system included frequency improvements, new 'through' journeys between different regions of Greater Manchester, improved accessibility to the trams, track improvements, real-time customer information systems, security enhancements, and the ability to use the proposed smartcard.

Since the rejection of Tif a plan to achieve most of the same Metrolink investment programme was created drawing funds from increased council tax precepts, commercial loans and the bringing forward of the entitled Dft Regional Funding Allocation from 2010 to 2016. The £1.3bn fund which is also being spent on some road schemes and the BRT scheme enabled £800m of the planned Metrolink investment to proceed. The notable exceptions were the £317m Trafford line, part of the Airport Loop and the Stockport town centre extension.

=== Greater Manchester smartcard ===
The planned smartcard system would cover all modes of transport in the Greater Manchester area, removing the need to buy separate tickets for a multi-modal journey. Operationally, it would be similar to London's Oystercard scheme.

While delayed by the failure of the Tif vote the smartcard has since found £1m annual funding from a new government programme for research and studies into enabling the roll out of smartcards nationally amongst the city regions.

=== Cars ===
Congestion within the Greater Manchester area had remained unchanged for some years. A report released by Greater Manchester Traffic Unit in September 2008 states that "Manchester traffic flows decreased in all time periods between 1997 and 2006. The improvements to the Manchester and Salford Inner Relief Route in 2002 and traffic management measures within the city centre have contributed to this."

The planned congestion charge scheme would be in place by 2013. An anticipated reduction of 10–15% in the number of cars entering the charging zone was expected to both reduce congestion, and decrease journey times. A traffic information and control system would be installed along all of the major routes into Manchester city centre, to monitor incidents, and provide information on problems and diversionary routes. There would be improved park and ride facilities, including new sites on many of the Metrolink extensions and the Leigh–Manchester bus route.

According to the data contained in the TIF bid submitted by Greater Manchester's 10 council leaders to the government, half the cost of congestion to Greater Manchester is caused by traffic that does not travel inside the M60, and those drivers would not be affected by the planned peak-hour congestion charge.

== Congestion charging ==
=== Background ===
The congestion charging system would have been based upon two charging rings, picking up vehicles travelling toward Manchester on weekday mornings between 7 am and 9.30 am, and away from Manchester between 4 pm and 6.30 pm. Drivers would be charged £2 (at 2007 prices) upon crossing the outer ring (just within the M60), and £1 upon crossing the inner ring travelling toward Manchester. During the evening, peak period drivers would be charged £1 upon crossing the inner ring, and £1 when crossing the outer ring.

AGMA's survey of 5,010 residents aged over 16, which was carried out by Ipsos MORI in August 2008, suggests that two thirds of peak time road users would pay a charge for crossing at least one charging rings once, and that one fifth would incur the full charge.

=== Plans ===
The TiF aimed to tackle congestion at the times, places, and direction in which it is most expensive to the economy of Greater Manchester. A key part of the scheme was therefore to introduce a congestion charge. A capped day pass of £5 (at 2007 prices, estimated by AGMA to be £6 by 2013) was proposed for all vehicles, such as multi-drop delivery vehicles which may repeatedly cross charging rings during peak times. HGV and other commercial vehicles would be charged at the same rate as private cars up to the £5 cap. If charging had been introduced, it was claimed by 2013 the average weekday daily charge of £3 at 2007 prices would be no more than £3.60.

=== Commitments ===
AGMA and GMPTA made the following commitments regarding congestion charging in Greater Manchester:

- There would be no charge for any vehicles travelling between 6.30 pm and 7 am or between 9.30 am and 4 pm. Vehicles travelling out of the charging rings between 7 am and 9.30 am would not be charged, and vehicles entering the charging rings between 4 pm and 6.30 pm would not be charged. There would be no charge for any vehicles weekends or on Bank Holidays. Drivers not crossing one of the charging rings during their journey would not be charged, and drivers travelling on the M60 or inner ring road would not be charged.

=== Discounts ===
A range of discounts would have been made available under the scheme. Motorcycles, Black Taxi Cabs and Private Hire Cars would be entitled to a full discount. Cars, vans and trucks entering the first zone through Trafford Park would have a 100% discount until the Metrolink extension through Trafford Park was complete. For the first two years of the scheme, people on the minimum wage would receive a discount of 20% on both public transport fares and the congestion charge. People who have hospital or medical appointments would be entitled to a 100% discount.

== Reaction ==
=== Public ===
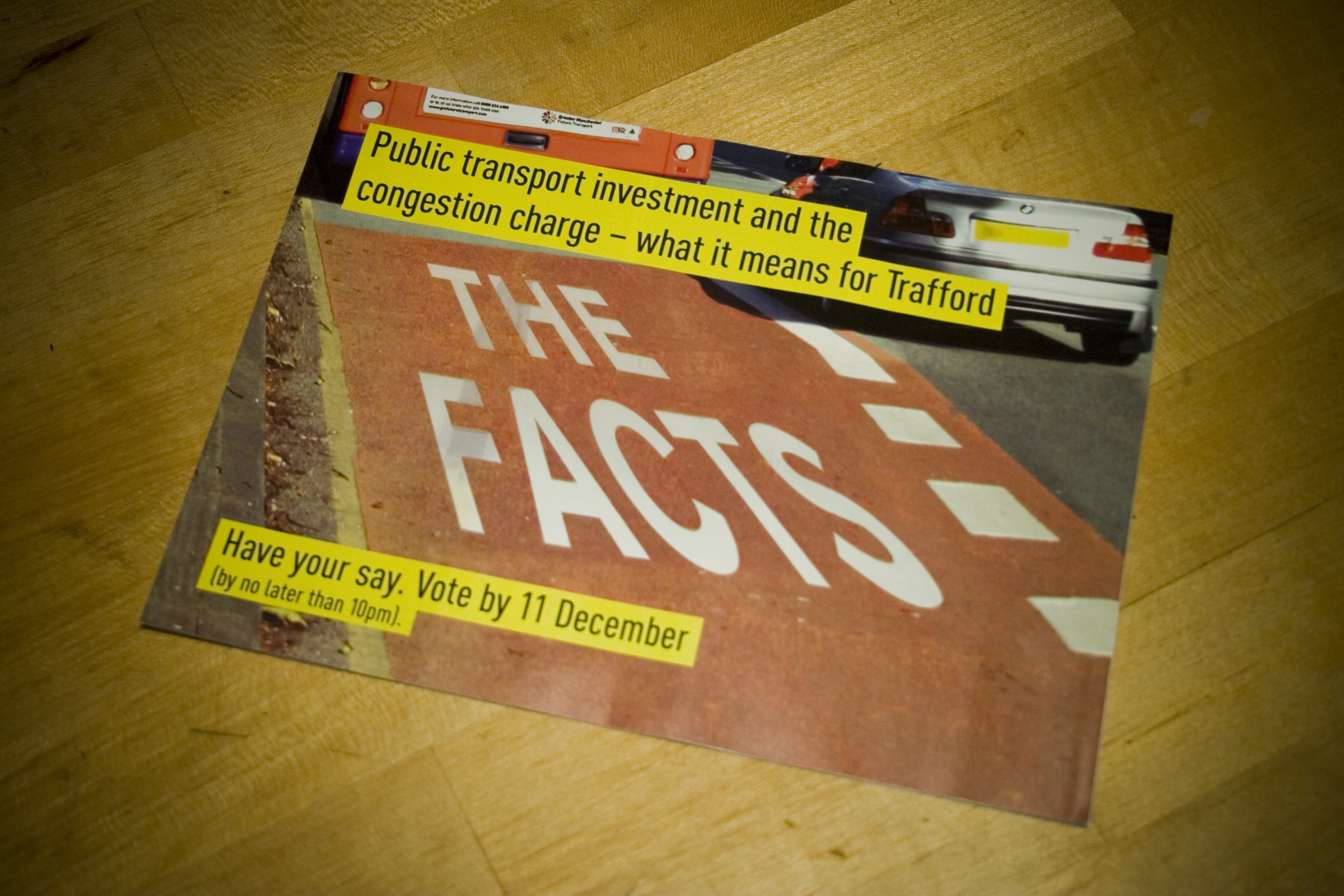
A GMPTA leaflet sent to homes in November 2008

An independent survey conducted in June by Populus, and reported by the BBC on 17 June 2008, indicated that less than a third of residents of Greater Manchester supported the proposals.

According to "secret polling data" obtained by the Manchester Evening News in August 2008, a survey of more than 5,000 people by Ipsos MORI showed that 53% of Greater Manchester would vote in favour of the TiF bid in a referendum. The survey demonstrated a majority in each of the 10 boroughs including Stockport, Bury and Trafford whose councils have previously opposed the scheme.

The consultation process commissioned by AGMA into the public's attitude to the £2.7bn Transport Innovation Fund package suggested that a majority of respondents contacted in every borough of Greater Manchester had negative comments. The organisers of the consultation (Ipsos MORI) stated that this demonstrated that respondents had either a positive or negative attitude to at least one of the elements of the package, and not necessarily that they had a positive or negative attitude to the package as a whole.

=== Business ===
Opinion on the TiF proposals in business was divided, with various reasons given both for and against the scheme. United City, a group of local businesses, supported the proposals, however the Greater Manchester Momentum Group, an alliance of over 250 employers, did not.

As part of AGMA's formal consultation into the proposals, it commissioned IPSOS Mori to conduct research amongst 1,002 Greater Manchester businesses in July and August 2008. Their findings indicated that more businesses opposed the plans than supported them. "When asked the extent to which they support or oppose the offer from the Government, one half of respondents oppose (40% “strongly oppose” and 10% “tend to oppose”) and three in ten support (10% “strongly support” and 20% “tend to support”) with approaching one in six (16%) stating neither support nor oppose." A survey of Greater Manchester Chamber of Commerce members in November 2008 revealed that of those who responded (15% of members), 72% did not view the proposed congestion charge as an acceptable trade off for the investment in public transport and predicted reduction in levels of congestion, and 63% of respondents were opposed to congestion charging in principle. 40% of respondents said that if the charge did come in they would adapt by changing delivery and meeting times, and 30% would introduce more flexible working.

In a letter to the Manchester Evening News, Alex Ferguson, manager of Manchester United F.C., backed the Greater Manchester TIF bid. He said the proposals "offer a once in a lifetime opportunity to put Greater Manchester in the premier league for public transport - so don't score an own goal". John Wilkinson, owner of Salford Reds Rugby Club, said "I can't see Sir Alex coming to the games by the tram from Altrincham or going to training at Carrington. It is all right to say these things, but you have got to get involved in it".

=== Political ===
On 1 July 2008 the Labour Member of Parliament for Worsley, Barbara Keeley, raised a number of concerns in the House of Commons about the TIF consultation process, which she summed up by saying: "It is my firm view that the consultation proposed by the Association of Greater Manchester Authorities and the passenger transport executive is not up to the task."

According to the BBC, motoring groups reacted with anger to the announcement, with the Manchester Against Tolls group describing the day of the announcement as a "bad day for drivers all over Britain". The group called the maximum £5 charge a "Trojan horse" and said this would just be the start of charges for road users. "Ken Livingstone has already demonstrated in London what will happen — he increased the £5 charge to £8 and has doubled the size of the charge zone," a spokesman said. "Road pricing is just another poll tax and will hit less well off drivers the hardest. The intention can only be to try and force them off the road."

The Chairman of the GMPTE Roger Jones lost his seat in the 2008 local by-elections to the candidate of the Community Action Party which campaigned on a platform of opposing the congestion charge on which the TIF plans are based. After his defeat Mr. Jones said "I don’t think my defeat will change things, but it will make everyone a bit more wary. The hardest job for TIF supporters will be explaining the facts to the public." He also pointed out: "When you ask people if they want congestion charging they say no. If you ask whether they want improved public transport they say yes."

A cross party "Stop the Charge" alliance of eight MPs and the council leaders of the already opposed Bury, Trafford and Stockport councils was formed to campaign for a no vote in the referendum on the proposals.

On 30 November the broadcast watchdog OFCOM ruled that the TV advertising campaign by GMPTE which was funded by the Department for Transport and which was intended to be an unbiased presentation of the facts concerning the TiF proposals was biased in favour of the scheme and was in breach of guidelines on political impartiality.

=== Regional Ballot Results ===
Votes in response to the Greater Manchester Transport Referendum
Region	Turnout (%)	Yes	No	Yes (%)	No (%)
Bolton	48.8	20,529	79,910	21	79
Bury	57.4	16,563	64,001	21	79
Rochdale	50.8	17,333	68,884	20	80
Oldham	54.4	17,571	68,884	20	80
Wigan	45.3	27,810	78,565	26	74
Salford	57.0	14,603	79,326	16	84
Manchester	46.1	43,593	113,064	28	72
Tameside	60.7	16,323	83,105	17	83
Trafford	63.6	20,445	83,568	20	80
Stockport	59.0	24,090	103,706	19	81
TOTAL	53.2	218,860	812,815	21.2	78.8
Source: Manchester Evening News C-Charge Results

== Post Referendum ==
The results indicated a strong disapproval of the scheme with support ranging from only 16% to 28% and attracted a combined support of only 1/5 of voters. The AGMA initially refused to drop the scheme in interviews with the press after the count stating the results would be the subject of discussion at the next meeting, but at that next meeting they were officially dropped. Work then began in secret to salvage the work of the Tif with an agreement signed between the local councils 30 Jan 2009. and by May 2009 the 10 local councils had agreed a new funding proposal which costed and ranked the individual Tif spending proposals along with several other existing local transport proposals by need with three budget proposals combining varied increased top slicing of local councils existing transport budgets (20/40/60%) as well as a small council tax rise of 3% and a loan supplemented with already promised national government money not conditional on the congestion charge. On 12 May 2009, the mid-sized budget was selected allowing £1.2bn to be raised for spending on both the phase 3a and 3b metrolink extension along with various road and bus improvements. The proposed congestion charge, travel card, increased trains and most of the station improvements were dropped.

The rejection also led to the demise of the Transport Innovation Fund grants offered to councils outside Greater London between 2005 and 2010 who implemented congestion charging to fund large-scale capital investment in transport. After the referendum other councils such as Durham and Cambridgeshire which had submitted bids and others in the process of submitting withdrew their applications. In March 2010 the government formally began the process of closing down the fund and the £9.5bn funding which had been allocated to potential recipients between 2008 and 2015 was reallocated to plug the Crossrail funding gap contrary to its original intention of financing transport investment outside the capital.

== See also ==
- Manchester congestion charge
- Transport in Manchester
- Transport Innovation Fund (TIF)
