= Transport in Greater Manchester =

Overview of the transport infrastructure of Greater Manchester

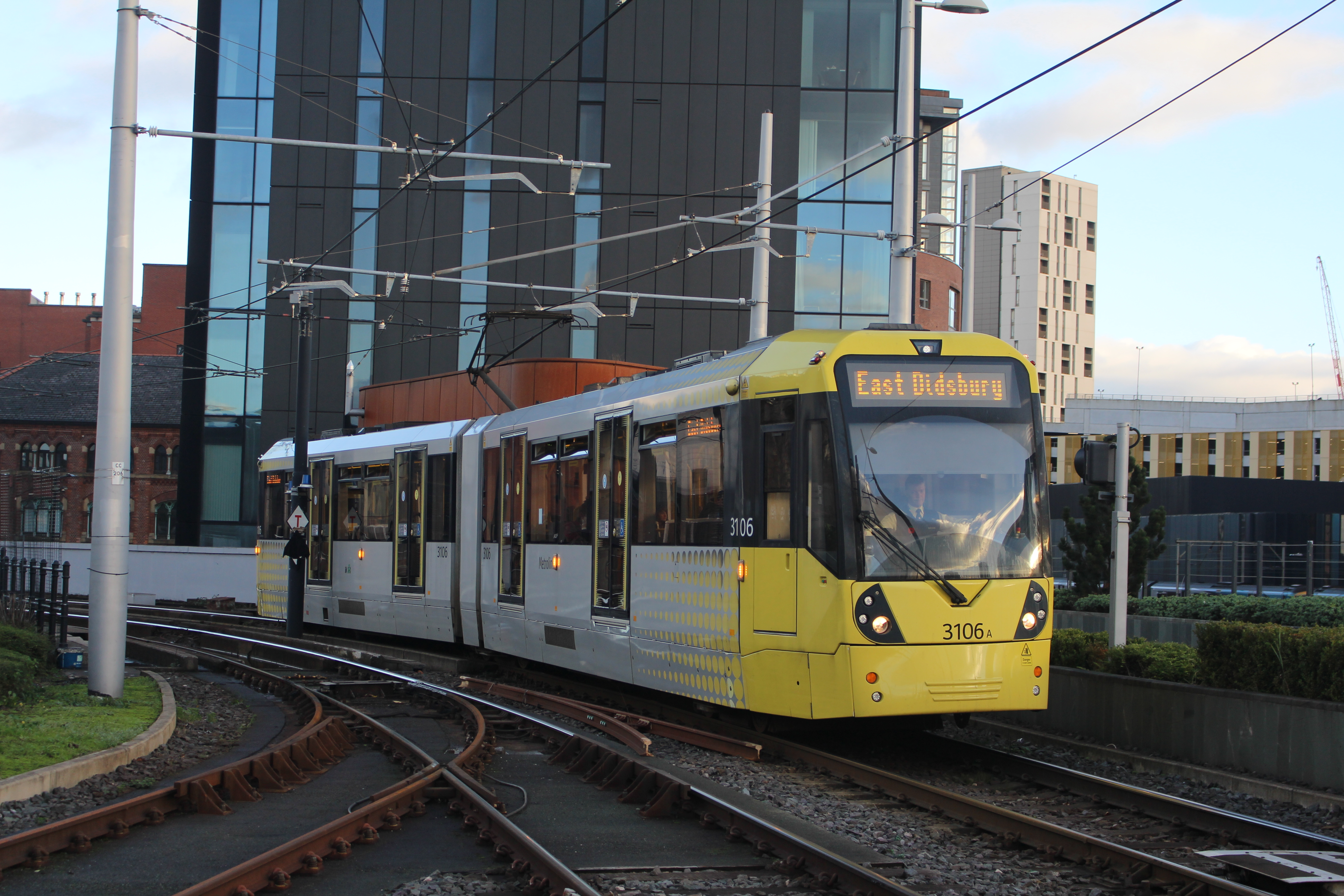
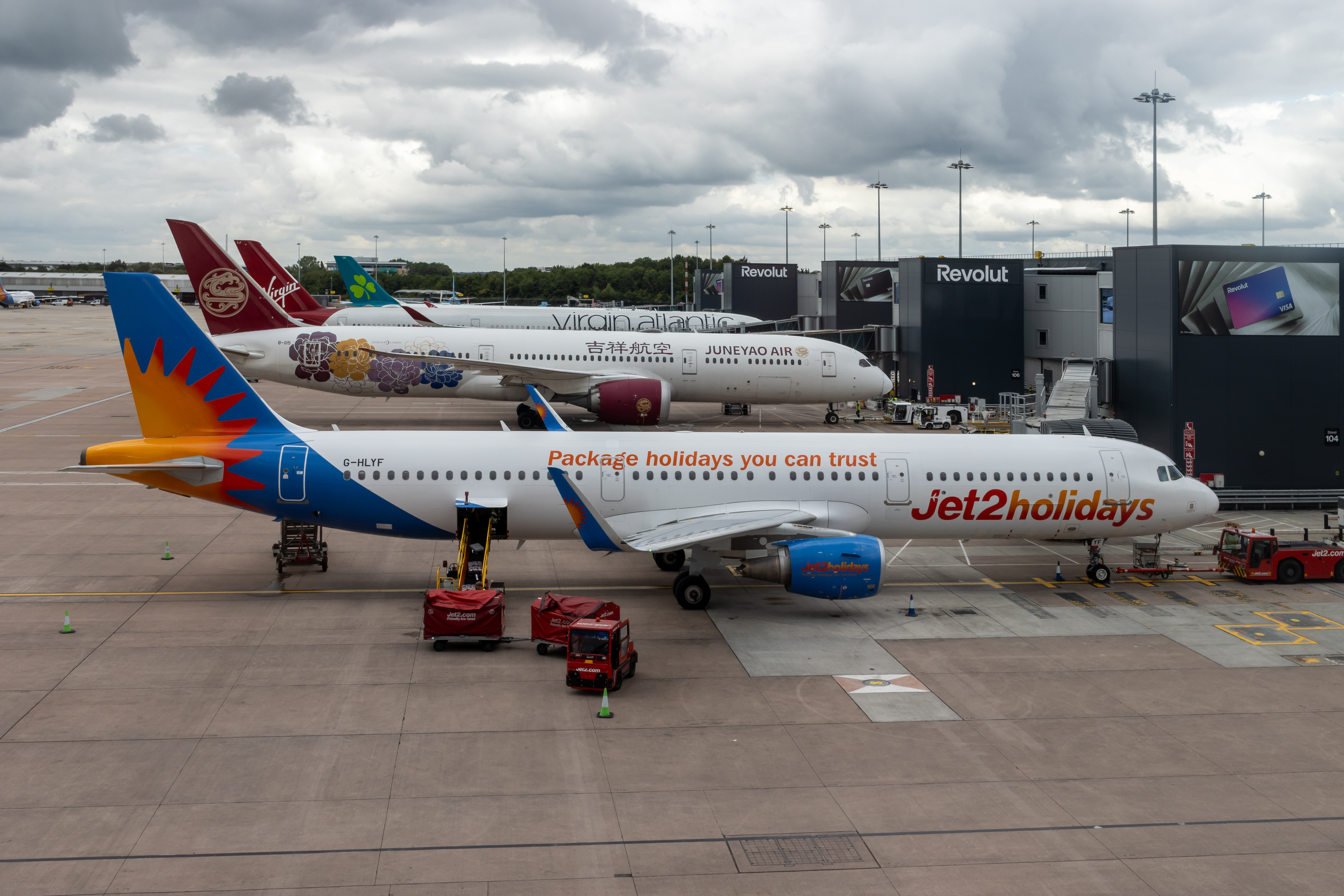
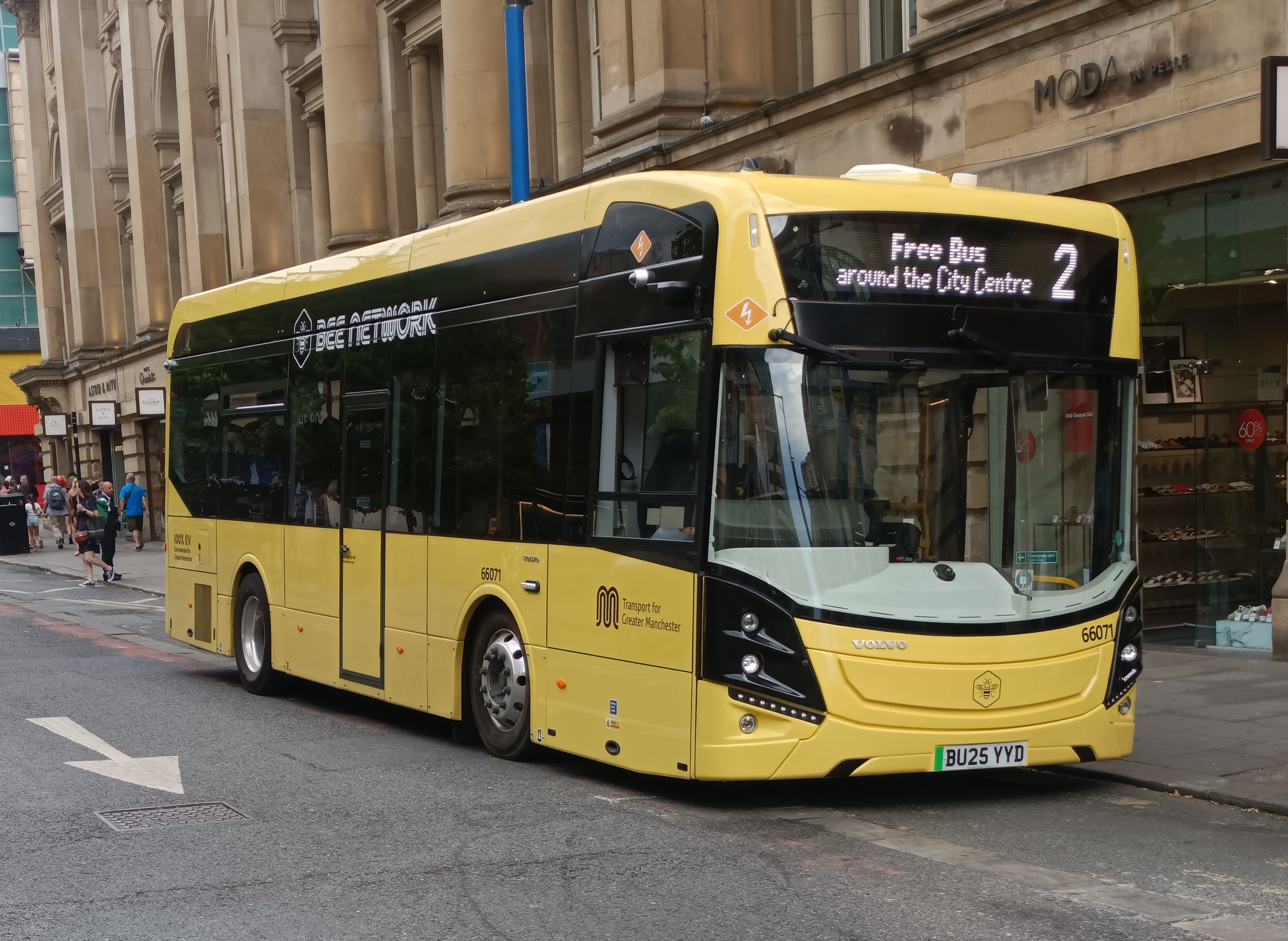
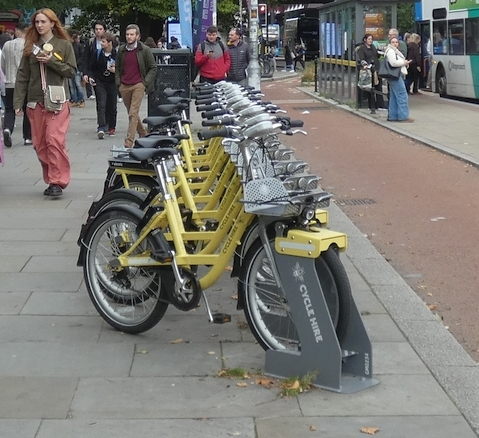
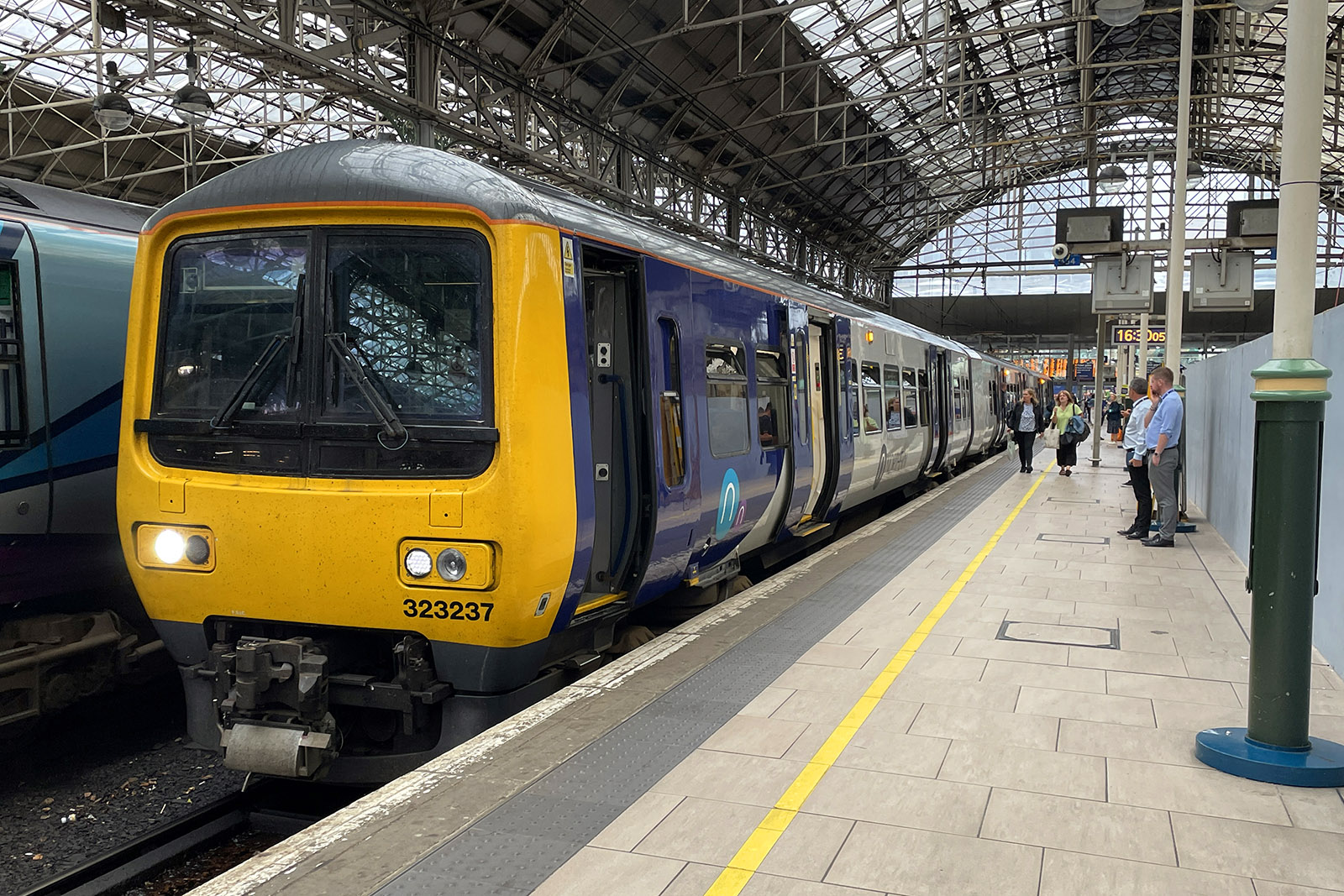
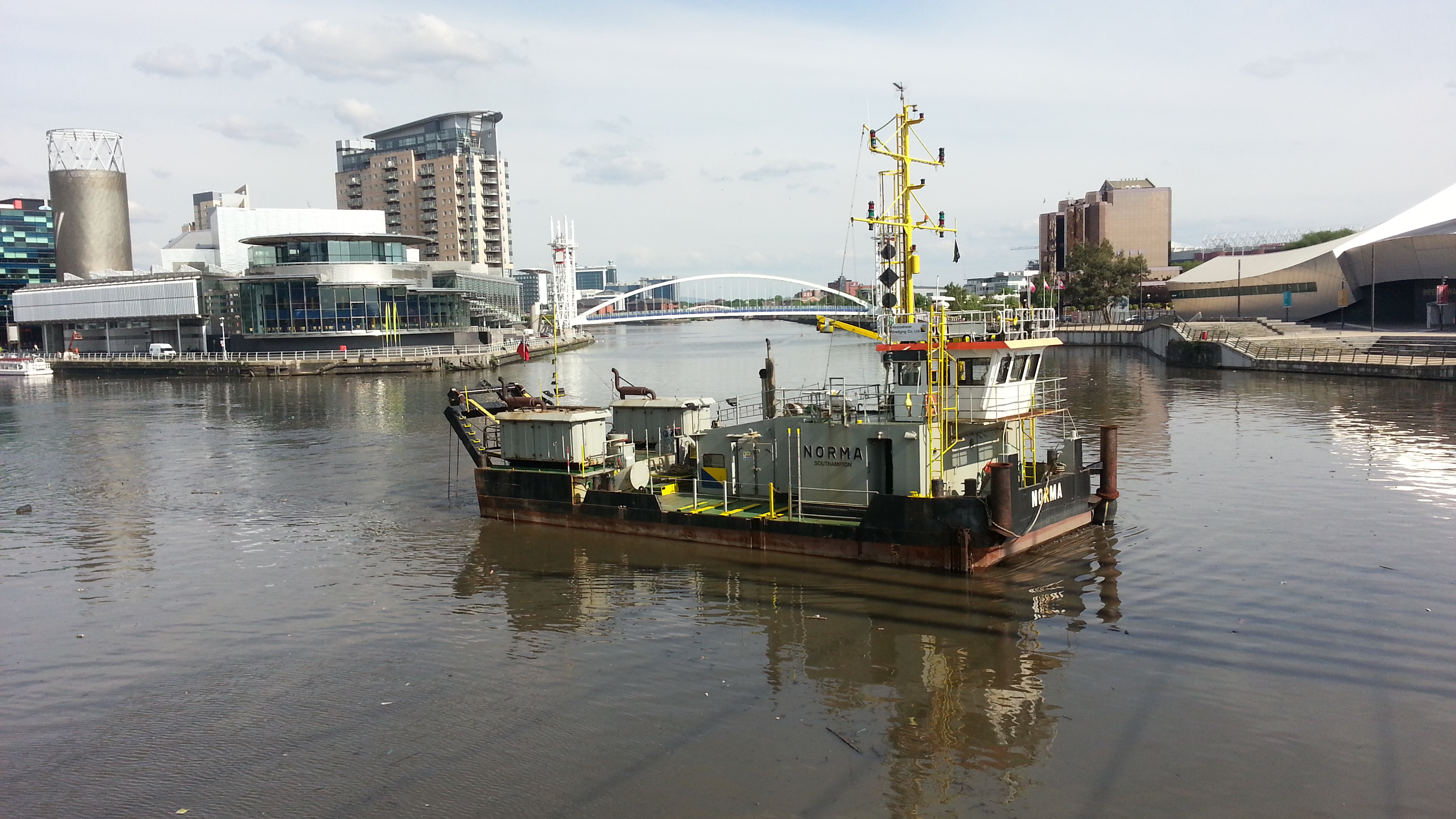
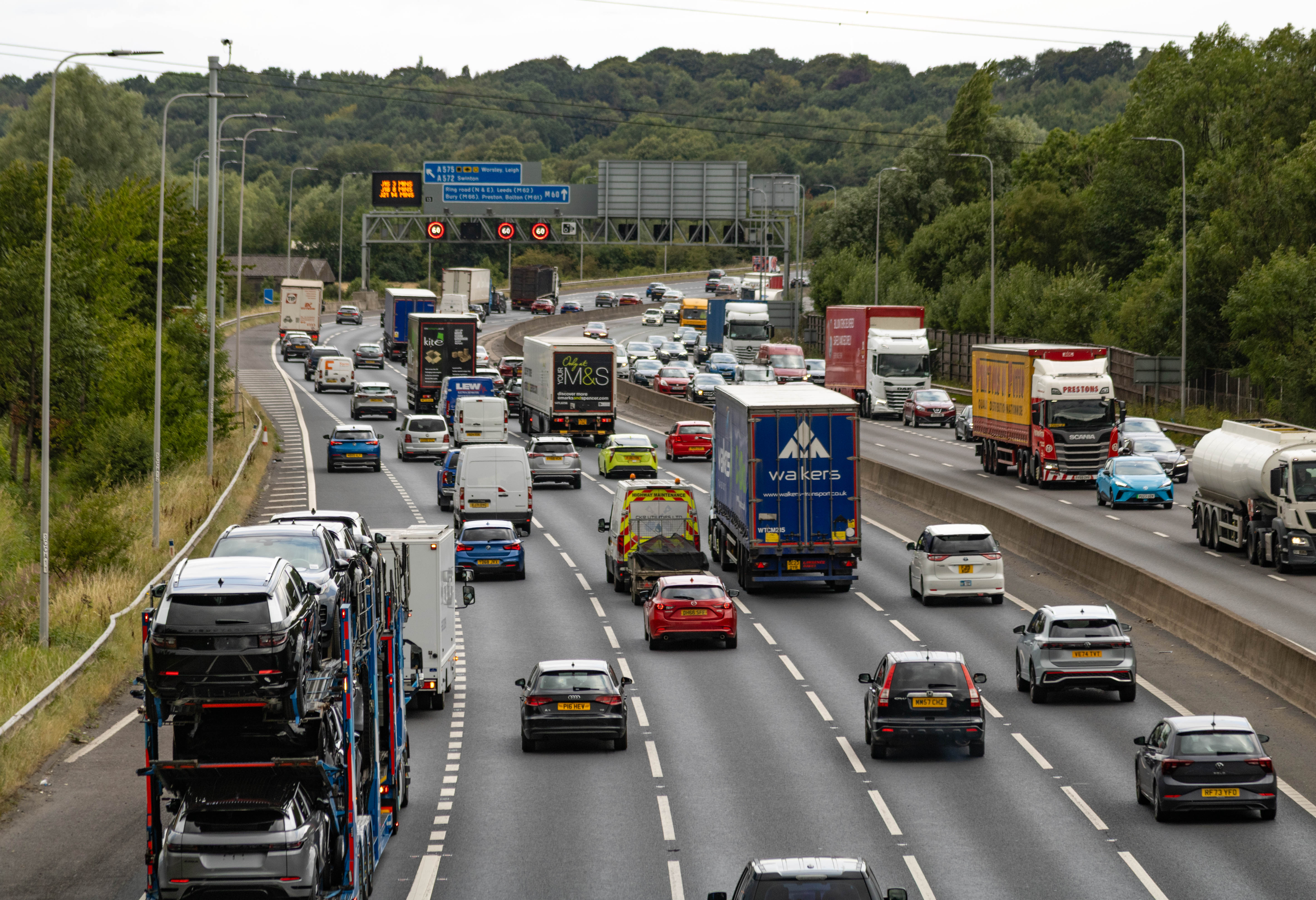
- From top to bottom, left to right: A Manchester Metrolink train; Planes at Manchester Airport; A Bee Network bus; Bicycles parked at a cycle hire station; A Northern train at Manchester Piccadilly station; A tug boat on the Manchester Ship Canal; Vehicles on the M60 motorway

Overview
- Locale: Greater Manchester
- Transit type: Buses, car, cycling, airport, commuter rail, tram, tram-train, high speed rail (proposed)
- Number of lines: Bus routes: 600+ Tram: 8 Rail: 16
- Number of stations: Bus stops: 12,000; Tram stops: 99; Train stations: 101
- Daily ridership: 824,657 (2014)

Operation
- Operator: Transport for Greater Manchester (TfGM)

The transport infrastructure of Greater Manchester is built up of numerous transport modes and forms an integral part of the structure of Greater Manchester and North West England – the most populated region outside of South East England which had approximately 301 million annual passenger journeys using either buses, planes, trains or trams in 2014. Its position as a national city of commerce, education and cultural importance means the city has one of the largest and most thorough transport infrastructures which is heavily relied upon by its 2.8 million inhabitants in the Greater Manchester conurbation and further afield in the North West region. Public transport comes under the jurisdiction of Transport for Greater Manchester.

Greater Manchester still has an extensive citywide rail network compared with other British cities with over 200 tram and train stations - much of which dates from the Industrial Revolution. Two mainline termini (Piccadilly and Victoria) and two through mainline railway stations in the central area (Deansgate and Oxford Road) form the Manchester station group.

Manchester Airport is the third busiest airport in the United Kingdom after Heathrow and Gatwick. The city also has an extensive network of canal systems which converge into Manchester. The Manchester Ship Canal, built in 1894, was the largest ship canal in the world on opening and is incomparable to any other canal in the United Kingdom, which are mostly built for narrowboats and barges.

It was the first city in the United Kingdom to re-introduce trams to the streets with the 1992 opening of Manchester Metrolink, which is currently the largest network in the UK, having surpassed the Tyne & Wear Metro. As of January 2022 it has 99 stops, with the line to the Trafford Centre having opened in March 2020.

Greater Manchester is in the midst of a public transport revolution, with a new, centralised entity - the Bee Network - bringing tram, bus and eventually rail into a unified transport network. The network is controlled by the Greater Manchester Combined Authority, through Transport for Greater Manchester and has seen the area through bus re-regulation, allowing fares to be capped, routes protected and investments to be made into an all-electric fleet of buses. The network has become an iconic local symbol, especially its yellow liveries across tram and bus vehicles, the logo of a worker bee a nod to the city region's working past.

== Ticketing ==
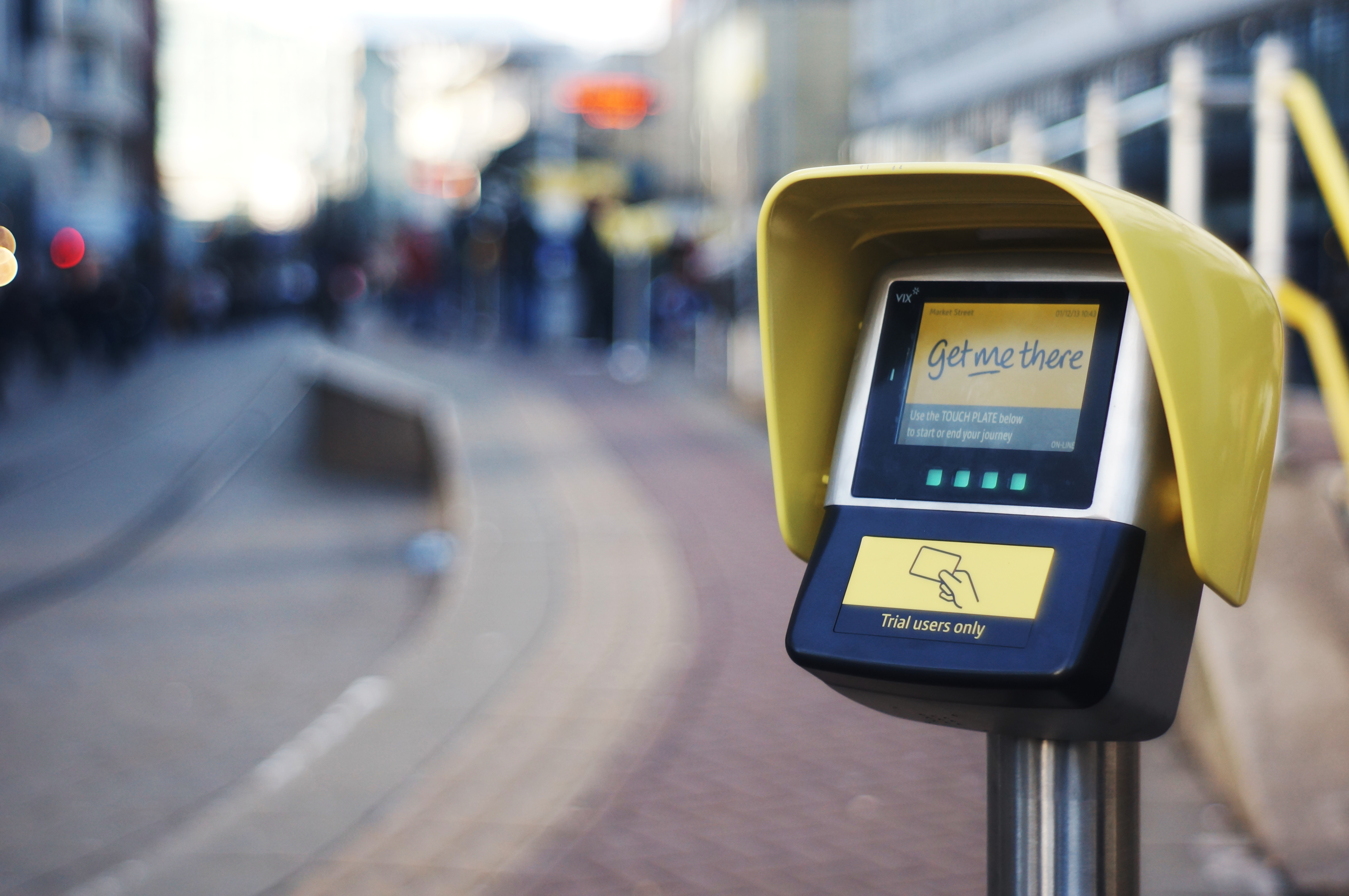
Smart ticketing was rolled out across Greater Manchester in 2015.

A variety of travelcards are available for passengers in Greater Manchester under the System One banner. System One travelcards provide a daily, weekly, monthly or yearly pass and have varying options, offering combined multi-mode travel passes for bus, tram and train.

== Air ==
=== Manchester Airport ===
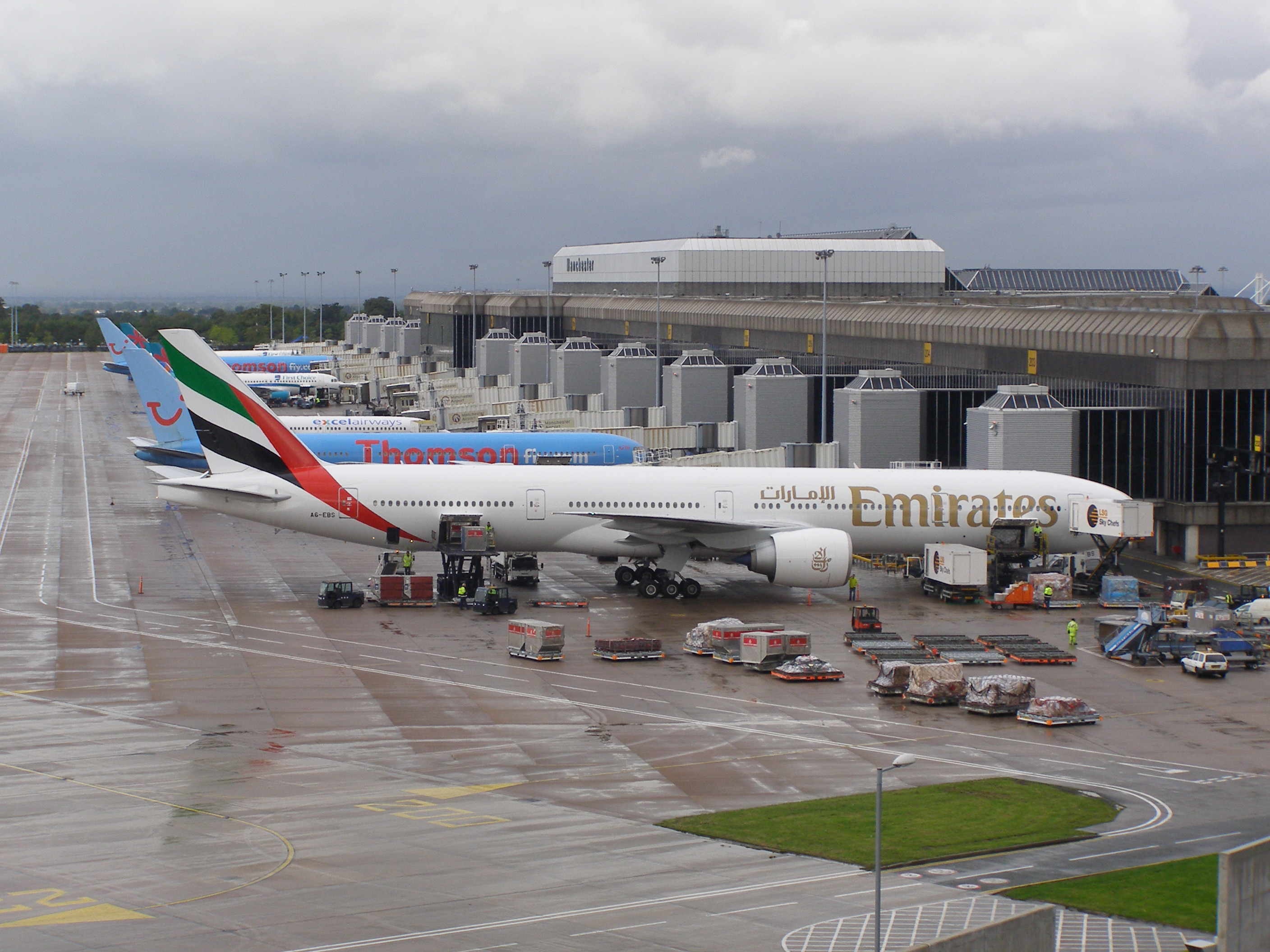
Terminal 2 at Manchester Airport

Manchester Airport, originally Ringway Airport, is the busiest airport outside London by a considerable margin with over double the passengers of its nearest non-London rival, Edinburgh Airport. With over 200 destinations, the Airport serves the most destinations of any airport in the United Kingdom and is viewed as the international flight hub for the whole of Northern England, North Wales and parts of the Midlands. In 2008 the airport handled 21.2 million passengers but was badly affected by the 2008 financial crisis. The Airport gradually recovered and had become the fastest growing major airport in the United Kingdom by 2014 with 20.7 million passengers.

North American scheduled destinations served directly include New York City (JFK and Newark), Atlanta, Boston, Chicago, Houston, Las Vegas, Los Angeles, Miami, Orlando, Philadelphia, Washington D.C., Calgary, Toronto, Vancouver and Barbados.

Middle Eastern and Asian destinations include Abu Dhabi, Beijing, Doha, Dubai, Hong Kong, Islamabad, Karachi, Lahore and Singapore. There are also firm plans for non-stop services to Bangkok. Many European and domestic destinations are served. Manchester to London is one of the highest density airline routes within the UK and is one of the busiest domestic sectors in Europe, but is now experiencing serious competition from the improved railway link.

It is served by a dedicated railway station and a dedicated Metrolink line.

=== Manchester Barton Aerodrome ===
A smaller Manchester Barton Aerodrome exists 9.3 km (6 mi) to the west of Manchester city centre. It was Manchester's first municipal airport and became the site of the first air traffic control tower in the UK, and the first municipal airfield in the UK to be licensed by the Air Ministry. Today, private charter flights and general aviation use City. It also has a flight school, and both the Greater Manchester Police Air Support Unit and the North West Air Ambulance have helicopters based there.

== Road ==
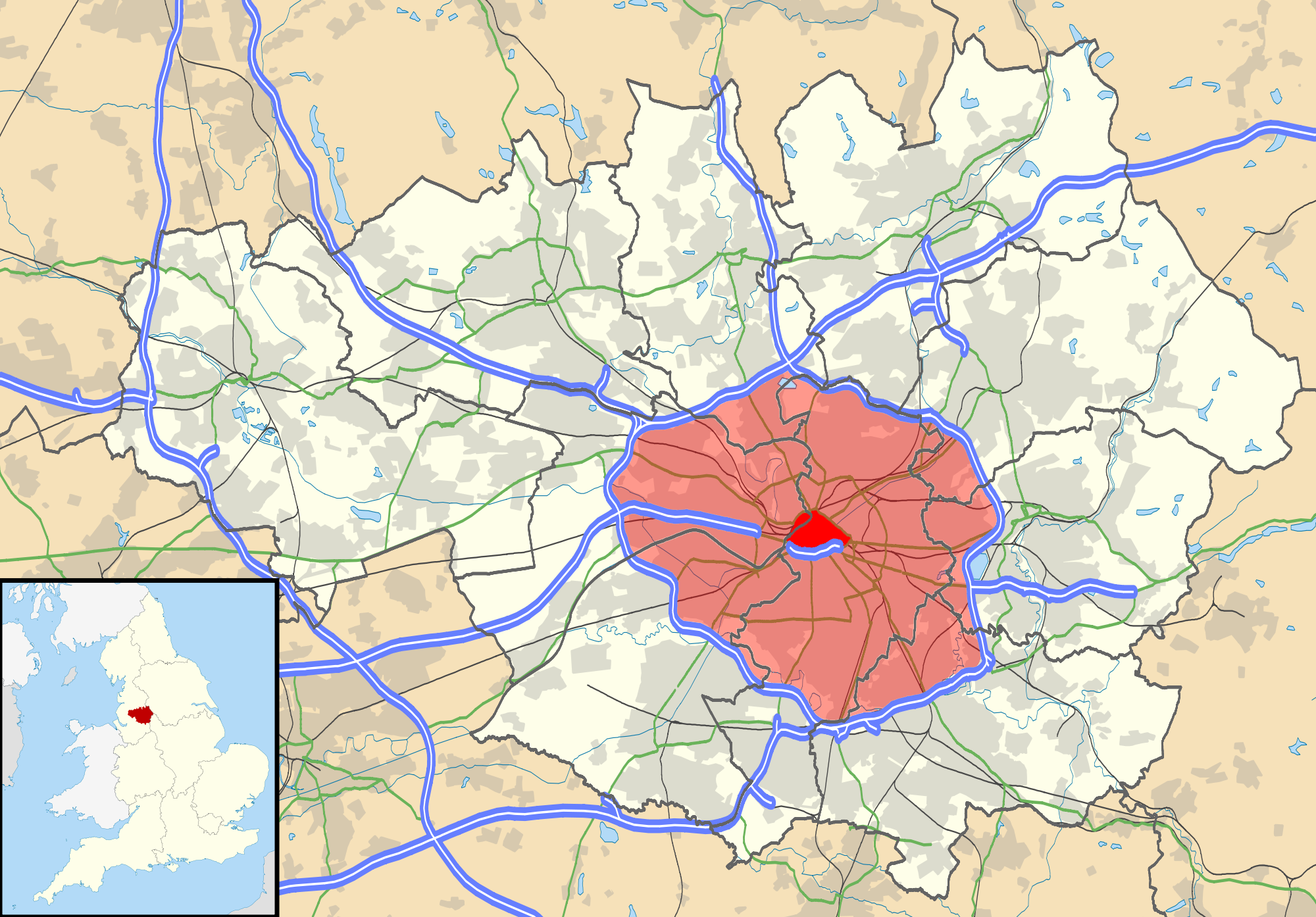
A map of the Manchester motorway and main road network showing the convergence of routes.

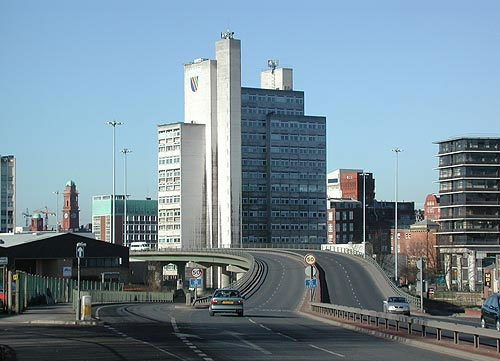
A view of the Mancunian Way elevated motorway which cuts through the city centre.

The city of Manchester is the least car dependent city in the United Kingdom with 243 cars for every 1000 people but remains one of the most congested cities in Europe due to the dense nature of the Greater Manchester conurbation. Research in 2008 suggested that Manchester is the fourth most congested city in Europe. Another study in 2014 ranked Manchester as the most congested city in the United Kingdom outside London.

In May 2017, Transport for Greater Manchester said that it was considering bringing in a revenue neutral £7.50 daily charge for drivers of polluting vehicles as part of plans for Clean Air Zones. However Andy Burnham, mayor of Greater Manchester, said that he would not introduce such a charge, although legal responsibility lies with councils rather than the mayor. In September 2018, the leaders of the local councils in Greater Manchester met to discuss charging the most polluting vehicles in a bid to improve the poor air quality in Manchester, which is responsible for around 1,000 premature deaths a year. Around 20% of private cars in the region, mostly pre-2015 diesels, and 70% of buses would be hit by the charge. The council leaders have a statutory responsibility to present plans reducing the amount of harmful nitrogen oxide in the air to legal limits to the Department of Environment, Food and Rural Affairs by 31 December 2018 and must implement a Clean Air Zone unless a suitable alternative compliance strategy can be identified. To meet the statutory requirements other cities such as Birmingham and Leeds have already decided to introduce Clean Air Zones while London is expanding its existing zones operating hours to 24 hours per day. The Greater Manchester Combined Authority after much delay decided to introduce a Clean Air Zone to the entire area of Greater Manchester. However, no vehicles are required to pay.

Greater Manchester and Greater London are the only two UK conurbations with a separately numbered orbital motorway (though it is possible to circumnavigate Birmingham via several differently numbered motorways). The Manchester ring road is called the M60. Unlike London's M25, the M60 actually runs within the Greater Manchester conurbation providing good inter-suburban links, rather than around the outside of the conurbation. The M60 has 27 junctions, numbered clockwise from junction 1 at Stockport in the south-east.

The M60 between junction 16 (Pendlebury/Kearsley) and junction 17 (Prestwich/Whitefield) is the second busiest section of road in the UK, after the M25 at junctions 13 & 14 (Heathrow). In 2010, it was decided that ramp metering would be used at numerous junctions on the M60 in an attempt to cut queues.

The city also has an inner ring road. Part of this is the A57/A57(M) (known as The Mancunian Way), which runs south of the city centre, linking the western M602 (which spurs from the M62) to the eastern M60 and M67.

The other main motorways serving Manchester are the M56 (to the airport, Chester and the M6 southbound to Birmingham), the M61 (to Bolton, Preston and the M6 northbound to Lancaster), the M62 (west to Liverpool and east to Leeds and Kingston upon Hull), the M66 (to Bury) and the M67, which was originally planned as a route to Sheffield but was never completed. All of these motorways connect with the M60.

== Cycling ==
To combat growing vehicular traffic and pollution, the city of Manchester actively encourages cycling and in recent years has introduced dedicated cycle lanes segregated from bus traffic on main thoroughfares into the city centre as well as a cycle sharing scheme delivered in collaboration with Mobike which was rolled out in 2017.

As part of their Bee Network initiative, Transport for Greater Manchester have designated several traffic-free routes within the M60 motorway as "cycleways". Several routes of Sustrans' National Cycle Network also pass through or near Manchester city centre including the 6, 55, 60, 62 and 66.

== Rail ==
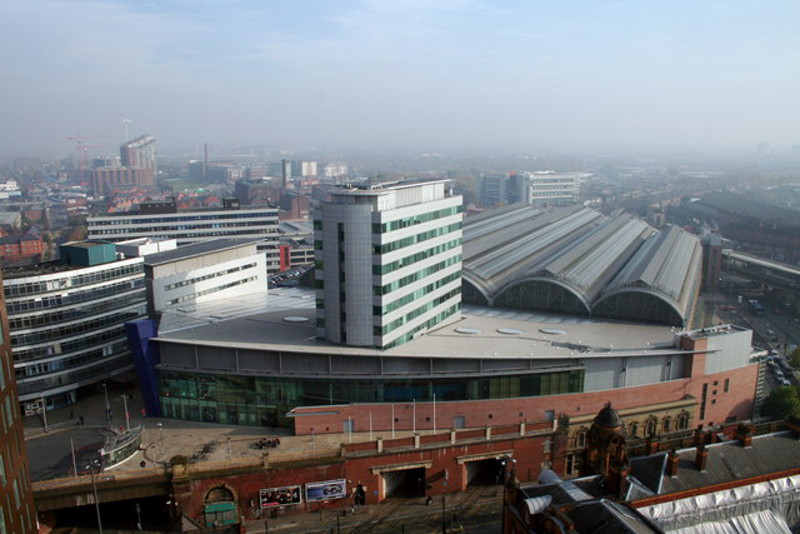
Piccadilly, Manchester's main terminus and busiest station
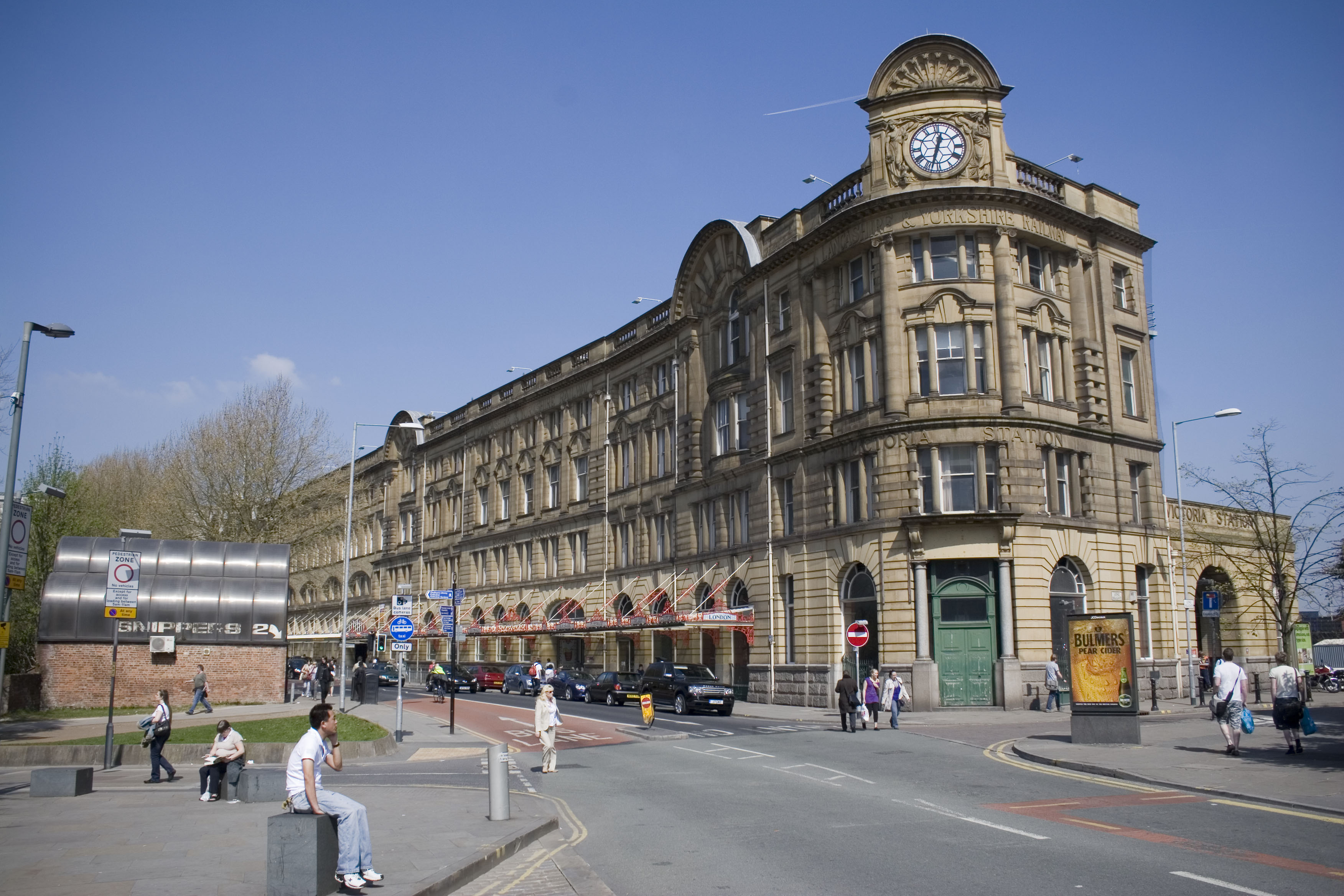
Victoria, Manchester's secondary station serving rail routes throughout Northern England
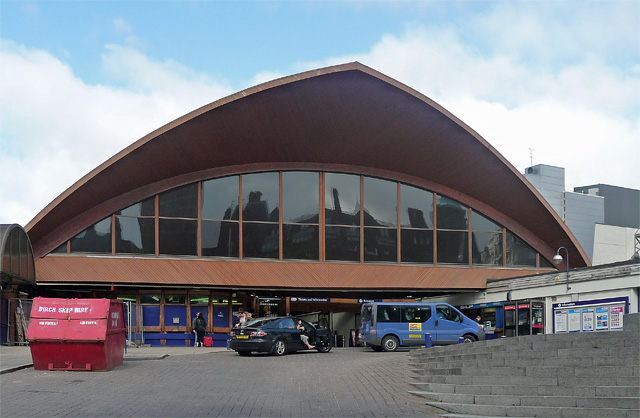
Oxford Road, an elevated station for passing rail services to Wales, Scotland and the Midlands
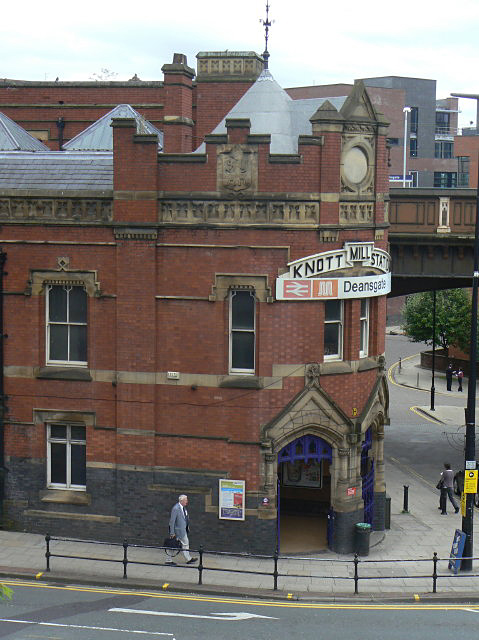
Deansgate, the smallest of the group with limited stopping rail services
Map of rail and tram services in Greater Manchester

Manchester holds a pivotal position in railway history as a birthplace of passenger rail travel on the Liverpool and Manchester Railway, which opened in 1830. Railway links to London were established by 1842. By the turn of the 20th century, the city centre was encircled by large termini stations, which included:

- Manchester London Road (now Manchester Piccadilly)
- Manchester Victoria
- Manchester Central
- Manchester Exchange
- Manchester Mayfield

Cutbacks followed the Beeching Report in the 1960s, with Manchester Central, Manchester Exchange and Manchester Mayfield closing to passengers. All rail services in the city centre were then mainly concentrated on Manchester Piccadilly and Manchester Victoria as well as the smaller Oxford Road and Deansgate stations. Manchester Piccadilly was the busiest railway station in England outside London in terms of passengers in 2005–2006.

Railways in Greater Manchester
Primary route
Secondary route
Rural route
Goods only
Heritage railway
Metrolink
Disused railway

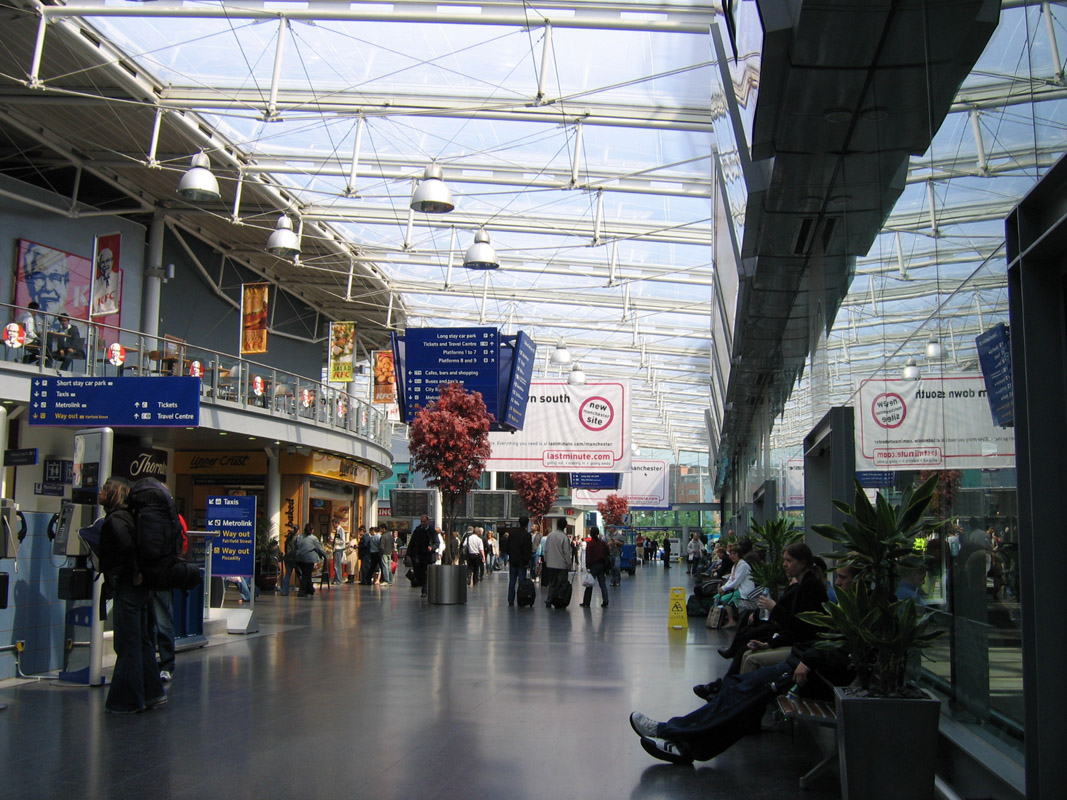
Manchester Piccadilly, the principal station for the City of Manchester and busiest station in Greater Manchester by number of passengers.

Greater Manchester still has an extensive citywide railway network with two mainline termini (Piccadilly and Victoria) and four through mainline railway stations in the central area (Deansgate, Oxford Road, Salford Central and Salford Crescent). Rail use by passengers in Greater Manchester nearly doubled in the ten years from 2001 to 2011 and is predicted to rise by a further 54% from 2011 to 2020. Its central location means the city acts as a key bypass for rail to cities such as Liverpool, Birmingham, Sheffield, Leeds, Newcastle, Glasgow and Edinburgh. Avanti West Coast, CrossCountry, East Midlands Railway, Northern, TransPennine Express and Transport for Wales all operate trains through Manchester. Manchester sits at a rail bottleneck, and it is hoped investment in the Northern Hub scheme by Network Rail will alleviate this.

There are several smaller stations around the city centre, including Oxford Road and Deansgate (formerly Knott Mill), and Salford Central across the Irwell in the City of Salford.

Piccadilly and Victoria are now linked by the city's Metrolink tram system and the Ordsall Chord, a short rail link that opened in 2017. The urban and suburban areas are covered by a sizeable network of railway lines, including to Ashton-under-Lyne, Bolton, Stockport and Wigan. Full timetables are from National Rail Enquiries. The commuter rail network within Greater Manchester (which numbers 101 stations) is the third most extensive (after Glasgow) outside Greater London and the South East.

=== Upgrades and future ===
In recent years, upgrades have been made to existing rail infrastructure in and around Manchester. Piccadilly was renovated prior to the Commonwealth Games in 2002 and has been rated as one of the best large stations in the country. From 1998 to 2008, the West Coast Main Line linking Manchester to Glasgow, Birmingham and London was upgraded reducing journey times but fell short of the targeted 155 mph top speed.

The Manchester hub report was published in 2010 by Network Rail, examining possibilities of how the rail network in Manchester could be improved amid large passenger growth to and from Manchester. Network Rail proposed a £560 million scheme which would alleviate rail bottlenecks across northern England in 2011. Full funding for the project, now called the Northern Hub was confirmed in July 2012, as part of the Government's High Level Output Specification (HLOS) for the rail industry for 2014–2019.

Two new through platforms were planned for Manchester Piccadilly as part of the Northern Hub project. However, in 2023 these plans were cancelled by the government. At present there are twelve terminating platforms but just two through platforms. Congestion is common at peak times and trains often incur delays for following trains down the line at Oxford Road.

Victoria station has undergone a series of upgrades. The station was rated as the worst in the UK following a 2009 study and plans for a new roof have been in place since 1996. Work commenced in April 2013. Installation of the new £17 million ETFE roof began on 5 May 2014 and work on the station was completed in August 2015. Part of the new roof collapsed, injuring some people in October 2016

In 2024, then-Mayor of Greater Manchester, Andy Burnham, announced Greater Manchester Combined Authority's intention to integrate local rail services into the Bee Network, with the first 8 routes joining the network in 2028. This will see full contactless and ticket integration across bus, tram and rail.

== Tram – Metrolink ==
Metrolink consists of 99 stops and 65 miles (105 km) of track over eight lines.

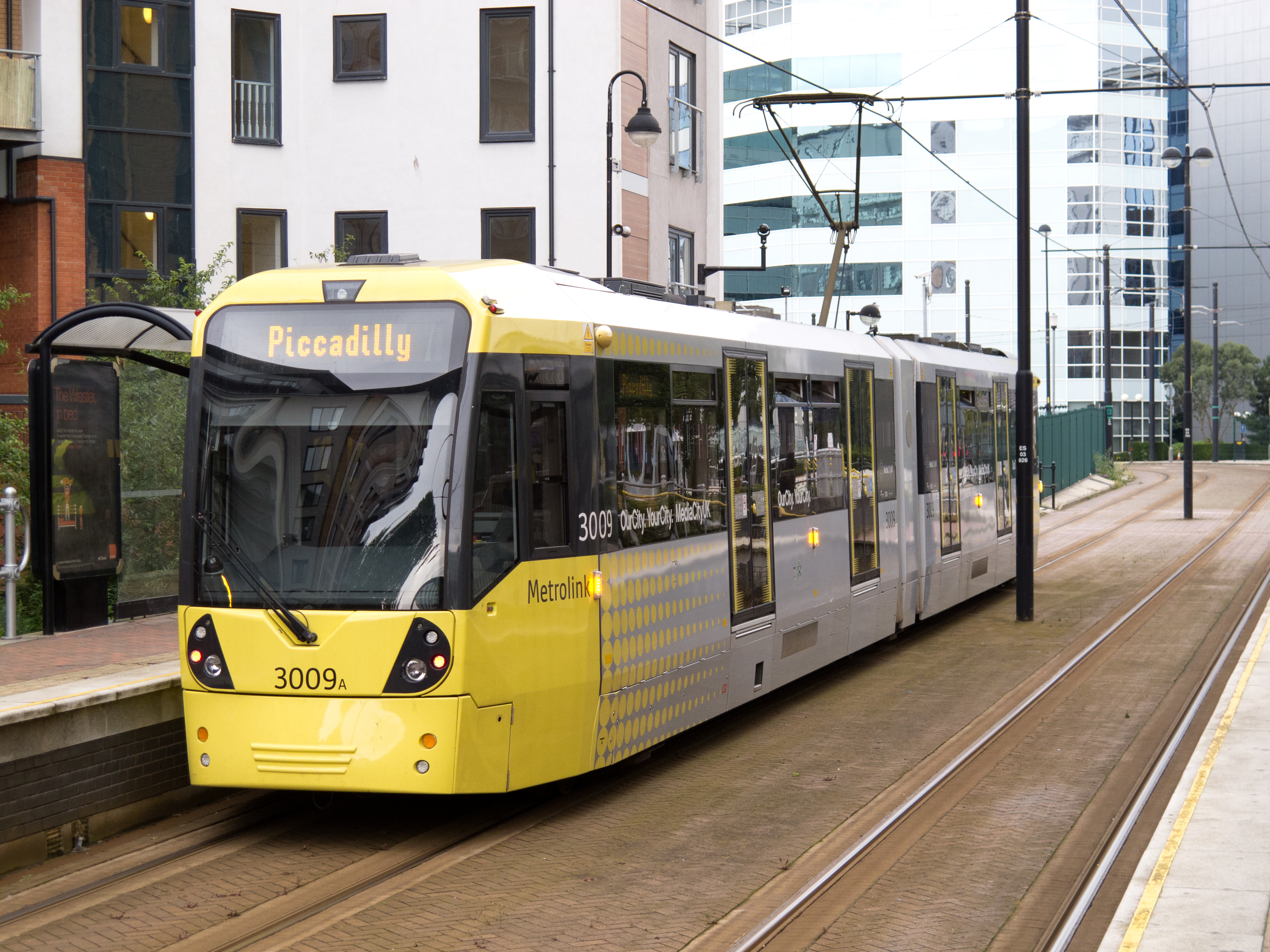
A Bombardier M5000 tram introduced in 2009

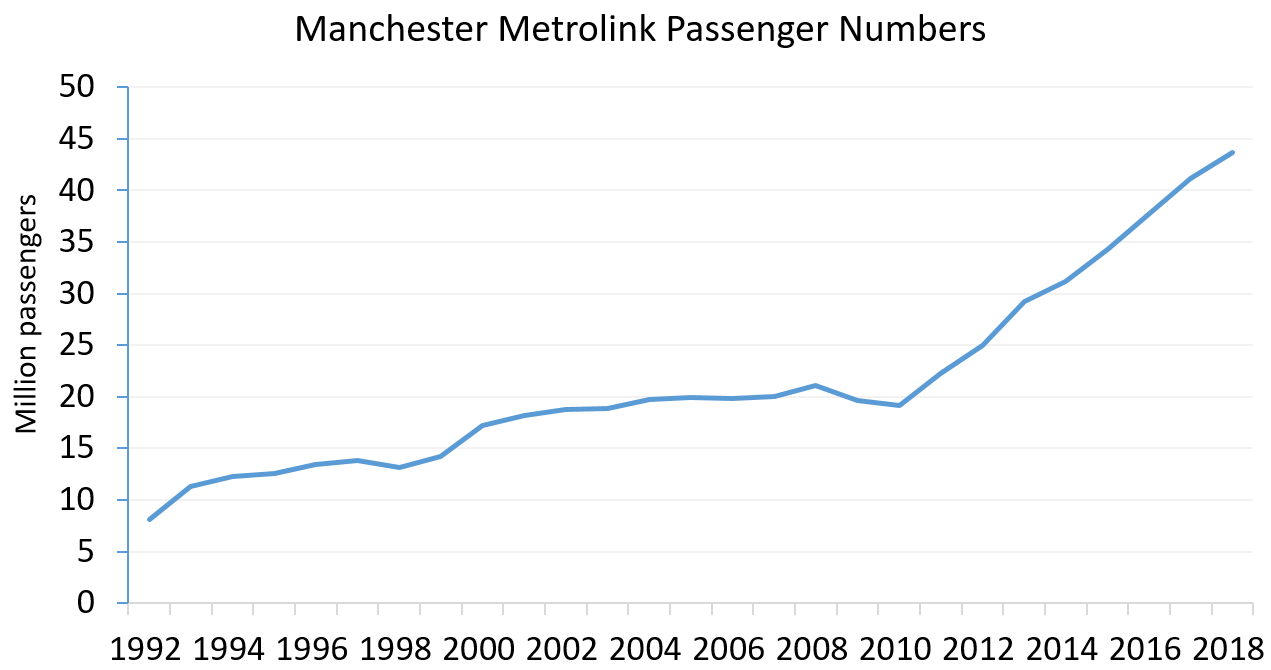
Manchester Metrolink Passenger Numbers from 1992 to 2017

Manchester has an urban light rail / tram system called Manchester Metrolink. Operated by KeolisAmey, Metrolink links the city centre to termini in Altrincham, Ashton-under-Lyne, Bury, Didsbury, Eccles, Manchester Airport, Rochdale and at The Trafford Centre. It is a high-frequency service, with trams running 5 times an hour on every route. It carried 44.3 million passengers in the financial year 2019/2020.

Trams first appeared on the streets of Manchester in 1877 and by 1901 were taken over and electrified by Manchester Corporation Tramways. The system grew to the third largest in the UK but was abandoned in 1949. Proposals for a light rail system in the city grew from a 1970s proposal by SELNEC to build three rapid transit lines. This idea was superseded by the Picc-Vic project but light-rail was resurrected again in the 1980s; it was these proposals which led to the creation of the Metrolink, the first routes of which were opened in 1992.

Plans to extend Metrolink were reinstated after an election-time u-turn by the Labour Government which had rejected the plans months earlier, despite years of support. The Greater Manchester Passenger Transport Executive led the fight to ensure that the extensions be built, with significant support from local councils and communities and Manchester City Council. In July 2006, the government announced a major extension to the Metrolink system, which is intended to form the first phase of the so-called 'big bang' expansion. If the eventual desired system is completed, passenger numbers are predicted to more than double to an estimated 50 million per year.

Since the initial approval of the system from the public, local and national government, and environmental groups, Metrolink has become something of a victim of its own popularity. Many routes are extremely busy, especially at peak times, and prices have risen at far above the rate of inflation. The network has also gained a reputation for being somewhat unreliable. In 2011, Stagecoach Group who operated the Metrolink under contract to Transport for Greater Manchester, sold the contract to the RATP Group.

== Bus ==
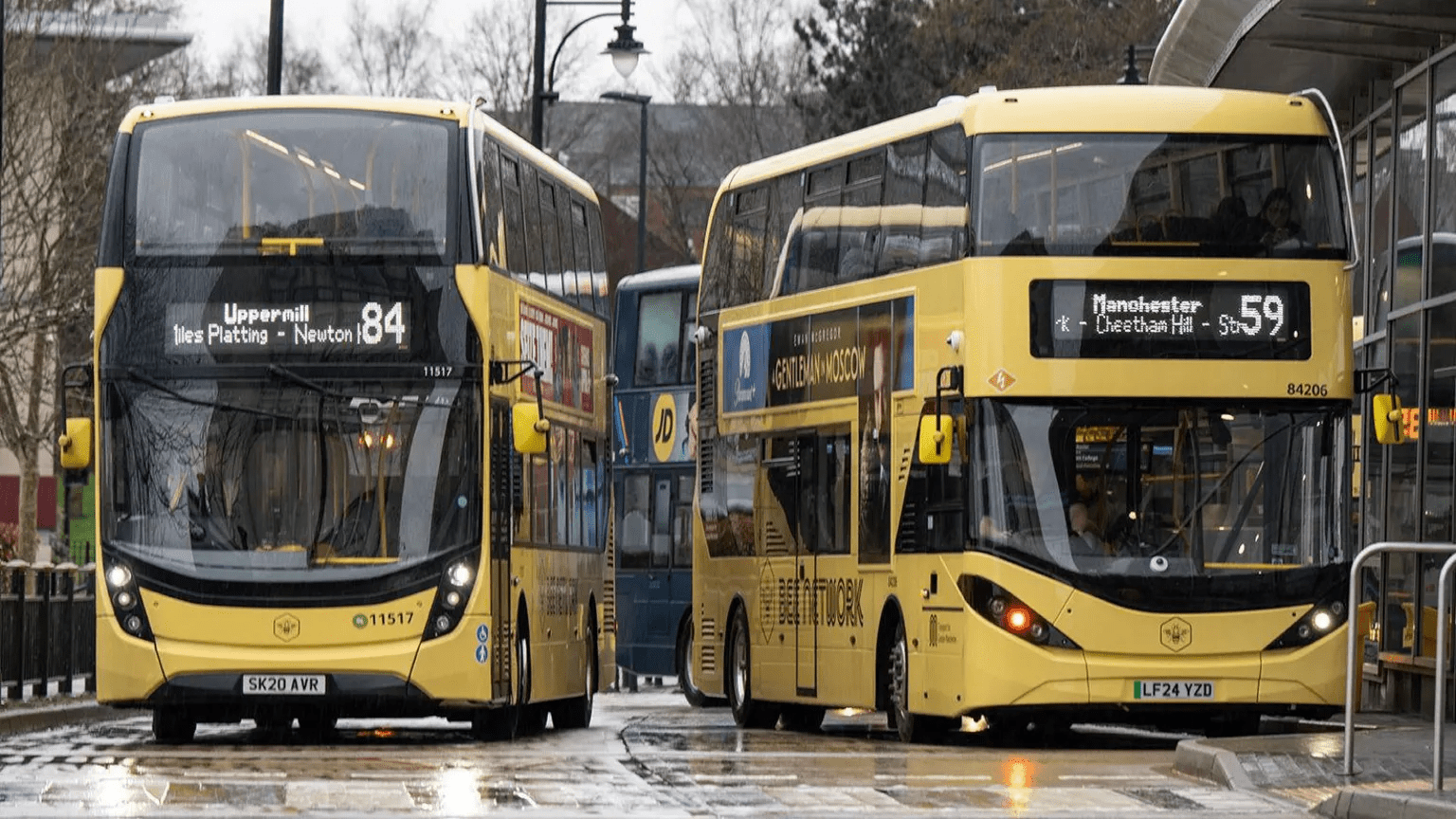
Bee Network buses in Greater Manchester's Oldham Interchange.

Manchester has an extensive bus network of 577 routes (2025), managed by Transport for Greater Manchester, including a night bus service which is one of the most extensive outside London. The bus network had an annual ridership of 145.8 million passengers in 2023.

Manchester was the first council outside London to bring buses back into public control after their deregulation in 1986. The introduction of the Bee Network after a three tranche process in 2025 saw new branding, a new integrated ticketing system, and new vehicles, along with other improvements, being brought to Greater Manchester's bus system.

== Waterborne ==
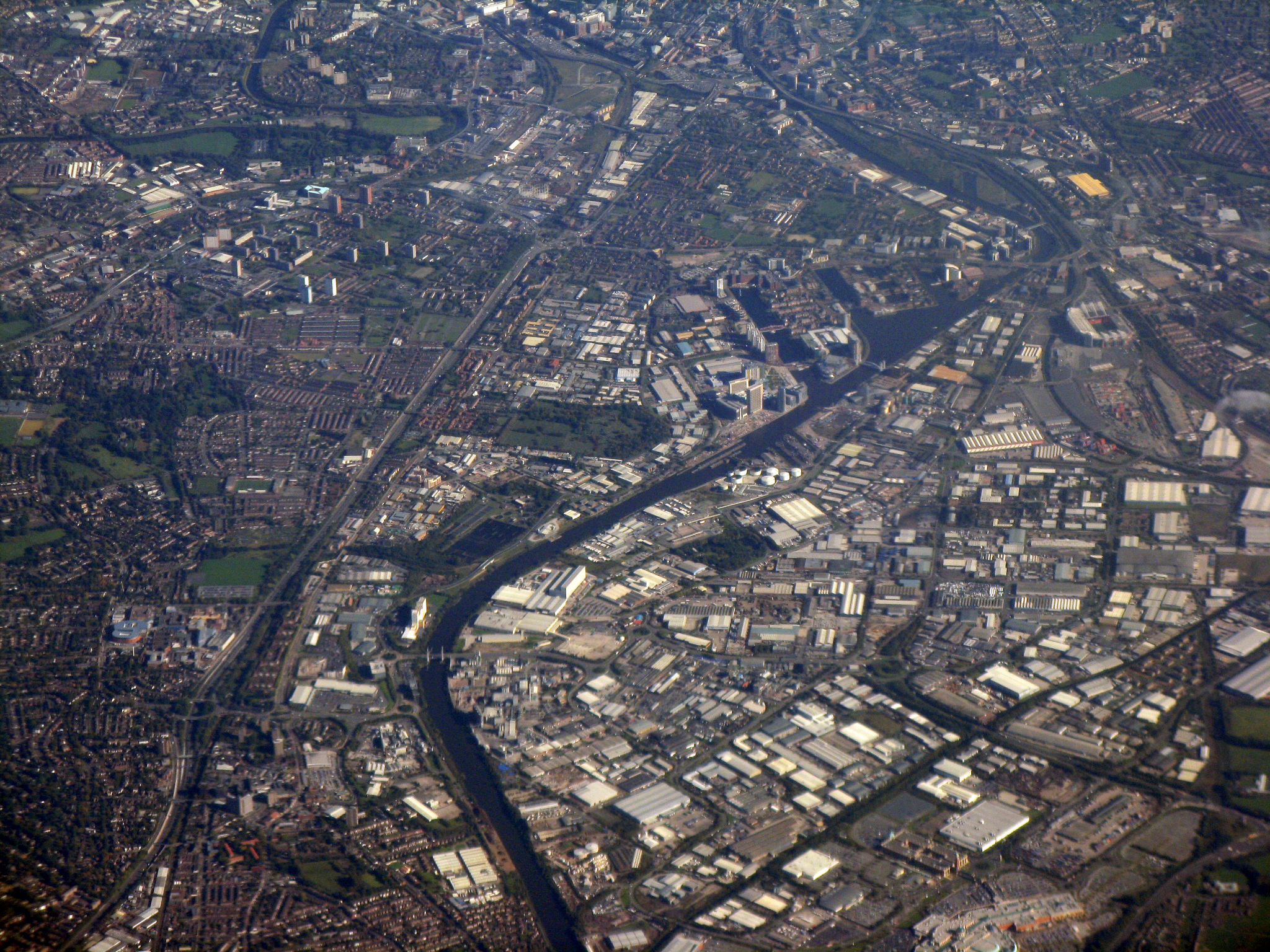
An aerial image of the Manchester Ship Canal converging in Salford and Trafford, just outside Manchester boundaries

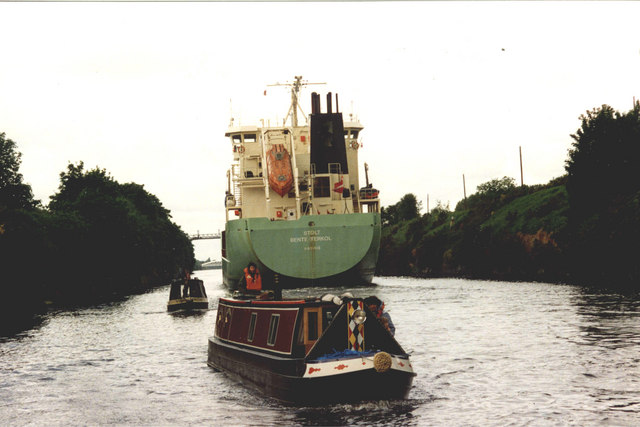
A freight ship and a narrowboat on the Ship Canal.

One legacy of the industrial revolution is an extensive network of canals: the Manchester, Bolton & Bury Canal, Rochdale Canal, Bridgewater Canal, Ashton Canal, and the Leigh Branch of the Leeds & Liverpool Canal. Most of these canals were constructed for transporting commodities such as coal and iron at a time when vehicular transport was not present. Most of these canals are now used for recreation.

The Manchester Ship Canal is the only purpose built-ship canal in the United Kingdom, and upon opening in 1894 was the largest ship navigation canal in the world allowing for ships with a length of up to 600 feet to navigate its 36-mile route. The deteriorating state of the Irwell Mersey Navigation and the excessive dues charged by the Port of Liverpool fuelled influential Mancunian businessmen such as Daniel Adamson to find a solution, and consequently the idea of a ship canal was formed. The ship canal never became the success its patrons had wished, and traffic peaked in the 1960s. The canal fell into a state of disrepair, but since the 1990s there has been renewed efforts to use the canal more as a transport route. Freight is once again being carried on the canal. The ship canal is also used for leisure, and a scheme to use canal and River Irwell as a waterway to transport commuters has also been envisaged. A trip from MediaCityUK at Salford Quays to Spinningfields in Manchester city centre it is hoped would take 15 to 20 minutes. Manchester Water Taxis ran boats from the Trafford Centre and Old Trafford to the city centre, taking around an hour from the Trafford centre to the city centre and 20 minutes from Old Trafford to the city centre. These came to an end in June 2018, with the company citing a lack of proper landings for customers putting people off

== Proposed ==
=== Underground metro ===
An underground system does not exist in Manchester but there was a proposal to create an underground system in the 1970s. The Picc-Vic tunnel was proposed to link Piccadilly and Victoria stations with a number of stations between both. The proposal was shelved due to cost and was deemed impractical with Manchester's network of tunnels and building basements from the Victorian era creating construction difficulties. The Guardian exchange which doubles up as a nuclear bunker also has a series of interconnected tunnels running under Manchester which total over six miles in length and 60 metres (180 feet) in depth in certain areas.

Excavation work under the Manchester Arndale for this project began in the 1970s, but was soon abandoned due to costs and rumours of 'subterranean obstacles'. Other abandoned tunnels hidden for decades have recently been discovered including a 460-metre canal tunnel from the River Irwell to the canal system

== Manchester public transportation statistics ==
The average amount of time people spend commuting with public transit in Manchester, for example to and from work, on a weekday is 89 min. 31% of public transit riders, ride for more than 2 hours every day. The average amount of time people wait at a stop or station for public transit is 18 min, while 28.% of riders wait for over 20 minutes on average every day. The average distance people usually ride in a single trip with public transit is 7.2 km, while 12% travel for over 12 km in a single direction.

== See also ==
- Cycling in Manchester
- Free buses in Greater Manchester
- Category:Transport in Greater Manchester
- Category:History of transport in Greater Manchester
