= Transport Innovation Fund =

The Transport Innovation Fund (TIF) was a transport funding mechanism in England, that has been replaced by the Urban Challenge Fund in March 2010. Its creation was announced by Her Majesty's Government in the July 2004 White Paper, ’The Future of Transport’. The fund had two strands for supporting different types of project: Congestion TIF where local authorities bid for funds for their own schemes; and Productivity TIF where the DfT would identify schemes of national importance.

TIF represented a new approach by the Department for Transport (DfT) to allocating some of its budget for England. The fund did not apply to Scotland, Wales or Northern Ireland but they would not lose out because the budget for the fund will come from England’s overall allocation, calculated by a mechanism known as the Barnett formula.

== Congestion TIF schemes ==
The DfT was looking for packages that combine demand management with a coherent anti-congestion strategy. Demand management is a euphemism for increasing the cost of commuting by car to levels above those of public transport, thus reducing the demand for road space. They were most likely to fund packages that involve demand management through road pricing but they may "by exception, be prepared to consider bids involving a Workplace Parking Levy".

== Bidders ==
Preparing a bid to the fund would be very expensive, so as a first stage the DfT asked for bids for pump priming funds to pay for the research that would be needed to prepare a full bid. In July 2005, Alistair Darling announced that of the 21 groups bidding for pump priming funding, the following eight had been successful:

- Bristol City Council, Bath and North East Council, North Somerset Council and South Gloucestershire Council £1,495k
- Cambridgeshire £385k. This bid included development of many major roads within Cambridge, over 85 kilometres (53 mi) of new cycle paths, and the implementation of congestion charging if congestion does not decrease.
- Durham County Council (for Durham City) £300k
- Leeds City Council and Metro. Application amount to be confirmed.
- Manchester congestion charge and Greater Manchester Transport Innovation Fund £1,250k
- Shropshire County Council (for Shrewsbury) £480k
- Tyne and Wear £950k
- West Midlands conurbation £2600k

== Size of the Fund ==
The TIF was to be worth about £9.5bn over seven years, of which about £1.4bn (£200m a year) would be available for Congestion TIF.

08/09	09/10	10/11	11/12	12/13	13/14	14/15
£290m	£600m	£930m	£1300m	£1680m	£2100m	£2550m

== Other transport funding mechanisms ==
In the UK, spending on transport is too large for local authorities to raise the required revenue from local taxes. Instead, they obtain funds from central government through a number of mechanisms. For a large scheme, an authority must prepare a major scheme business case (MSBC). In this context, a large scheme is defined as one costing more than £5m. Authorities fund schemes costing less than £5m through The Local Transport Settlement. The size of their settlement is derived from a formula that relates the funding to a number of factors including population. However, the budget calculated from the formula is modified to account for the DfT’s assessment of the authority’s Local Transport Plan (LTP) and the authority’s record of delivering the elements of their previous plan. Over the period 2006 to 2011, Greater Manchester, a conurbation with a population of about 2.55 million, will receive a settlement of just under £50m a year

== Size of TIF compared to other funding mechanisms ==
Although TIF funding was to be smaller in total than the Local Transport Settlement, it will be shared between fewer authorities, so for an individual authority it would represent a very large amount of funding. In 2007/8, the Local Transport Settlement will be £1,254m shared by all the authorities in the country. TIF was to be worth about £290m of which £200m will be available to Congestion TIF. According to the Manchester Evening News "The Association of Greater Manchester Authorities wants £1.2bn … virtually all of the £1.4bn currently due to be dished out". So Greater Manchester's bid for TIF funding (£200 m a year) is roughly four times the size of its Local Transport Settlement (£50m a year).
