= Greater Manchester Research, Information and Planning Unit =

The Greater Manchester Research, Information and Planning Unit (GMRIPU), later also known as Greater Manchester Research (GMR), was a staffed research, statistical and information unit serving Greater Manchester, England. It produced and collated demographic, economic, employment, housing and other statistical information concerning the metropolitan county and its ten constituent districts, and provided library and information services to local government across the city region.

The unit operated on behalf of the Association of Greater Manchester Authorities (AGMA) and was hosted within Oldham Metropolitan Borough Council, from where its publications were issued. It was one of the county-wide units through which information, intelligence and strategic research continued to be produced at Greater Manchester level following the abolition of the Greater Manchester County Council in 1986. It was based in Metropolitan House, Hobson Street, Oldham OL1 1QD.

== History ==
The Local Government Act 1985 abolished the metropolitan county councils of England, including the Greater Manchester County Council, with effect from 1986. The ten district councils of Greater Manchester established AGMA as a voluntary county-wide association, and a number of specialist county functions were retained as joint units hosted by individual districts on behalf of all ten authorities. GMRIPU continued the county-level research, intelligence and information functions previously associated with the county council, hosted by Oldham Council.

By the mid-1990s the unit was using the shortened name GMR (Greater Manchester Research) on some publications.

County-level policy and research capacity subsequently developed through other bodies: an AGMA Policy and Research Unit, later restyled the Greater Manchester Integrated Support Team, the Commission for the New Economy (New Economy), and, from 2011, the Greater Manchester Combined Authority (GMCA), whose Research Team GMCA describes as formerly New Economy.

== Activities ==
=== Research and statistics ===
GMRIPU collected, analysed and published statistical information about Greater Manchester. Its work included labour-market analysis, unemployment statistics, demographic information, housing and land-use research, Census information, and district and ward profiles.

=== Census and small-area data ===
The unit maintained or provided access to detailed small-area Census data. Research undertaken for the Greater Manchester Passenger Transport Executive in the early 1990s recorded that GMRIPU supplied 1981 Census Small Area Statistics for areas surrounding railway stations. Variables requested included resident population, social class, car ownership, economic activity and usual mode of travel to work.

The same study reported that GMRIPU did not make Census of Employment information available to the researchers, and that neither GMRIPU nor the Greater Manchester Transportation Unit held some journey-to-work origin and destination information in readily accessible form. The researchers commented on difficulties obtaining Census information despite contemporary developments in geographic information systems.

=== Library and information services ===
In addition to its statistical work, the unit ran a Library and Information Service for local government in Greater Manchester. Its services included general and specialist news monitoring, press-cuttings circulation, database compilation, and current awareness services for officers and members of the district councils and joint authorities.

== Publications ==
GMRIPU produced a series of regular and occasional statistical publications. Publications issued in 1991 include:

- Monthly Unemployment Bulletin
- Employment Trends in Greater Manchester 1990
- Labour Supply Monitor 1991
- Quarterly Unemployment Bulletin
- The Relative Performance of the Small Business Sector for Greater Manchester 1980–89.

A further Quarterly Unemployment Bulletin is recorded for 1993.

The unit also undertook work relating to strategic housing and planning. A 1988 study by J. Findlay and A. Bourke, Joint Housing Land Availability Studies – The Greater Manchester Experience, was published by the unit.

Under the abbreviated name GMR, the unit published Greater Manchester: Facts and Trends in association with AGMA during the 1990s. A bibliographical source records the 1996 edition as "GMR (GM Research, Information and Planning Unit), Greater Manchester: Facts and Trends, Oldham, AGMA", and an academic source cites a 1995 edition published in Oldham by GMR.

== Local information ==
GMRIPU produced statistical profiles at district and ward level. Research concerning the development of information-society initiatives in Salford, for example, used 1991 Census figures reported in a Salford District and Ward Profile compiled by the unit.

The unit's data provided an evidence base used by local government, transport planning and academic researchers examining economic and social conditions within Greater Manchester.

== Archives and library holdings ==
As grey literature issued by a joint local government unit, GMRIPU publications were distributed principally to local authorities, libraries and researchers rather than through commercial channels, and surviving copies are dispersed across library and archive collections. Academic planners and geographers embedded the unit's findings into their peer-reviewed research, for example academic staff at the University of Manchester's Department of Planning and Landscape co-authored papers with GMRIPU analysts and cited their internal datasets.

Copies of the unit's publications are held in local studies collections within Greater Manchester, including at Oldham Local Studies and Archives, in the borough that hosted the unit, and in the local studies and social sciences collections of Manchester Central Library. Records and publications of Greater Manchester's county-wide bodies more generally are collected by the Archives+ service based at Manchester Central Library, incorporating the Greater Manchester County Record Office, and are discoverable through the GM Lives archives catalogue covering family, community, organisational and local authority archives across the county.

The unit's publications are also recorded in the bibliographies of academic works on unemployment, urban sustainability, housing strategy and environmental accounting, and working papers documenting the use of GMRIPU data are held in university repositories, including White Rose Research Online (Universities of Leeds, Sheffield and York).

== Related Greater Manchester joint units ==
GMRIPU was one of several specialist county-wide units retained as shared Greater Manchester services after 1986, each hosted by a district council or university on behalf of the ten authorities. Unlike GMRIPU, some of these units continue to operate:

- The Greater Manchester Ecology Unit (GMEU), hosted by Tameside Metropolitan Borough Council, continues to provide ecological and nature conservation advice to the ten districts.
- The Greater Manchester Archaeological Unit (GMAU), based at the University of Manchester, maintained the county Sites and Monuments Record from 1980. GMAU closed in the early 2010s and was succeeded by the Greater Manchester Archaeological Advisory Service (GMAAS), hosted by the University of Salford and funded by AGMA and later the GMCA.
- A Minerals and Waste Planning Unit is hosted by the GMCA.

== Legacy ==
The work undertaken by GMRIPU / GM Research anticipated the increasingly extensive use of small-area statistics, geographic information systems and metropolitan-level economic intelligence in Greater Manchester.

Research and economic analysis are now undertaken at Greater Manchester level by the GMCA Research Team. GMCA describes this team as formerly New Economy and states that it has developed analytical tools used in areas including employment, health, housing, social services and economic policy.
