= Grindon =

Grindon may refer to:

== Places ==
- Grindon, County Durham, England
- Grindon, Northumberland, a location in England
- Grindon, Sunderland, Tyne and Wear, England
- Grindon, Staffordshire, England

== Other ==
- Leopold Hartley Grindon
- Rosa E. Grindon
