= Judith Barry =

American artist, writer, and educator

- Born: 1954 (age 71–72); Columbus, Ohio, U.S.
- Education: University of California, Berkeley, New York Institute of Technology
- Known for: Installation art, video, multimedia, performance, exhibition design, writing
- Awards: Guggenheim Fellowship, Anonymous Was A Woman Award, Kiesler Prize, National Endowment for the Arts
- Website: Judith Barry

Judith Barry, Imagination, dead imagine, Installation: 5 channel video-sound projection, 10' x 10' x 10', 1991/2018.

Judith Barry (born 1954) is an American multimedia artist, writer and educator. Art critics regard her as a pioneer in performance art, video, electronic media and installation art who has contributed significantly to feminist theories of subjectivity and the exploration of public constructions of gender and identity. Her work draws on a diverse background, which includes studies in critical theory and cinema, dance, and training in architecture, design and computer graphics. Rather than employ a signature style, Barry combines multiple disciplines and mediums in immersive, research-based works whose common methodology calls into question technologies of representation and the spatial languages of film, urbanism and the art experience. Critic Kate Linker wrote, "Barry has examined the effects and ideological functions of images in and on society. Her installations and writings … have charted the transformation of representation by different 'machines' of image production, from the spatial ensembles of theater to computer and electronic technologies."

Barry's work belongs to the collections of the Museum of Modern Art (MoMA), Centre Pompidou, MACBA (Museo de Arte Contemporáneo de Barcelona) MUMOK (Austria), and Kanal, among others. She has exhibited at MoMA, Museum of Contemporary Art, Los Angeles, Institute of Contemporary Arts (London), the New Museum, Institute of Contemporary Art, Boston, Documenta, and the biennales of Berlin, Sharjah, Sydney, Venice and the Whitney Museum, among other venues. Barry has received a Guggenheim Fellowship, Frederick and Lillian Kiesler Prize and Anonymous Was A Woman Award. She is based in New York and is a professor and in the MIT Program in Art, Culture and Technology.

== Early life and career ==
Barry was born in 1954 in Columbus, Ohio. She pursued early interests in architecture and dance after moving to the San Francisco Bay Area in 1974. She studied architecture and cinema at the University of California at Berkeley while also exploring dance, performance art and video—then-marginal art forms that offered greater opportunities to women. In the latter 1970s, she was active in modern dance companies and feminist art collectives in San Francisco and at the Woman's Building in Los Angeles.

Barry's performance works engaged themes involving voyeurism and women's role as subject and object of the erotic gaze. They often situated her own body as the site of conceptual and visual experiment. After pushing her art toward installation, she moved to New York in the 1980s, continuing her work in exhibition design, multimedia and new digital technologies. In 1987, she earned an MA in communication arts and computer graphics from the New York Institute of Technology.

== Work and critical reception ==
Barry's work has links to conceptual art, feminist performance art, critical theory and cinema studies. In addition to multimedia installations, video, exhibition design and performance, she has produced sculpture, photography, graphic and drawing projects. She frequently engages viewers through visually immersive environments employing new technologies. Her formal strategies draw upon critical analysis, architectural form and cinematic spectacle to consider subjects such as the body, perception, language, and the role of urban planning and visual technologies in shaping identity, gender and social paradigms.

Critics define Barry's practice as much in relation to cultural theory and methodology as through aesthetic issues. Brian Wallis wrote that unlike the work of contemporaries delving into gender (e.g., Cindy Sherman or Barbara Kruger), Barry's work is "constantly shifting styles and formats, while consistently probing a series of tough theoretical issues." Among concerns identified are: relationships between display, looking, projection, desire and social control; the influence of architectural space and urban planning on identity, social behavior and power relations; insertion of the corporeal and kinesthetic into visually dominated discourses; insistence on a participatory, meaning-productive spectator; emerging technologies and new configurations of space and social life; and the presentation of underrepresented individual stories and histories.

=== Individual works and installations ===
Judith Barry, Model for Stage and Screen, installation view, 1987.

Visual theorist Johanna Drucker identified "voyeurism, spectacle, the power of display and the seductive apparatus of projection" as central to Barry's work—themes evident in her early video, Casual Shopper (1981–82). An historical analogue to Walter Benjamin's Arcades Project, it mapped the transformation of the arcade into the synthetic space of the contemporary shopping mall. Barry's protagonist was a counterpart to Benjamin's male flaneur (roughly, "stroller")—a female flaneuse whose aimless attention to goods and an elusive man control the narrative and action, counter to the traditional dominance of the male gaze theorized by Laura Mulvey. Critics linked the work's use of montage, persistent browsing and endless commercial space to ideas concerning cinema's recycling of unsated desire and the narcissistic pursuit of satisfaction through consumption.

Projection as a metaphor—both its physical sense and the psychological projection of images and fantasies—figured prominently in video installations by Barry that extended the imaginative space of cinema to architectural space, challenging notions of public versus private, and psychic versus social. In the Shadow of the City Vamp r y (Artists Space and Whitney Biennial, 1985) and Echo (MoMA, 1986) considered the redevelopment of urban space and its disconnection from lived experience, shared community and historical grounding, suggesting a failure by modernist architecture to deliver on promises of social liberation. Both large-scale, double-sided projections, they melded imagery of shopping malls and high-rise exteriors and interiors with window-like insertions of fragmented film narratives. Critics suggested that In the Shadow …'s combination of anonymous looking and beckoning views invoked voyeuristic desire in "ceaselessly consuming," vampire-like spectators hungry for images. Echo (referencing the Echo and Narcissus myth) depicted archetypal businessmen trapped and staring out of gridded glass structures that reviewer Andy Grundberg wrote, evoked "the anonymity and anomie of corporate work places, and the narcissism of those who inhabit them."

Judith Barry, Voice Off, Installation: 2 channel video, sound projection, 1999.

Barry's use of contradictory vantage points inside and outside the same physical and visual spaces in those works highlights her emphasis on kinesthetic and perceptual rather than idealized visual paradigms (e.g., perspectival vision) for meaning-making—an approach that often requires spectators to navigate physical parameters and conflicting modes of signification. For example, in Model for Stage and Screen (1987), she considered the functional effects of architecture, asking spectators to step into a large circular chamber containing a glowing pillar of green light. Upon exiting, rather than return to normal vision they experienced a purely perceptual, intense series of afterimages, suspending them between different ways of "seeing." For The Work of the Forest (1992) Barry used three synchronized video tracks on transparent screens to consider the conflicting histories of African art, Art Nouveau and the Belgian Congo; the continuous panorama of imagery undercut the visual coherence of monocular perspective, potentially stimulating multiple subject positions and interpretations. In Voice off (1998–99) she emphasized sound and bodily movement with back-to-back projections of metaphoric narratives: one of a dream-like, possibly imaginary, performance and the other of a male writer haunted by and unable to locate the source of its voices. She employed a scrim on one side of the screen allowing viewers to move between the separated narratives, spatializing the film convention of shot and counter shot, while exploiting the power of suggestion and visualization created through voice and sound.

Imagination, dead imagine (Fundació La Caixa and Nicole Klagsbrun, 1991; Mary Boone Gallery, 2018) emphasized movement, but more insistently, foregrounded a visceral, corporeal "infection" of its own pristine form and exhibition space. The installation consisted of a 10-foot mirrored cube wrapped with four (or five) rear-projection screens depicting a seemingly caged, androgynous head (in frontal, back and profile views) being successively flooded with muck resembling bodily fluids and insects, with each defilement followed by a video wipe restoring a cleansed face. Made at the height of the AIDS crisis and that era's terror of bodily fluids, it referenced work by writers Samuel Beckett and J. G. Ballard, theorist Julia Kristeva's concept of the abject and Robert Morris's minimalist mirrored cubes. Charles Hagen of The New York Times described its narrative dimension as "exploring the charged territory, prominent in infantile psychology, where the erotic and the scatological overlap … as the mammoth, enigmatic head suffers the plague of indignities … with a compelling, almost heroic impassiveness."

Judith Barry, All the light that's ours to see, 2 channel video–sound installation with custom tables, photographs and books, dimensions variable, 2020.

In later works, Barry often considered emerging digital and electronic technologies and the displacement of "real" places, architectural forms and grounded observers in favor of virtual spaces, screens and "users." In Rouen: Touring machines/Intermittent Futures (1993), she combined fiber-optics, the book and video projection to create a shifting cyberspace/fictional guidebook of immaterial images connecting cultures, places, times and literature prompted by the history of Rouen, France. Speedflesh (1998, Wexner Center) was described by curator Sarah Perks as "part computer game, cinematic and narrative inquiry, art installation and immersive experience"; its science-fiction narrative structure explored the digital realm in relation to technologies of the body. For All the light that's ours to see (2020), Barry installed two screens sharing a common vanishing point, using disrupted, cross-cutting narratives to examine the shift from collective cinematic experience to the private, domestic practice of streaming.

=== "Not Reconciled" series and related projects ===
In projects such as Border Stories (2001/2006) and Cairo Stories (2003–11), Barry focused on the narratives of individuals from diverse cultures and their formation in relation to the politics of nation-states. Situated between documentary and drama, these videos and installations developed out of interviews which she translated, edited and re-presented using actors to protect interviewees' anonymity. Border Stories was a site-specific video installation originally projected in the windows of an abandoned San Diego bank with four distinct narratives staged according to a pedestrian's movement down the street; it explored social positioning in urban and domestic space, particularly with regard to class. It was an extension of Barry's earlier installation, Not Reconciled: First and Third (Whitney Biennial, 1987) a series of video portraits examining immigration, migration and race relations in the US. Inserted as hovering talking heads in a darkened stairwell entry using concealed projection apparatus, it called into question the exclusion of certain groups from cultural spaces and narratives of the American dream.

Barry produced differently themed projects in that series in London, Rotterdam, Corsica and Cairo. Cairo Stories (Sharjah Biennial, 2011) was developed collaboratively from video interviews of more than 200 Cairene women of different social and economic classes between the 2003 U.S. invasion of Iraq and the 2011 Egyptian Revolution. The resulting video and photographic portraits chronicled largely untold stories ranging across political hope and empowerment, the complexities of family life and class, and personal hardship.

She took a different approach with Untitled: (Global displacement: nearly 1 in 100 people worldwide are displaced from their homes) (2018), an intricate digital collage displayed as a three-story banner on the façade of the Isabella Stewart Gardner Museum. Prompted by drone photos of people adrift in precarious boats that proliferated during the 2015 European migrant crisis, Barry recast the scenario with images she took of museum goers looking up and smiling, then superimposed a 2016 Pew Center report headline (the title), connecting viewers to people displaced by disasters around the world and in the U.S.

== Exhibition design ==
Since the mid-1980s, Barry has created designs for group and themed exhibitions and her own solo shows, often in collaboration with designer Ken Saylor. Her exhibition design draws upon diverse historical sources: the displays of El Lissitzky, the 1950s British Independent Group and 19th-century natural history museum dioramas, among others. Critics nave noted its subversion of artworld conventions, interactivity, unexpected juxtapositions of art, pop-culture and architectural elements, and influence on institutional critique installation art. Art historian Helmut Draxler wrote that Barry's work positioned "exhibition design as an independent form of artistic practice … put[ting] classical methods of design and visual communication in the service of critical art."

Among prominent shows she designed or co-designed are: "Damaged Goods" (1986), "Malcolm McLaren and the British New Wave" (1988), "From Receiver to Remote Control: the TV Set" (1990) and "alt.youth.media" (1996) at the New Museum; "The Desire of the Museum" (1989, Whitney Museum); "Channeling Spain" (2010, Arts Santa Monica, Barcelona); and the multi-installation survey of her own work, "Judith Barry: Body without Limits" (Domus Artium, 2008; Berardo Museum (2010).

== Writing and teaching ==
Barry's essays, theoretical texts and projects have appeared in anthologies, exhibition catalogues, and art periodicals including Architect's Newspaper, Artforum, Aperture, Art & Text, The Brooklyn Rail, Mousse, October, and REALLIFE Magazine, She contributed the essay "Casual Imagination" to the anthology Blasted Allegories (1987). In 1991, the Institute of Contemporary Arts published a collection of her essays titled, Public Fantasy.

Barry has been a professor in the MIT Program in Art, Culture and Technology since 2017. From 2004 to 2017, she was a professor and director of Lesley University's College of Art & Design. She also taught at Cooper Union and the Merz Akademie in Germany.

== Recognition ==
Barry received a Guggenheim Fellowship (2011), an Anonymous Was A Woman Award (2001) and the Frederick and Lillian Kiesler Prize for Architecture and the Arts (2000). She has been awarded grants from the Daniel Langlois Foundation, National Endowment for the Arts, New York State Council on the Arts, New York Foundation for the Arts, and Art Matters. In 1995 she received a residency in video at the Wexner Center for the Arts, and in 2016, a commission from HOME (UK). She represented the U.S. in the Cairo Biennale in 2001 and received the event's Best Pavilion award.

== Collections ==
Barry's work is held internationally in the public collections of the Centre Pompidou, Cisneros Fontanais Art Foundation (CIFO), Dia Art Foundation, Frac Lorraine, Fundació La Caixa, Generali Foundation (Austria), Hammer Museum, Kadist, MACBA, Museum of Modern Art, Museum of Contemporary Art San Diego, MUMOK, National Gallery of Canada, Netherlands Media Art Institute, Sammlung Goetz, and KANAL - Centre Pompidou, among others.
