= Moutrey =

Moutrey is a surname. Notable people with the surname include:

- Dave Moutrey British arts administrator
- Nick Moutrey (born 1995), Canadian ice hockey player
