= Carbon literacy =

Awareness of climate change and its causes

Carbon Literacy is the awareness of climate change and the climate impacts of humankind's everyday actions. The term has been used in a range of contexts in scientific literature and in casual usage (see Research), but is most associated with The Carbon Literacy Project (CLP).

The Carbon Literacy Project logo

== Definition ==
Carbon Literacy is the knowledge and capacity required to create a positive shift in how humankind lives, works and behaves in response to climate change.

The Carbon Literacy Project defines Carbon Literacy as "an awareness of the carbon costs and impacts of everyday activities and the ability and motivation to reduce emissions, on an individual, community and organisational basis."

To distinguish between the use of the phrase in its abstract sense ('carbon literacy') (e.g.), and its use under the established definition (Carbon Literacy), the phrase is capitalised (e.g.). See Research.

== The Carbon Literacy Project (CLP) ==
The term Carbon Literacy had been used informally on a number of earlier occasions, but began to gain prominence in 2009 when it emerged in the development of the climate change action plan for Manchester, Manchester: A Certain Future.

This citizen-written plan pledged the UK's second largest urban area to:

1. Reduce the city of Manchester's emissions of carbon dioxide by 41% by 2020, from 2005 levels.
2. To engage all individuals, neighbourhoods and organisations in Manchester in a process of cultural change that embeds 'low-carbon thinking' into the lifestyles and operations of the city.

The plan therefore aimed to (i) lower emissions by reducing demand for and use of energy; altering the technologies used for energy generation; and changing the sources of the fuels used from fossil fuels to renewables; and (ii) create a 'low-carbon culture' by building a common understanding of the causes and implications of climate change, and to develop programmes of 'carbon literacy'.

As a collectively written and owned plan, any citizen or organisation could respond to assist in the delivery of aims and objectives, however it took until 2010 before a Manchester-based social enterprise Cooler Projects CIC took up the challenge of delivery of the Carbon Literacy objective: "...every resident, pupil, student and employee [in the city] will have had at least one day's training in climate change…probably several by 2020.

In 2011, Cooler convened a voluntary 30-person working group drawn from all sectors who, working collectively, created a definition for the term, and established requirements for a day's training to meet that definition. These requirements formed the basis of The Carbon Literacy Standard. The Standard was based on the key premise that if humankind is to cut carbon emissions by the kind of reduction targets demanded by science, we will need to change our culture as well as our technology.

In 2012, Cooler began to pilot its approach with schools, workplaces, and communities. It quickly established a not for profit initiative - The Carbon Literacy Project - initially in Manchester but rapidly beyond, to oversee the delivery of training to meet the Standard, and certifying successful participants as "Carbon Literate". In the same year the Association of Greater Manchester Authorities (AGMA) (which includes Manchester), established Carbon Literacy as one of the four aims of the Greater Manchester Climate Change Strategy.

In 2014, the Project was incorporated as a registered charity (a legal not-for-profit structure in the UK) The Carbon Literacy Trust (registered charity No.1156722) so that the concept of Carbon Literacy and its IP could be delivered in perpetuity, for the public good.

In 2015, The Carbon Literacy Project was selected from a global field to be part of the Transformative Actions Program (TAP) at the UN Climate Change summit (COP21) in Paris, December 2015. The Carbon Literacy Project is therefore formally recognised as one of the top 100 responses the world has to offer in order to tackle climate change.

In 2015, Councillor Jeff Smith became the first Carbon Literate MP.

in 2016, The Carbon Literacy Project introduced an accreditation scheme called the Carbon Literate Organisation (CLO) accreditation.

== Carbon Literate Organisation (CLO) ==
The Carbon Literate Organisation (CLO) accreditation and associated CLO Standard were designed and launched by The Carbon Literacy Project (2016) in order to provide a visible 'badge' that showcases an organisation as (i) committed to Carbon Literacy (CL), (ii) having a substantial number of people who are Carbon Literate, and (iii) having a commitment to support its Carbon Literate people and maintain its low carbon culture. An organisation uses this status to better interact with its communities–whether they are staff or customers, neighbours, learners, suppliers or stakeholders. The four tiers of accreditation (Bronze, Silver, Gold, Platinum) ensures distinction between organisations showing differing levels of commitment.

Worldwide to date, fourteen organisations are registered as Carbon Literate Organisations (CLOs), including The University of Manchester, Manchester Museum and Northwards Housing.

== Research ==
The use of the term 'carbon literacy' is increasingly widespread in everyday language and scientific literature, and includes (i) research that specifically evaluates Carbon Literacy and The Carbon Literacy Project, and (ii) the use of the term 'carbon literacy' in a more abstract sense.

Behavioural responses to climate change are limited due to the uncertainty and complexity associated with the subject. Current research focuses on the need for societal engagement in the mitigation of climate change, through an increase of understanding amongst citizens, organisations, schools and public bodies due to the uncertainty and complexity associated with the subject. Dissemination of Carbon Literacy (CL) training (which includes the causes and consequences of carbon emissions, and an understanding of the power of individual action) has been shown to qualitatively influence positive behaviour change with regard to reducing carbon footprints. Following CL training, energy and carbon-saving behaviour (including both individual and collective actions) has been shown to increase, including evidence of the 'cascade effect'–where participants discussed CL with family, friends or colleagues. In Greater Manchester CL is being disseminated to those that live (via housing associations), those that work (BBC, Media City, Peel Media, ITV, Dock10, local authorities, Groundwork, Greater Manchester Fire and Rescue) and those that study (University of Manchester, Manchester Metropolitan University).

Other studies conducted over the last two decades refer to the abstract concept of 'carbon literacy', and its importance in low-carbon behaviour change. For example, Horng et al. looked into the development of low carbon choices in the Taiwanese tourism industry, and Teng et al. found that 'carbon literacy' significantly improves low-carbon behaviour in the hospitality industry in Taiwan. Studies have also focussed on 'carbon literacy practices' in children's construction of knowledge about climate change. Here, significantly higher levels of climate change knowledge and understanding were found in pupils from 'eco-schools' as opposed to 'non-eco-schools', indicating the importance of Carbon Literacy within community settings to facilitate culture change.

== See also ==
- Global warming
- Carbon dioxide
- Greenhouse gas
- Greenhouse effect
- Effects of global warming on oceans
- Environmental impact of the coal industry
- Geologic temperature record
- Glossary of climate change
- History of climate change science
- Index of climate change articles
- Scientific opinion on climate change
