= HOME (Manchester) =

Arts centre in Manchester, England

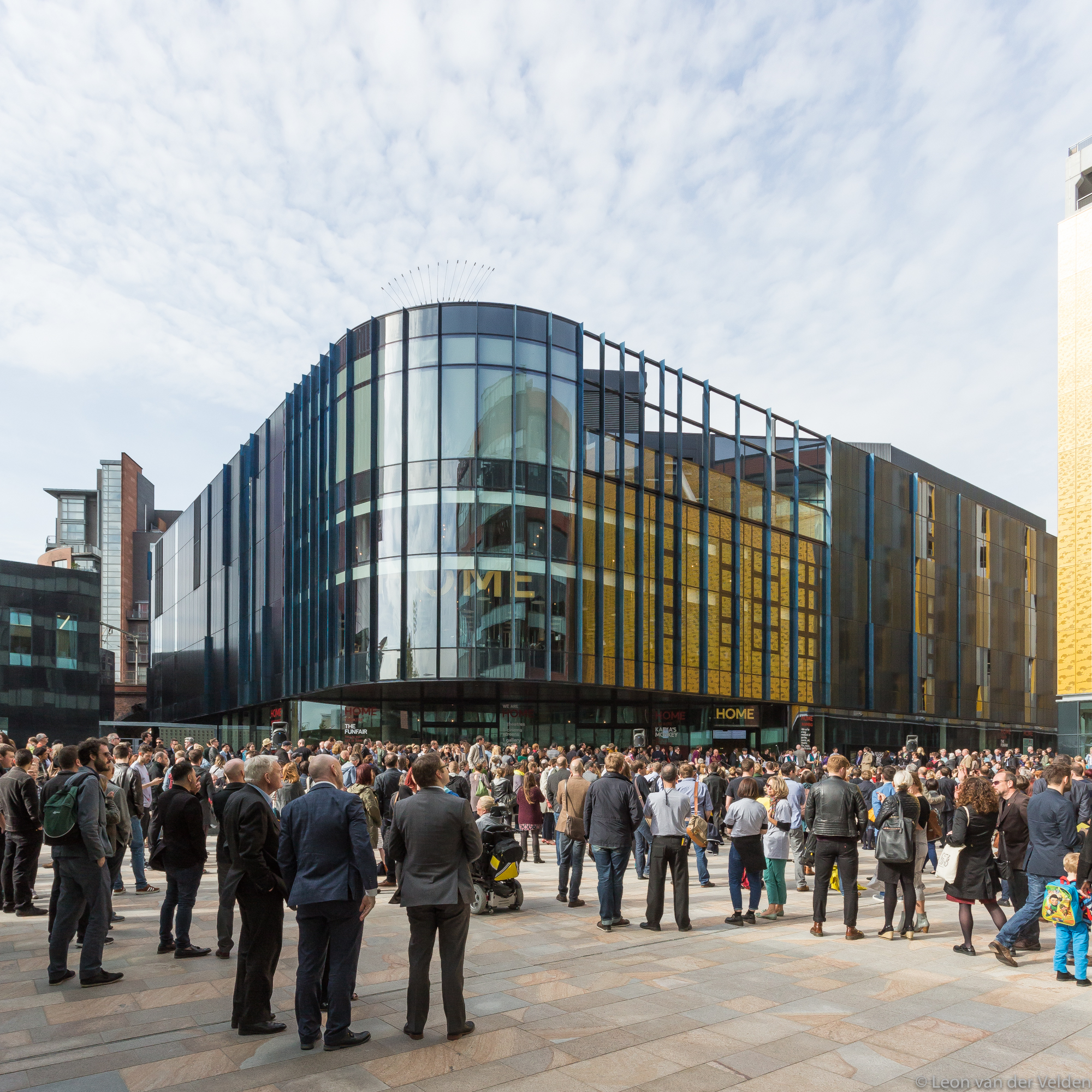
- HOME seen from Tony Wilson Square

General information
- Type: Arts center; Cinema; Theatre
- Location: First Street, Manchester, Greater Manchester, England
- Coordinates: 53.4736°N 2.2467°W
- Construction started: 2013
- Completed: 24 April 2015
- Inaugurated: 21 May 2015
- Cost: £25 million

Design and construction
- Architect: Mecanoo

Website
- homemcr.org

HOME is an arts centre, cinema and theatre complex in Manchester, England. With five cinemas, two theatres and 500 m^{2} (5,400 sq ft) of gallery space, it is one of the few arts organisations to commission, produce and present work across film, theatre and visual art.

== History ==
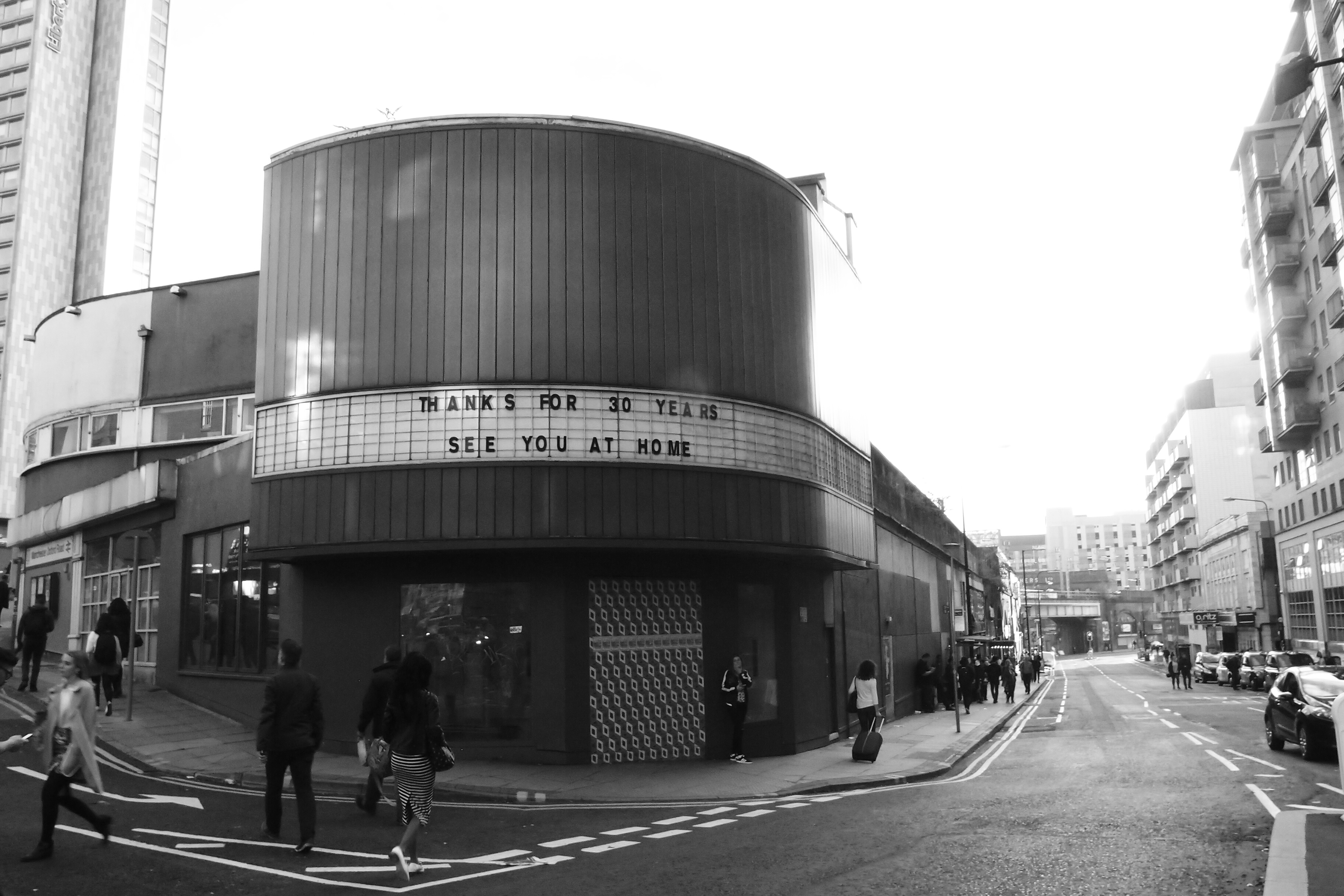
Cornerhouse in September 2016

The centre was formed by the merger of two Manchester-based arts organisations, Cornerhouse and the Library Theatre Company.

The project was funded by Manchester City Council, the Garfield Weston Foundation and Arts Council England. HOME operates under a service contract with Manchester City Council to provide social benefit to the community.

The project was overseen by Dave Moutrey, former director and chief executive of Cornerhouse, with Sarah Perks as artistic director for visual arts, Jason Wood as artistic director for film and Walter Meierjohann as artistic director for theatre.

The Library Theatre occupied most of the basement of Manchester Central Library and was the home of the Library Theatre Company, a Manchester City Council service. The library was built in 1934 and the theatre was originally a lecture theatre that since 1952 had been used by the theatre company. From 2010, the Library Theatre Company began performing at The Lowry arts centre in Salford. From 2014, it began operating as part of HOME before moving into the arts centre in May 2015.

In 2014, filmmaker Danny Boyle became a patron, along with actress and comedian Meera Syal, director Nicholas Hytner, novelist and poet Jackie Kay, filmmaker Asif Kapadia, actress Suranne Jones, artist Phil Collins and visual artist Rosa Barba.

== Buildings ==
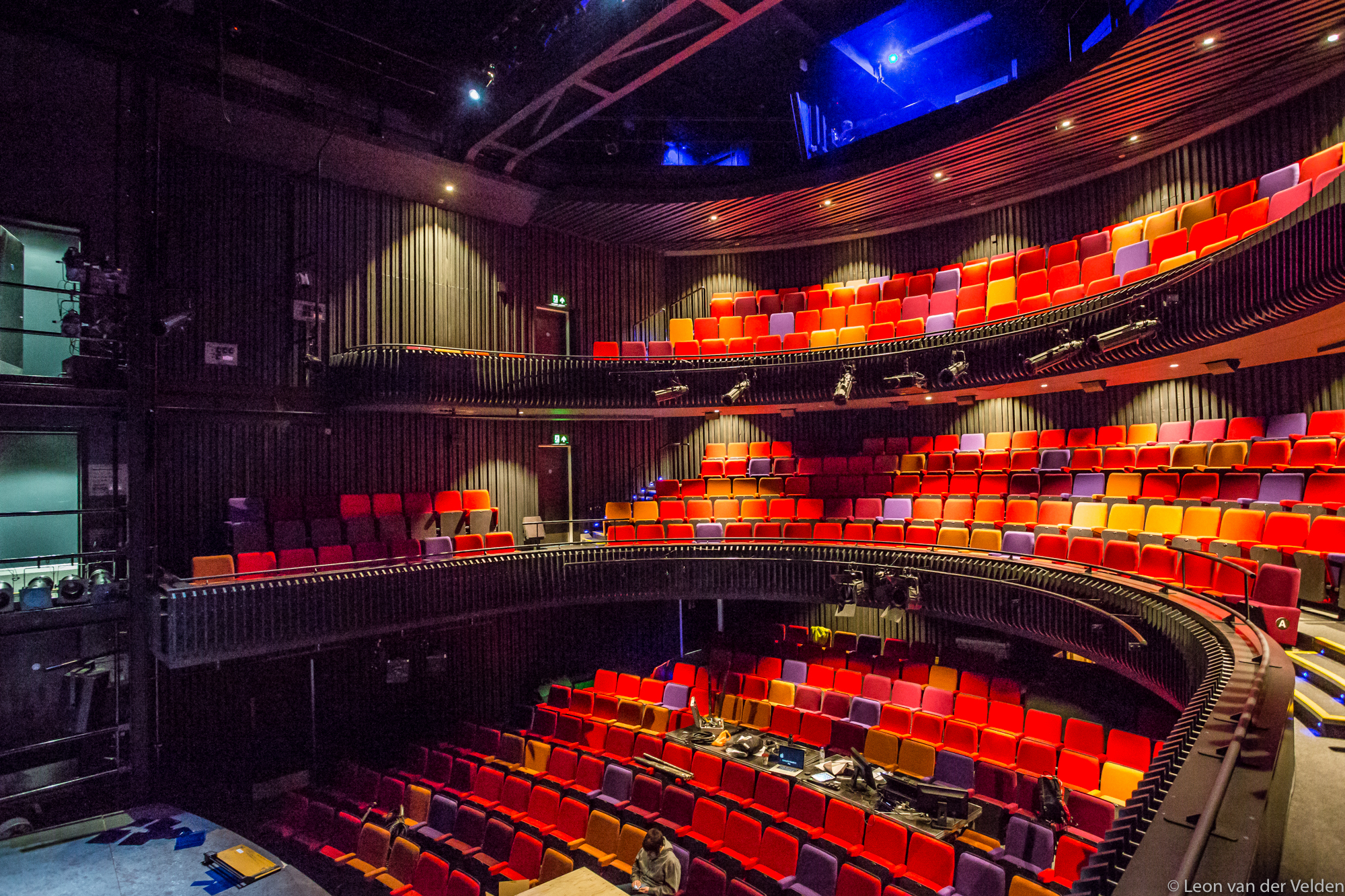
Main theatre

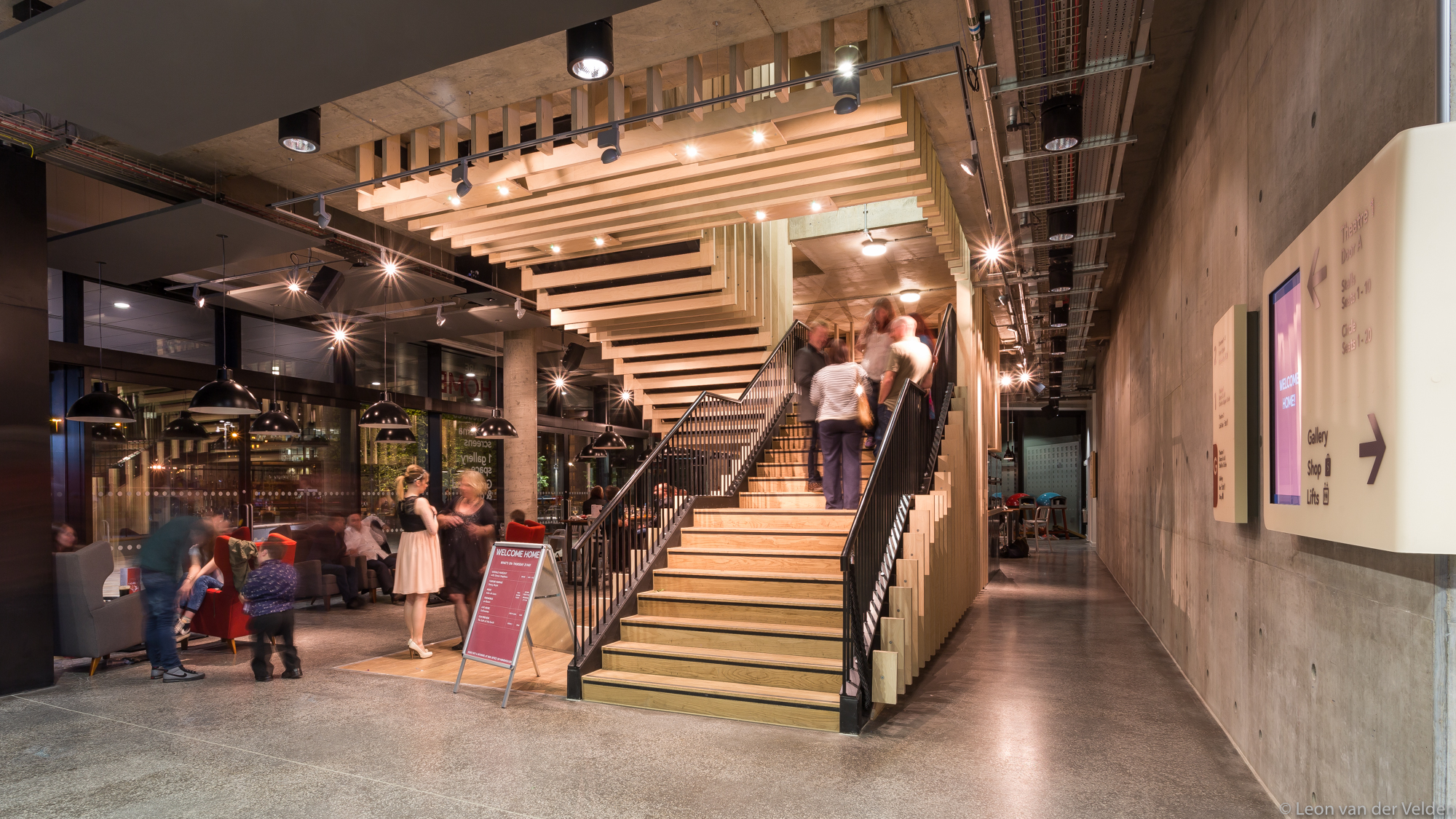
Foyer

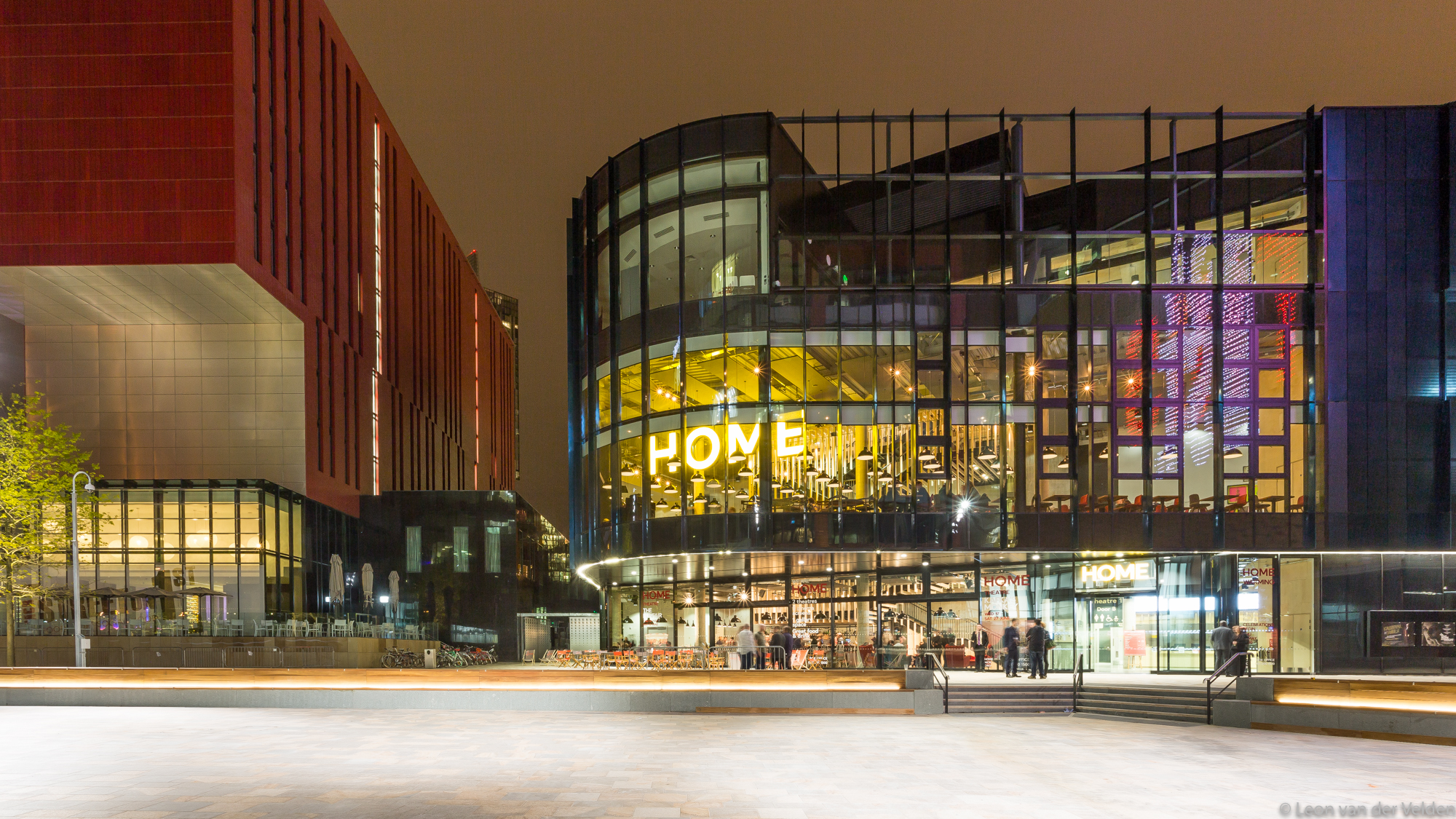
Exterior

HOME occupies a site on First Street, Manchester. There are two performance venues—a 500-seat theatre and 150-seat flexible studio space—five cinema screens, gallery space to display contemporary art, café bar and restaurant.

The centre is part of the development of a creative quarter in the city. The arts centre was designed by Mecanoo Architects based in Delft, Netherlands.

== Operations ==
HOME is an Arts Council England National Portfolio Organisation, registered as "Greater Manchester Arts Centre Limited" with the Charity Commission for England and Wales.

In 2019, HOME was one of the most popular attractions in Manchester with c. 900,000 visits, and Lonely Planet voted it one of the top 500 experiences in the UK ("one of Britain's best arts centres"). In 2021, HOME was named in the top 10 of TimeOut's 50 Best Cinemas in the UK and Ireland.

HOME welcomes over 650,000 visits per year with an annual programme that typically features over 10,000 events including:

- 6,500 cinema screenings
- 350 theatre performances
- 20 exhibitions
- 3,500 sessions through engagement, participation and talent development

HOME works with international and UK artists to produce work including drama, dance, film and contemporary visual art with a strong focus on Manchester, international work, new commissions, education, informal learning and talent development.

HOME trains all staff to be carbon literacy champions, as well as undertaking a range of activities to reduce environmental impacts, winning the award for 'Promotion of Environmental Sustainability' at the Manchester Culture Awards 2019.

In April 2024, HOME cancelled, and then re-instated, an event entitled Voices of Resilience, featuring Palestinian writing and poetry and readings by Kingsley Ben-Adir, Maxine Peake, Kamila Shamsie and Shamshad Khan amongst others. Citing "recent publicity and security concerns" as rationale for cancellation, over 300 artists and cultural workers wrote to demand HOME reconsider their stance. The event was held 22 April 2024 without incident.
