= Dave Moutrey =

British arts administrator

Dave Moutrey is a British arts administrator. Since March 2024 he has been Director of Culture and Creative Industries for Manchester City Council, responsible for implementing the council's cultural strategy.

In July 2010 Moutrey was awarded an Honorary Doctorate by the University of Salford in recognition of his decades of work supporting young people’s entry into the arts and socially engaged arts practice. In June 2022 he was awarded an OBE in the Queen’s Platinum Jubilee Honours list for services to culture especially during Covid.

He is a BAFTA member, a Fellow of the RSA and a member of the Chartered Management Institute.

== Career ==
Previously, he was Director and Chief Executive of HOME, the Manchester centre for international contemporary arts, theatre and film which opened in 2015 formed by the merger of Cornerhouse and the Library Theatre Company. At that time Dave was also Director of Culture for the City of Manchester, a role that he performed concurrently with his position as Director and CEO of HOME.

Moutrey was Chief Executive of Arts About Manchester from 1990-1998, before joining Cornerhouse as Chief Executive and Director; prior to these roles, Moutrey was the manager of the Abraham Moss Theatre.

In 2016 Moutrey joined the British Council Arts Advisory Group for 6 years and the Board of the Traverse Theatre in Edinburgh in 2017. In early 2022 he was appointed Chair of the Theatres Trust.

He is also a qualified drama teacher and a strong advocate for the importance of the arts in education and wider society. He also stated in an interview that he'd like to take theatre pioneer and suffragette Annie Horniman for a pie and a pint. When asked why he does what he does, he stated that 'I do enjoy it, I believe it has a purpose [...] there is no better drug than seeing an audience of one or thousands have their lives changed in some very small way by an artwork that you have helped create the space for'.
