= Rosa E. Grindon =

British actress, suffragist and writer

Rosa E. Grindon L.L.A.
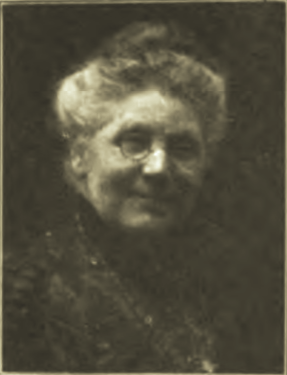
- Born: Rosa Elverson; 1848; Newhall, Derbyshire
- Died: May 1923 (aged 74–75); Manchester
- Monuments: Medallion likeness and Shakespeare window at Manchester Central Library
- Education: Cheltenham Ladies' College
- Occupations: Activist, suffragist, writer, lecturer
- Organization: Manchester Shakespeare Tercentenary Association (founder)
- Spouse: Leopold Hartley Grindon (m. 1893)

Rosa Grindon (née Elverson; 1848 – 6 May 1923) was a British activist, suffragist, and writer on Shakespeare, who established a national reputation as an authority on the playwright.

== Early life ==
Rosa Elverson was born in the Derbyshire village of Newhall, Derbyshire. In her earlier life, she had a series of domestic roles, including working as a lady’s companion and as a housekeeper.

One employer was the Mayor of Lichfield, John Gilbert, for whom she performed the duties of a Lady Mayoress. With Gilbert’s daughter Florence, she helped transcribe medieval texts for the Early English Text Society.

In 1889, Rosa earned the L.L.A. (Lady Literate in Arts) diploma in English, Botany, Geology, Physiology, and Geography from the University of St Andrews, studying from Cheltenham.

== Marriage and Manchester ==
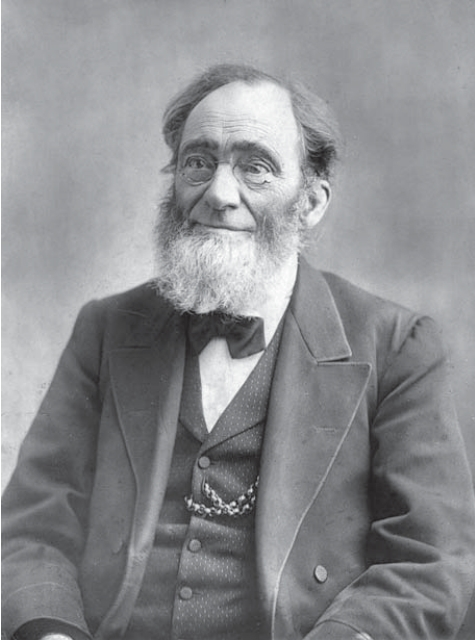
Leopold Hartley Grindon

Rosa Elverson married naturalist Leopold Grindon on 8 August 1893, moving to Manchester to live with him. There, she became active in amateur academic, cultural, and social work, becoming an active member of the Manchester Naturalists’ Society (which Leopold had founded) and the first woman to be elected to its Council.

Grindon was a supporter of women's suffrage, attending meetings of the Manchester Society for Women’s Suffrage, and in 1913 becoming one of its Vice Presidents. On the 1911 census, Grindon gave her occupation as "Lecturer & Suffragette".

She was active as a lecturer, including for the Manchester Geographical Society, the Chester Society of Natural Science, and the Manchester Working Men’s Clubs Association, covering such topics as "the life history of a mountain", "Chaucer as field naturalist", and "the families of common plants". She was a founding member of the Life Study Society (of which she was President for 21 years), the Ladies’ Chess Club, and became President of the Manchester Ladies Literary and Scientific Club (originally formed by Lydia Becker). On her retirement, the Life Study Society was reconstituted as the Rosa Leo Grindon Society.

Grindon was passionated about horticulture, and founded the Leo Grindon Flower Lovers’ Association in memory of her husband, who died in 1904. She also played a leading role in forming the Manchester Tramwaymen’s Horticultural Society.

== Literary activity ==
Grindon was President of the Manchester Ladies’ Shakespeare Reading Club, and established a local and national reputation as a Shakespearean authority. She lectured widely on Shakespeare's plays, including between 1909 and 1913 at the annual Festivals in Stratford-upon-Avon.

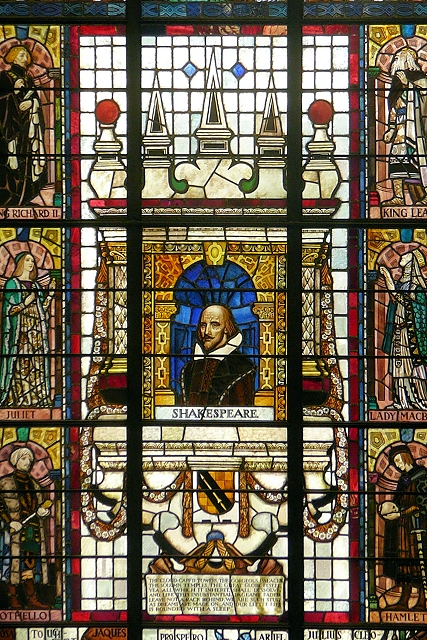
Stained glass window in Manchester Central Library, the bequest of Rosa Grindon

In 1902, Grindon published In Praise of Shakespeare’s Merry Wives of Windsor: An Essay in Exposition and Appreciation. At the time Grindon was writing, The Merry Wives, according to Phyllis Rackin, "was rarely performed and almost universally disparaged as a second or third-rate play". Her monograph sought to defend the play, in particularly arguing that the play had been for Queen Elizabeth, and that as such "women were best suited to understand and judge it." Rackin describes Grindon as an "apologist for Shakespeare’s female characters". Another critic, referencing Grindon's essay on Antony and Cleopatra, have called her suggestion that "the men critics in their sympathy for Antony, have treated Cleopatra just as Antony’s men friends did, and for the same cause", a "delightful and provocative thesis".

Grindon coached the Pastoral Players, an amateur theatre group who performed Shakespearean scenes in an open-air theatre in her back garden.

=== Shakespeare Tercentenary ===
In the winter of 1912/13, ahead of the 300th anniversary of Shakespeare's death, Grindon established the Manchester Shakespeare Tercentenary Association. Despite the outbreak of World War I, the Association organised many commemorative activities, and led to the formation of a Shakespeare Library and Museum. Shakespearean revivals took place at Manchester's Queen's Theatre, surrounding which Grindon gave an accompanying lecture series each season.

In 1916, the tercentenary year, a celebration was held under the joint auspices of the Manchester Shakespeare Tercentenary Association and the Life Study Society. During the event, a presentation was made to Rosa Grindon by the Lord Mayor on behalf of the subscribers:

[a] sign of the friendly goodwill and affectionate admiration for a lady who has dene so much not only in connection with the Commemoration, but for the study of Shakespeare for many years in Manchester.

Grindon was given a cheque for £40, and an illuminated address, reading:

To Mrs. Rosa Leo Grindon, Shakespeare Tercentenary Commemoration, 1916. A number of your fellow members of the Manchester Tercentenary Assuciation and Life Study Society, together with other friends who appreciate your valuable labours, desire to place in your hands a sum of money for the continuation. in any form you please, of the work to which you are devoted. They are aware that you do not desire personal gifts, but in asking your acceptance of their contributions to aid Shakespearean research they beg you to believe that they are animated by the highest regard for yourself and admiration for your ideals. At a period of unexampled difficulty you succeeded, by your unflagging efforts and undaunted courage, in securing a fitting Commemoration of the Shakespeare Tercentenary in Manchester. Your friends are grateful to you for your enthusiastic public service, and trust that you will long be able to exercise your beneficent and uplifting influence in their midst.

The dedication was signed by nearly 100 names.

In the same year 1916, she was instrumental in establishing a Shakespeare Garden in Whitworth Park, which in turn prompted the creation of the larger Shakespeare Garden in Platt Fields Park in 1922.

In 1917, along with a gift of £2,000 for the "provision and upkeep of a meeting and lecture room in the future Manchester Free Reference Library, Grindon donated all of her material relating to the Shaksperean Tercentenary Association to Manchester libraries.

== Death and legacy ==
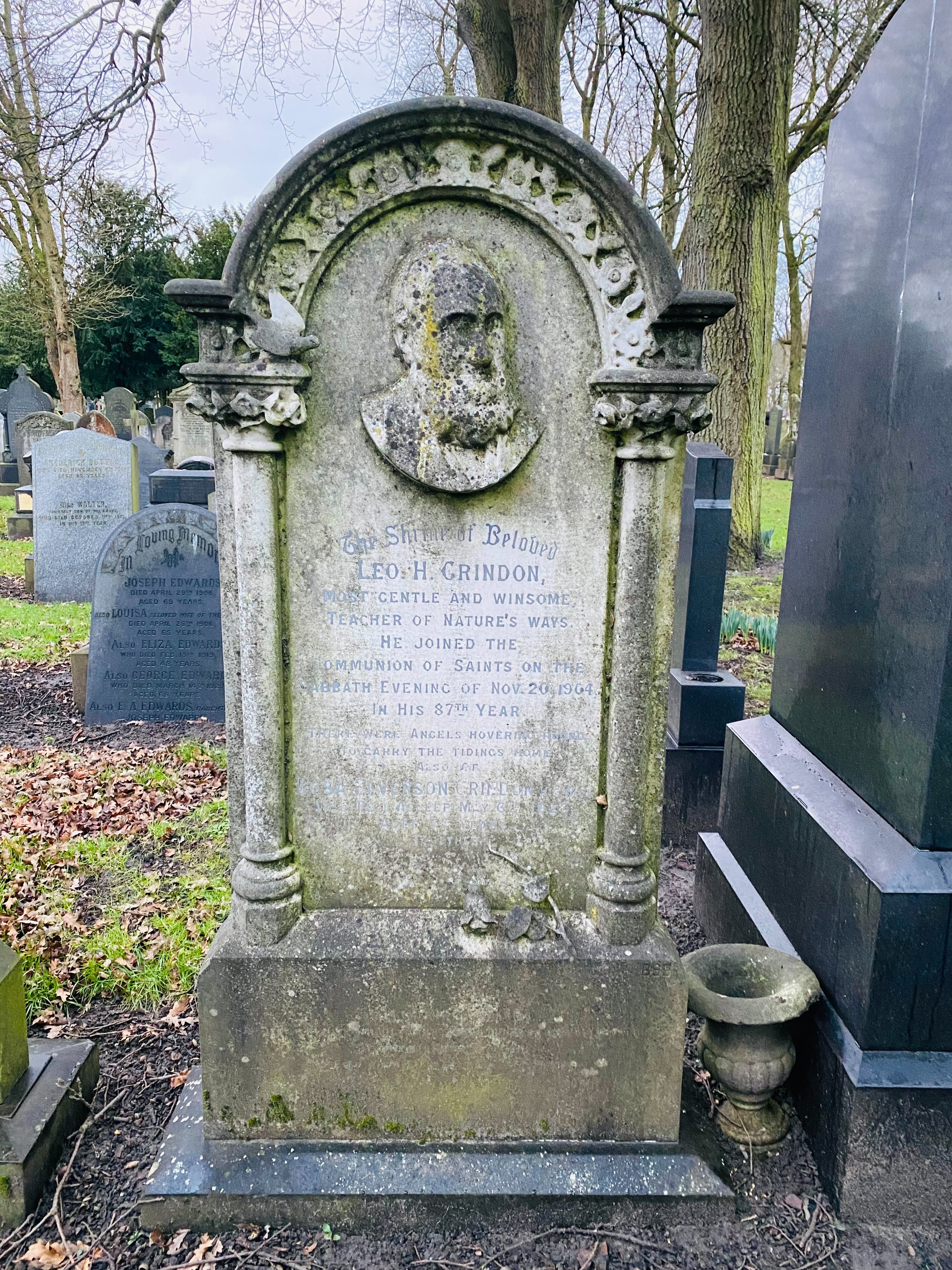
Gravestone of Leopold and Rosa E. Grindon

Rosa Grindon died at home in Manchester on 6 May 1923. Following her death, admirers donated a medallion likeness of Grindon to be hung in the Town Hall.

In her will, Grindon left £1,000 for the creation of a series of stained glass windows depicting scenes from Shakespeare's plays, intended for Manchester Town Hall. The window, designed by Robert Anning Bell, can be seen in today in Manchester Central Library, as can a bronze medallion of Grindon by John Cassidy.

In 1930, a posthumous edited collection of Grindon's lectures on Shakespeare was published as Shakespeare and His Plays from a Woman’s Point of View.

A mural depicting Rosa Grindon by artist Ethan Lemon can be seen today near the entrance to Platt Fields Park at the junction of Albion Road and Mabfield Road.
