= Greater Manchester County Record Office =

- 53.48703°N 2.23431°W
- Location: Manchester Central Library; St Peter's Square; Manchester; M2 5PD, England
- Type: Public archive
- Scope: "To store historical records relating to the Greater Manchester area, and to make them available for members of the public for research".
- Established: 1976
- Branch of: County Archive Research Network

Other information
- Website: www.archivesplus.org www.gmcro.co.uk{defunct}

The Greater Manchester County Record Office (GMCRO) is an archive of primary materials relating to the heritage of Greater Manchester, in North West England; it is located in Manchester city centre, in Archives + in Manchester's Central Library. Opened in 1976, the main function of the GMCRO is to store historical records relating to Greater Manchester, and to make them available for members of the public for research. There are 4 miles (6 km) of shelving of records, which date back to 1197.

The Greater Manchester County Record Office is funded by the Association of Greater Manchester Authorities.

Before it moved to its present location the record office was at 56 Marshall Street, New Cross, M4 5FU.

== See also ==
- People's History Museum
