= Leopold Hartley Grindon =

English educator and botanist, 1818–1904

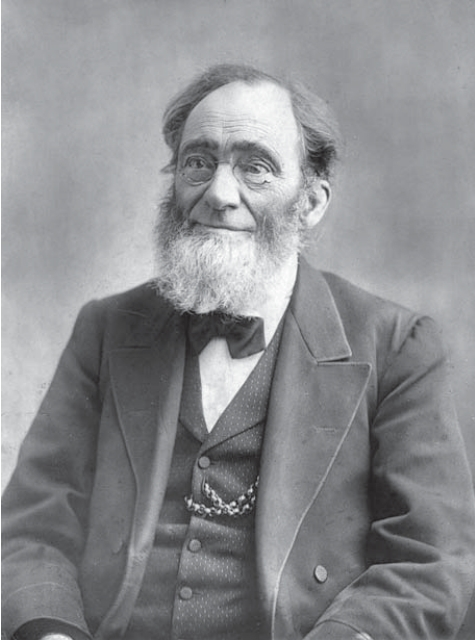

Leopold Hartley Grindon (28 March 1818 – 20 November 1904) was an English educator and botanist, and a pioneer in adult education. His plant collection and botanical drawings and writings formed a major asset of the herbarium at Manchester Museum, when it was founded in 1860.

== Early life ==
Leopold Hartley Grindon was born in Bristol on 28 March 1818 and educated at Bristol College. He established the Bristol Philobotanical Society while still at school. He moved to Manchester at the age of 20, spending a year as an apprentice in a warehouse before becoming a cashier for John Whittaker & Company's cotton business until 1864.

== Botany ==
Grindon, whose father was a solicitor and coroner, showed an early interest in botany and was self-taught in other areas of science, such as astronomy and geology. At the age of 13, he started collecting dried plants and by 18 he envisaged creating a herbarium of all the cultivated and wild plants found in Britain. He grew many specimens from seed and collected writings and drawings, particularly of plants that were difficult to grow or obtain in specimen form. As he put it, "I desired also to introduce every bit of printed matter referring to the plant that might come in my way, with descriptions alike of the individual species and of the Natural Orders, the uses and other particulars also have a place and seeing that Botany is wreathed also with all kinds of poetical and other human associations, everything that would illustrate these was also to go into the Herbarium so-called, which thus to be a Herbarium and a Botanical library fused into one."

In 1860, Grindon and a calico printer, Joseph Sidebotham, founded the Manchester Field-Naturalists' Society. He attended the Mechanics' Institute and was appointed to lecture on botany at the Manchester Royal School of Medicine, while offering private tuition in the subject.

== Death ==
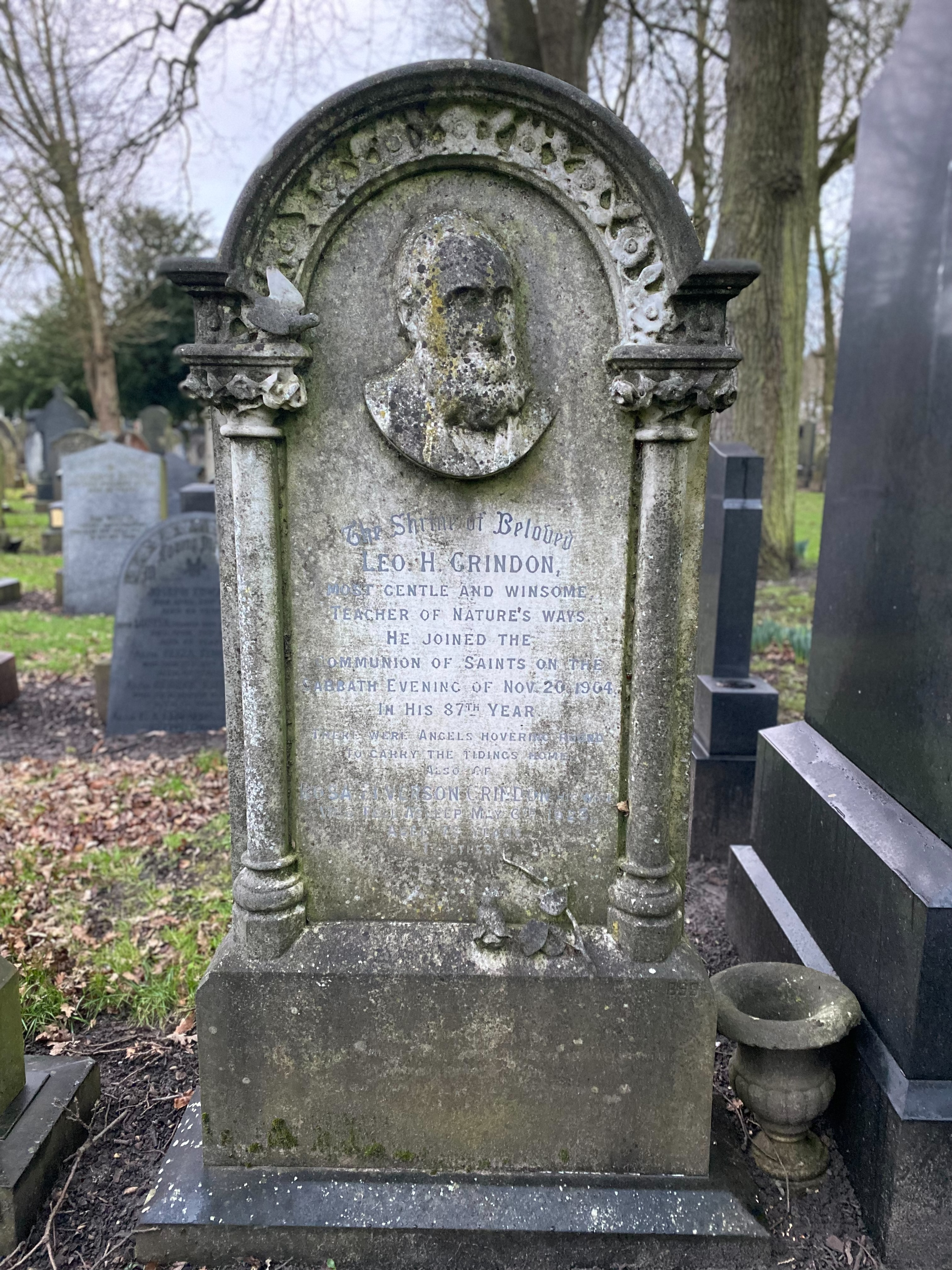
The grave of Rosa and Leopold Grindon in Southern Cemetery, Manchester

Grindon moved to Manchester, living initially in Portland Street, then in Romford Street for 30 years. In 1883 he moved to Cecil Street in Greenheys, where he died aged 87 in 1904.

He married Rosa Elverson, a sympathiser with the feminist movement and lecturer at local institutions such as the Manchester Geographical Society and the Manchester Working Men's Clubs Association. She outlived him and donated a large stained-glass window to Manchester Central Library in his memory. The window, designed by Robert Anning Bell, is above the entrance to the library's Shakespeare Hall.

== Publications ==
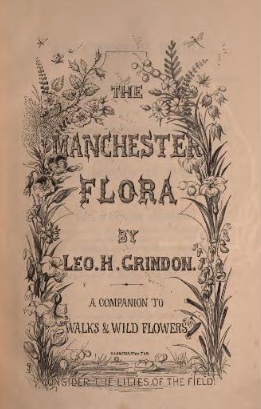
Frontispiece to The Manchester Flora, a Leo. H. Grindon book published in 1859.

Among Grindon's publications, many written while still employed as a cashier, are:

- Life, its Nature, Varieties and Phenomena. London: Whittaker & Co. 1856.
- Manchester Walks and Wild Flowers (1858)
- The Manchester Flora. London: William White. 1859.
- British and Garden Botany. London: Routledge, Warne & Routledge. 1864.
- Summer Rambles in Cheshire, Derbyshire, Lancashire, and Yorkshire. Manchester: Palmer & Howe. 1866.
- The Trees of Old England. London: F. Pitman. 1868.
- Echoes in Plant and Flower Life. London: F. Pitman. 1869.
- The Fairfield Orchids (1872)
- The Pathway to Botany. London: F. Pitman. 1872.
- History of the Rhododendron (1876)
- Figurative Language. London: James Spiers. 1879.
- Country Rambles. Manchester: Palmer & Howe. 1882.
- The Shakespeare Flora. Manchester: Palmer & Howe. 1883.
- Fruits and Fruit Trees. Manchester: Palmer & Howe. 1885.
- Lancashire; brief historical and descriptive notes. London: Seely and Co. 1892.

Grindon also contributed to many journals and to the Manchester City News, and wrote works unconnected with botany, such as Manchester Banks and Bankers (1877) and A History of Lancashire (1882).

He was elected to membership of the Manchester Literary and Philosophical Society on 21 April 1863.
