= Sarah Perks =

British curator and artistic director

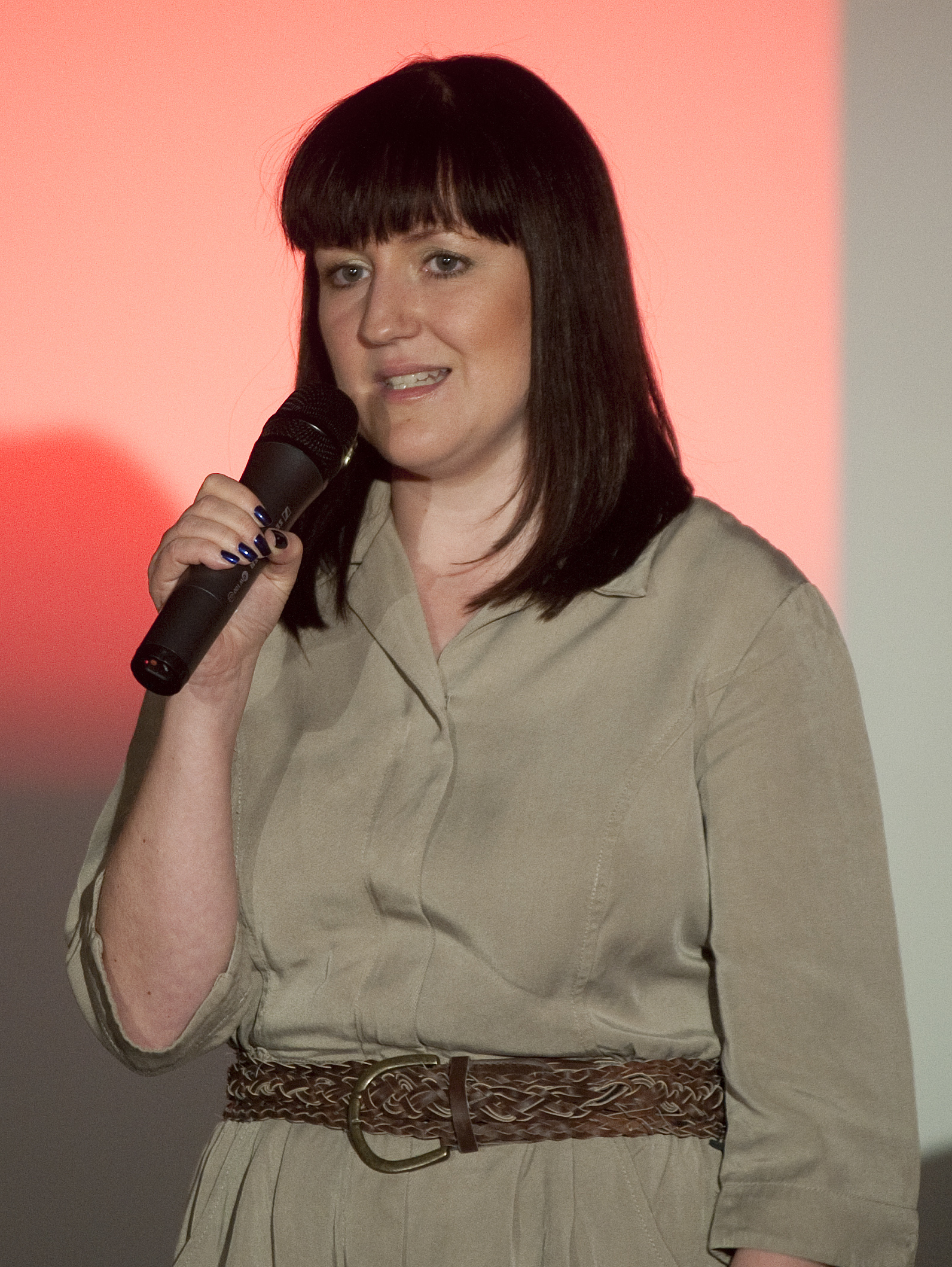

Academic background
- Education: Manchester Metropolitan University

Sarah Perks is an international curator and producer of contemporary visual art, independent film, and engagement. She was the Artistic Director for Visual Arts and Film at HOME, the centre for international contemporary arts, theatre, and film formed by the merger of Cornerhouse and the Library Theatre Company. She is currently a Professor of Curating at Teesside University. Perks has curated more than thirty exhibitions.

== Education ==
Perks has a Bachelor of Arts in the history of film, photography and visual media and a Master of Arts in visual culture, both from the Manchester Metropolitan University.

== Career ==
As of 2024 Perks is Professor of Curating at Teesside University. She was previously Professor of Visual Art at Manchester School of Art, and served as the Artistic Director for Visual Arts and Film at HOME, the centre for international contemporary arts, theatre, and film formed by the merger of Cornerhouse and the Library Theatre Company. She has lectured at institutions such as Manchester Metropolitan University and the University of Manchester. Perks is a lecturer, presenter, and published author on contemporary culture, covering topics ranging from creative industries to postcolonialism.

From 2009 to 2015 Perks was the artistic director at Cornerhouse. In 2011, Perks founded Cornerhouse Artist Film, a UK-based distributor specializing in artist feature films. The company's first release was Self Made, the directorial debut of Turner Prize-winning artist Gillian Wearing, which was distributed theatrically in the UK and Ireland. The second, which was also co-commissioned by Cornerhouse, was Andrew Kotting’s Swandown. In January 2014, Perks curated Jamie Shovlin: Hiker Meat, a solo exhibition that featured the new commission Rough Cut, an installation and feature-length film produced in partnership with the Toronto International Film Festival and entered into competition at the 43rd Rotterdam International Film Festival.

Throughout her career, Perks has collaborated with notable artists including Phil Collins, Jeremy Deller, Rosa Barba, Gillian Wearing, and David Shrigley. Her curatorial projects include the group exhibition Anguish and Enthusiasm: What do you do with your revolution once you've got it?? and the performance and video work of Los Angeles-based artist Stanya Kahn: It’s Cool I’m Good. Since 2022, she has collaborated with artist Paul Alexander Stewart under the banner Forms of Circulation on film and collaborative projects with IMT Gallery, London, The National Horizon Centre, Brent Biennial 2024, and Natural England. Their latest film has received acclaim and multiple selections for film festivals globally, including the Busan Experimental Film Festival, where it won Best Short Documentary in 2024, as well as at the London Film Festival 2024.

Perks co-edited two special editions of the journal Film International, one focusing on film noir, which featured contributions from various artists, filmmakers, and writers, and Hong Kong cinema.

== Awards ==
In 2009, she was a finalist for the British Council Creative Entrepreneur Award for Visual Arts, and was one of Creative Review’s 50 Creative Leaders in 2017. The Creative Review citation noted that Perk has curated more than thirty exhibitions and produced more than 100 commissions.

== Selected publications ==
- Balsom, Erika; Reynolds, Lucy; Perks, Sarah, eds. (15 October 2019). Artists Moving Image in Britain Since 1989. Paul Mellon Centre. ISBN 9781913107017.
- Perks, S; Vanderschelden, I; Willis, A (2005). Alternatives to Hollywood: A Teacher's Guide. Liverpool University Press.
- Perks, S; O'Callaghan, B (1 June 2017). Dark habits. Manchester: Home Publications. ISBN 9780993591235.
