= Association of Greater Manchester Authorities =

Local government authority in North-West England

- AGMA's zone of influence in red
- Abbreviation: AGMA
- Formation: 1986
- Type: Governmental
- Purpose: Strategic local governance of Greater Manchester
- Headquarters: Wigan Investment Centre, Waterside Drive, Wigan
- Location: Wigan
- Coordinates: 53.53950°N 2.63597°W
- Region served: Greater Manchester
- Chair: Peter Smith, Baron Smith of Leigh
- Main organ: Executive Board
- Parent organization: Greater Manchester Combined Authority
- Staff: 0 (Note: AGMA states that it "is not a legal entity and does not own any assets, can not enter into any contractual arrangements or employ any staff. Where this is necessary this role is taken on by one of the [constituent] authorities on behalf of all 10".)
- Website: www.agma.gov.uk

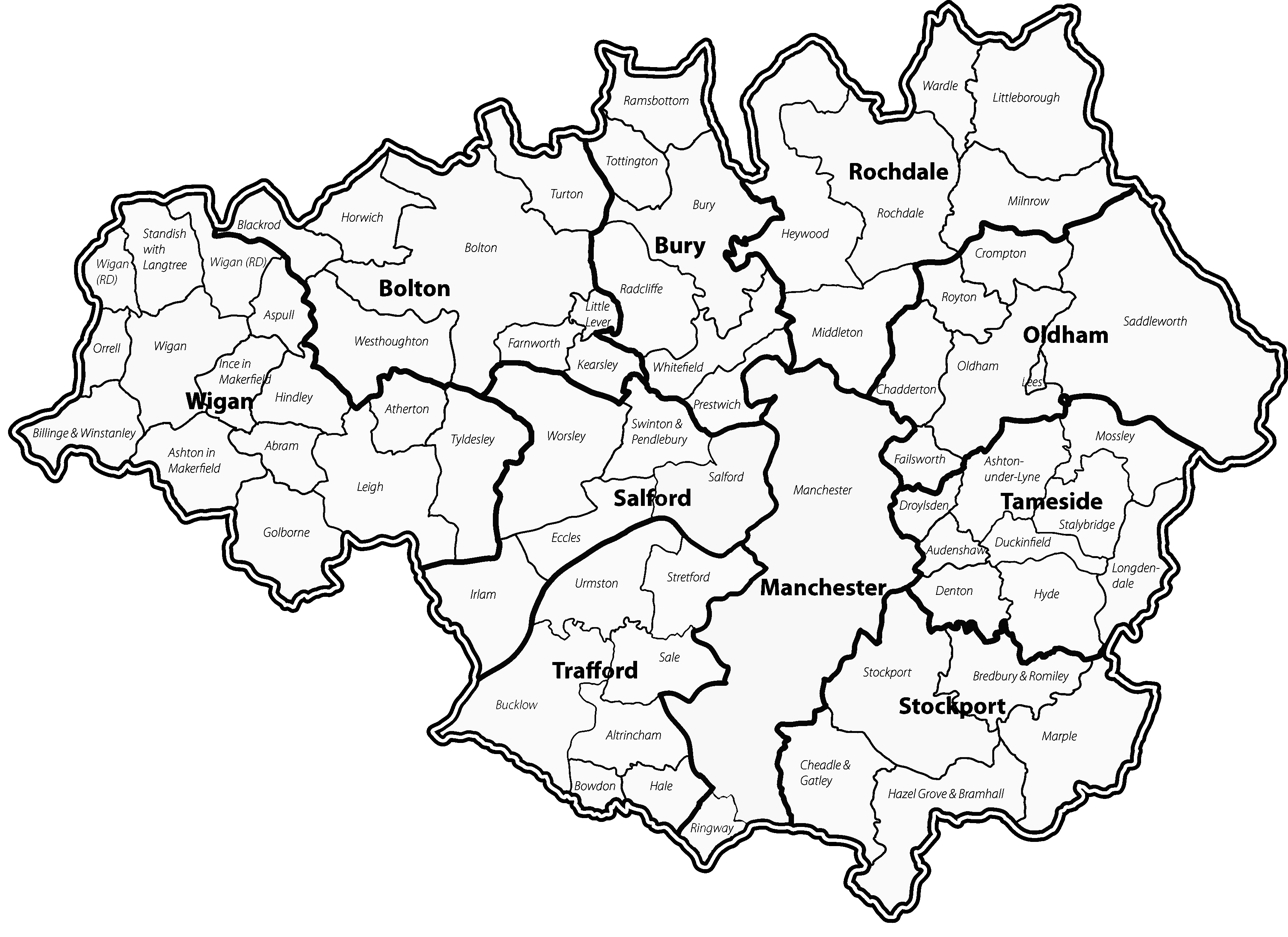
Metropolitan boroughs of Greater Manchester

The Association of Greater Manchester Authorities (AGMA) is the local government association for Greater Manchester, a metropolitan county in North West England. Its creation followed the abolition of the Greater Manchester County Council, being established in 1986 as a governmental organisation to represent the ten district councils of Greater Manchester. AGMA was largely superseded by the Greater Manchester Combined Authority, the first authority of this new type in the United Kingdom, on 1 April 2011.

The Local Government Act 1985, which abolished the metropolitan county councils of England, included provisions for the district councils in each abolished area in England to vote to establish a county-wide replacement body if they considered this to be the most efficient and effective way of providing certain county-wide services. Greater Manchester was one of a minority of the affected urban areas in England to vote for such a new body under the act of Parliament. AGMA has a constitution and committee structure, with the leaders of the ten district councils meeting as its head to develop county-wide policies and services.

AGMA is an organisation with "permissive statutory powers", in that seven or more of the ten district councils had to formally vote it into existence, but once established it had delegated statutory powers, staff and budgets and as such AGMA developed policy, lobbied government and others, and ran a range of services designed to make strategic and tangible advances in the standards of living across Greater Manchester.

The Executive Board of AGMA is composed of representatives from Greater Manchester's ten metropolitan boroughs, and the Greater Manchester Combined Authority, who are all members by subscription. Additionally the Bee Network Committee and the Greater Manchester Business Board, along with local authorities outside of Greater Manchester, may be admitted as non-voting associate members. Blackpool, Blackburn with Darwen, Cheshire East and Warrington have been associate members with representation at AGMA debates and meetings. AGMA also oversaw the management and policies of the Greater Manchester County Record Office, which preserved an archive with records of the local history of Greater Manchester, now known as "Archives+" and based in Manchester Central Library. The AGMA Policy and Research Unit was based in Wigan.

AGMA also chose to operate a Section 48 Grants Committee, named after the part of the Local Government Act 1985 which permitted a levy on the district councils to fund co-ordinated grants to voluntary organisations which operated across the Greater Manchester area and who might otherwise 'slip through the cracks'. The Greater Manchester Council for Voluntary Service had been instrumental in lobbying to strengthen the powers of section 48 of the Local Government Act 1985 when it was still being debated as a bill in the House of Lords.

Prior to the establishment of the combined authority AGMA made representations on behalf of Greater Manchester to the government of the United Kingdom, the North West Development Agency, the European Union, business and other bodies, lobbying for investment and funding. AGMA actively pursued a formal and statutory government structure for Greater Manchester throughout the 2000s and made a successful bid to the UK's central government to constitute Greater Manchester as a Statutory City Region.

== Legacy ==
Perhaps one of AGMA's key and enduring innovations in devolved government was to spread the responsibilities for various statutory functions such as fire, waste, transport, grants, evenly around the leaders of the ten districts regardless of the size of the borough or of the political parties which controlled various boroughs at any one time, which helped to reduce some of the local rivalries and tensions and to create a forum for such conflicts to be debated and managed. Possibly this maturity prefigured the later creation of Combined Authorities and Elected Mayors. The ten districts were also the sole shareholders of Manchester Airport, another common interest.

== History ==
=== Background ===
The Association of Greater Manchester Authorities (AGMA) was established in 1986 following the Local Government Act 1985, which abolished the Greater Manchester County Council. It has operated as a voluntary association representing the collective interests of the local authorities within Greater Manchester and as a joint committee with responsibilities for a number of residual functions previously performed by the Greater Manchester County Council (such as public transport and waste management control). Section 48 of the Local Government Act 1985 provided AGMA with the powers to make funding grants to voluntary organisations, and the Act also provided for functions such as the Greater Manchester County Records Office.

=== Functions and constitution ===
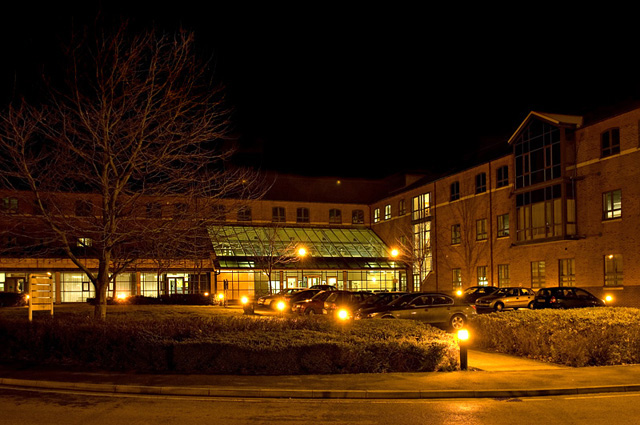
The Wigan Investment Centre, the headquarters of AGMA, located by the Leeds and Liverpool Canal, Wigan

AGMA operated as a joint committee of the 10 Greater Manchester local authorities since its creation in 1986, subsequently expanding to include the Greater Manchester Combined Authority. Under its constitution (first created in 2008), the Executive Board of AGMA coordinated economic development, housing, planning, and together with the relevant statutory bodies, transport policies for Greater Manchester with a supporting structure of seven commissions. However, although the Executive Board had the power to establish the strategic commission, it is not a body corporate, and it has no formal functions in its own right. Those it has depend on delegations from, or agreements by, its constituent local authorities as provided for in the Act of Parliament.

The AGMA Executive met monthly to deal with strategic issues that impact Greater Manchester. AGMA also provided some joint services across Greater Manchester via AGMA Units and developed policies and strategic initiatives, including its Greater Manchester Strategy.

Prior to the creation of the combined authority in 2011, six commissions were in operation, being:

- Commission for the New Economy;
- Environment;
- Improvement & Efficiency;
- Health;
- Planning & Housing; and
- Public Protection.

=== City region and combined authority ===
Following a bid from AGMA highlighting the potential benefits in combatting the Great Recession, it was announced in the 2009 United Kingdom Budget that Greater Manchester and the Leeds City Region would be awarded Statutory City Region Pilot status, allowing (if they desired) for their constituent district councils to pool resources and become a statutory combined authority with powers comparable to the Greater London Authority. The aim of the pilot was to evaluate the contributions to economic growth and sustainable development by Combined Authorities. The Local Democracy, Economic Development and Construction Act 2009 enabled the creation of a combined authority for Greater Manchester with devolved powers on public transport, skills, housing, regeneration, waste management, carbon neutrality and planning permission, pending approval from the ten councils. Such strategic matters would be decided on via a majority rule voting system involving ten members appointed from among the councillors of the ten metropolitan boroughs (one representing each borough of Greater Manchester with each council also nominating one substitute) without the input of the UK's central government. Committees will be formed from a pool of 33 councillors allocated by council population (roughly one councillor for every 75,000 residents) to scrutinise the running of bodies and their finances, approve the decisions and policies of said bodies and form strategic policy recommendations or projects for the approval of the ten-member panel. The ten district councils of Greater Manchester approved the creation of the Greater Manchester Combined Authority on 29 March 2010, and submitted its final recommendations for its constitution to the Department for Communities and Local Government and the Department for Transport. On 31 March 2010 the Communities Secretary John Denham approved the constitution and launched a 15-week public consultation on the draft bill together with the approved constitution. The Association of Greater Manchester Authorities requested that the new authority should be established in April 2011. The Greater Manchester Combined Authority had its inaugural meeting on 1 April 2011.
