= Manchester Central Library =

Listed building in Manchester, England

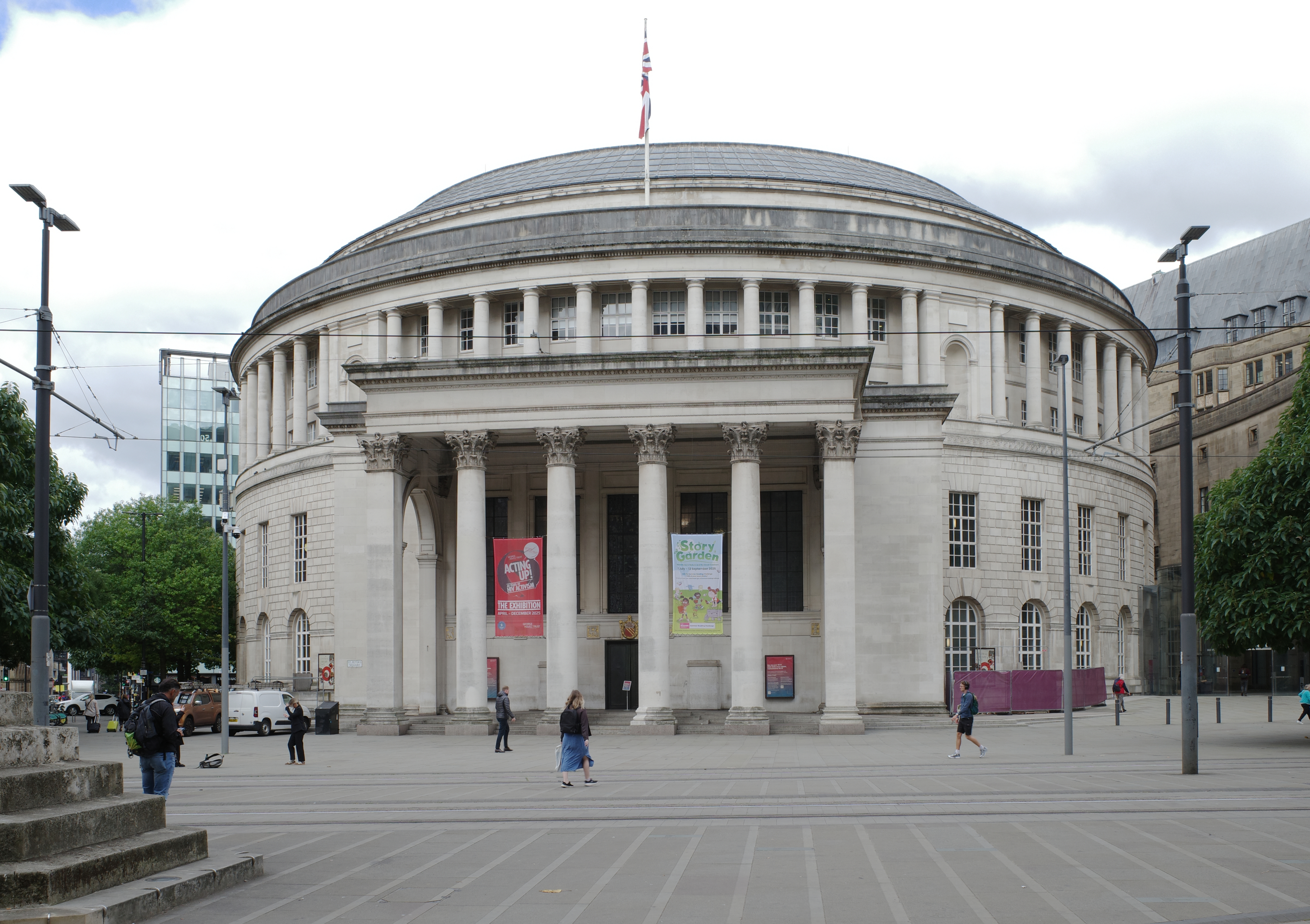
- Manchester Central Library viewed from St Peter's Square

General information
- Architectural style: Neoclassical rotunda, Tuscan colonnade in Portland stone, low pitched leaded roof and a two-storey, five-bay Corinthian portico entrance.
- Location: Manchester, United Kingdom
- Coordinates: 53.4781°N 2.2447°W
- Construction started: 1930
- Completed: 17 July 1934
- Renovated: 2010–2014
- Client: Manchester Corporation

Design and construction
- Architect: E. Vincent Harris

Listed Building – Grade II*
- Official name: Central Public Library
- Designated: 3 October 1974
- Reference no.: 1270759

Manchester Central Library is the headquarters of the city's library and information service in Manchester, England. Facing St Peter's Square, it was designed by E. Vincent Harris and constructed between 1930 and 1934. The form of the building, a columned portico attached to a rotunda domed structure, is loosely derived from the Pantheon, Rome. At its opening, one critic wrote, "This is the sort of thing which persuades one to believe in the perennial applicability of the Classical canon".

The library building is grade II* listed. A four-year project to renovate and refurbish the library commenced in 2010. Central Library re-opened on 22 March 2014.

== History ==
=== Background ===
Manchester was the first local authority to provide a public lending and reference library after the passing of the Public Libraries Act 1850. The Manchester Free Library opened at Campfield in September 1852 at a ceremony attended by Charles Dickens. When the Campfield premises were declared to be unsafe in 1877, the library was moved to the old Town Hall in King Street. The library moved again to what is now Piccadilly Gardens, to the former outpatients wing of Manchester Royal Infirmary and an old YMCA hut in 1912.

In 1926 the city council held a competition to design an extension to the town hall and a central library. E. Vincent Harris was selected to design both buildings. His circular design for the library, reminiscent of the Pantheon in Rome, was based on libraries in America. The library's foundation stone was laid on 6 May 1930 by the Prime Minister Ramsay MacDonald. The Manchester City Architect G. Noel Hill was involved with the scheme. The library was officially opened by King George V on 17 July 1934 after he had laid the foundation stone for the Town Hall Extension.

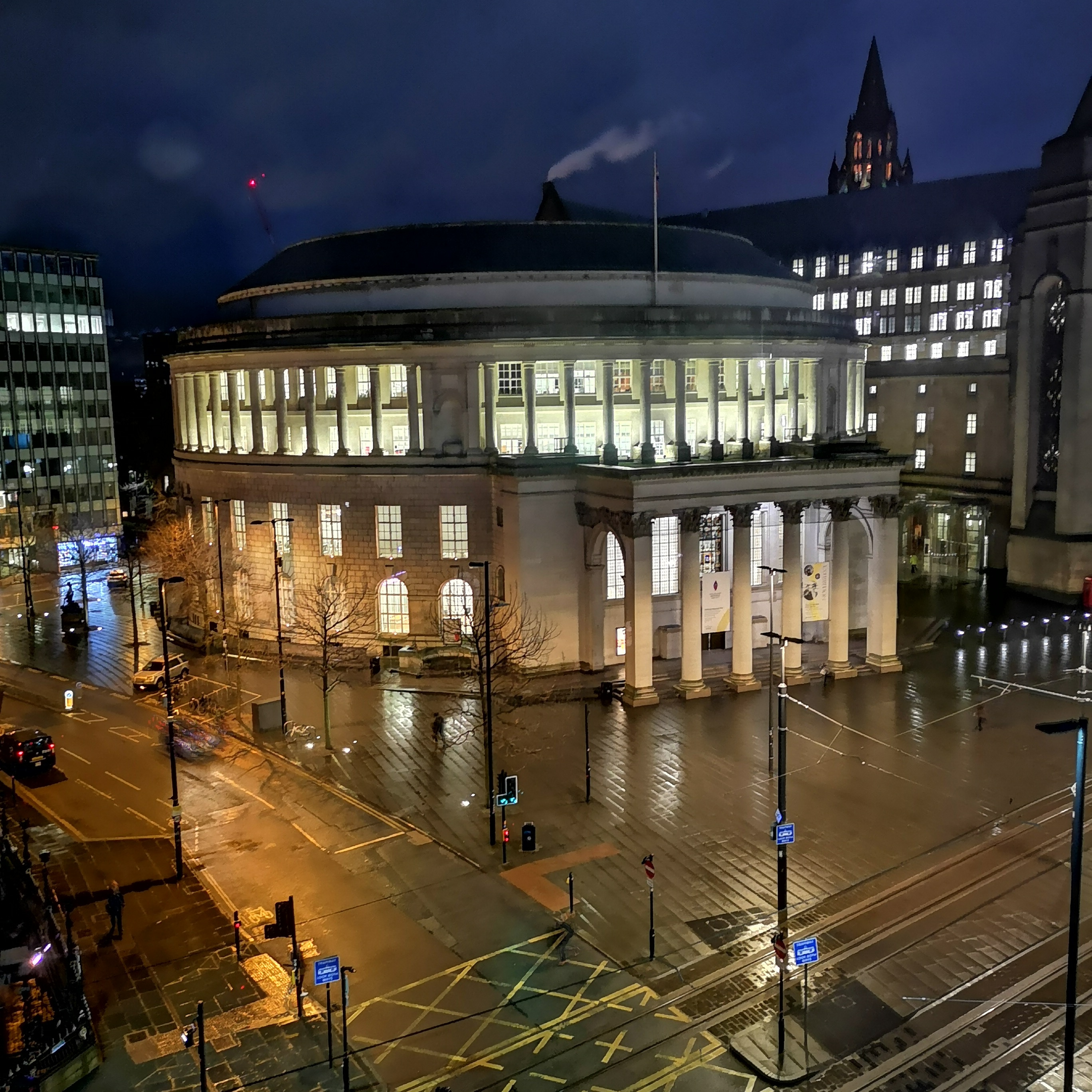
Manchester Central Library at night

In 1934 the Blind Collection from Deansgate and the Commercial Library from the Royal Exchange were moved to the library. The Chinese Library Service was set up in 1968.

=== Opening ===
The Central Library opened in 1934 to much fanfare. Singer-songwriter Ewan MacColl reminisced on the opening: "The new Central Library which replaced the chicken house was an imposing circular structure with an enormous reading room, a small theatre and carrels where serious students could carry on their research without interruption. The portico of the magnificent edifice quickly became a popular rendezvous and 'Meet you at the Ref' became a familiar phrase on the lips of students, lovers and unemployed youths. I was there on the opening day and on many days thereafter; the Ref played an important part in my life for I made many friends there."

The library was declared open by King George V on 17 July 1934. George V declared to the crowd: "In the splendid building which I am about to open, the largest library in this country provided by a local authority, the Corporation have ensured for the inhabitants of the city magnificent opportunities for further education and for the pleasant use of leisure."

An employee at the library who was present on opening day said: "When it was being built the public were very intrigued about its final appearance – they were used to rectangular buildings and the shape of the girders used seemed to make little sense. I remember families coming in first to 'gawp'... Under the portico became a favourite trysting place. In all, the shape of the building was its best advertisement and it was never necessary to put a notice 'Public Library' on the outside."

=== Renovation ===
Reports emerged in 2008 that the Central Library needed essential renovation to repair and modernise its facilities. The library faced asbestos problems and needed work to maintain its 'structural integrity'. The Central Library closed from 2010 to 2014 for refurbishment and expansion. During the closure its collections were stored in the Winsford Rock Salt Mine; some of the books in the stack joined collections at Greater Manchester County Record Office. A number of its services were available at a temporary location nearby. During renovation, a temporary community library for the city centre was established on Deansgate. Central Library re-opened on 22 March 2014 after a £40 million re-design. The project delivered by Laing O'Rourke won the Construction News Judges Supreme Award in June 2015. It was described as an almost impossibly complex project completed on schedule and within budget.

The indoor plan is now very different. What was the theatre in the basement is now part of the library. A wall was knocked through, making an indoor connection between the library and Manchester Town Hall. The Library Theatre Company moved to their new theatre at the HOME complex in May 2015.

== Architecture ==
Designed by architect Vincent Harris, the striking rotunda form of the library was inspired by the Pantheon in Rome. Like its 2nd-century model, the library is a round building fronted by a large two-storey portico which forms the main entrance on St Peter's Square, and is surrounded by five bays of Corinthian columns. Around the second and third floors is a Tuscan colonnade, topped by a band of unrelieved Portland stone.

The pitched leaded roof appears from street level to be a dome, but this is only a surrounding roof. The dome that can be seen from within the Great Hall lies within this roof, and cannot be seen from the ground.

On the first floor is the Great Hall, a large reading room topped by a dome. Much of the original furniture designed by the architect can be seen on this floor. Around the rim of the dome is an inscription from the Book of Proverbs in the Old Testament:

Wisdom is the principal thing; therefore get wisdom, and with all thy getting get understanding. Exalt her and she shall promote thee; she shall bring thee to honour when thou dost embrace her, she shall give of thine head an ornament of grace, a crown of glory she shall deliver to thee.

— Proverbs 4:7

In former years, the dome's acoustics caused an echo problem, which repeated several times any short noise made in the room. Adding sound-absorbing material reduced this effect.

The Shakespeare Hall is an ornate chamber displaying local heraldry and with large stained glass windows. The central window was designed by Robert Anning Bell and depicts William Shakespeare and scenes from his plays. Two side windows designed by George Kruger Gray depict the coats of arms of the City of Manchester, the University of Manchester, and the County and Duchy of Lancaster. The windows were a memorial bequest to the library by Rosa E. Grindon (1848–1923), the widow of Manchester botanist Leo Grindon.

The ceiling decorations include the arms and crests of the Duchy of Lancaster, the See of York, the See of Manchester, the City of Manchester, and Lancashire County Council. The walls of Shakespeare Hall are covered with Hopton Wood Stone quarried in Derbyshire. On the walls are the arms of The Manchester Grammar School, Manchester University, the Manchester Regiment, Humphrey Chetham, the Overseers of the Township, England, St. George, St. Mary (patron saint of Manchester), and over the memorial window, Shakespeare.

On the left landing is a white marble statue, The Reading Girl by the Italian sculptor Giovanni Ciniselli. It was bought by the industrialist and promoter of the Manchester Ship Canal, Daniel Adamson. The statue was presented to the library by his grandchildren, the Parkyn family, in 1938.

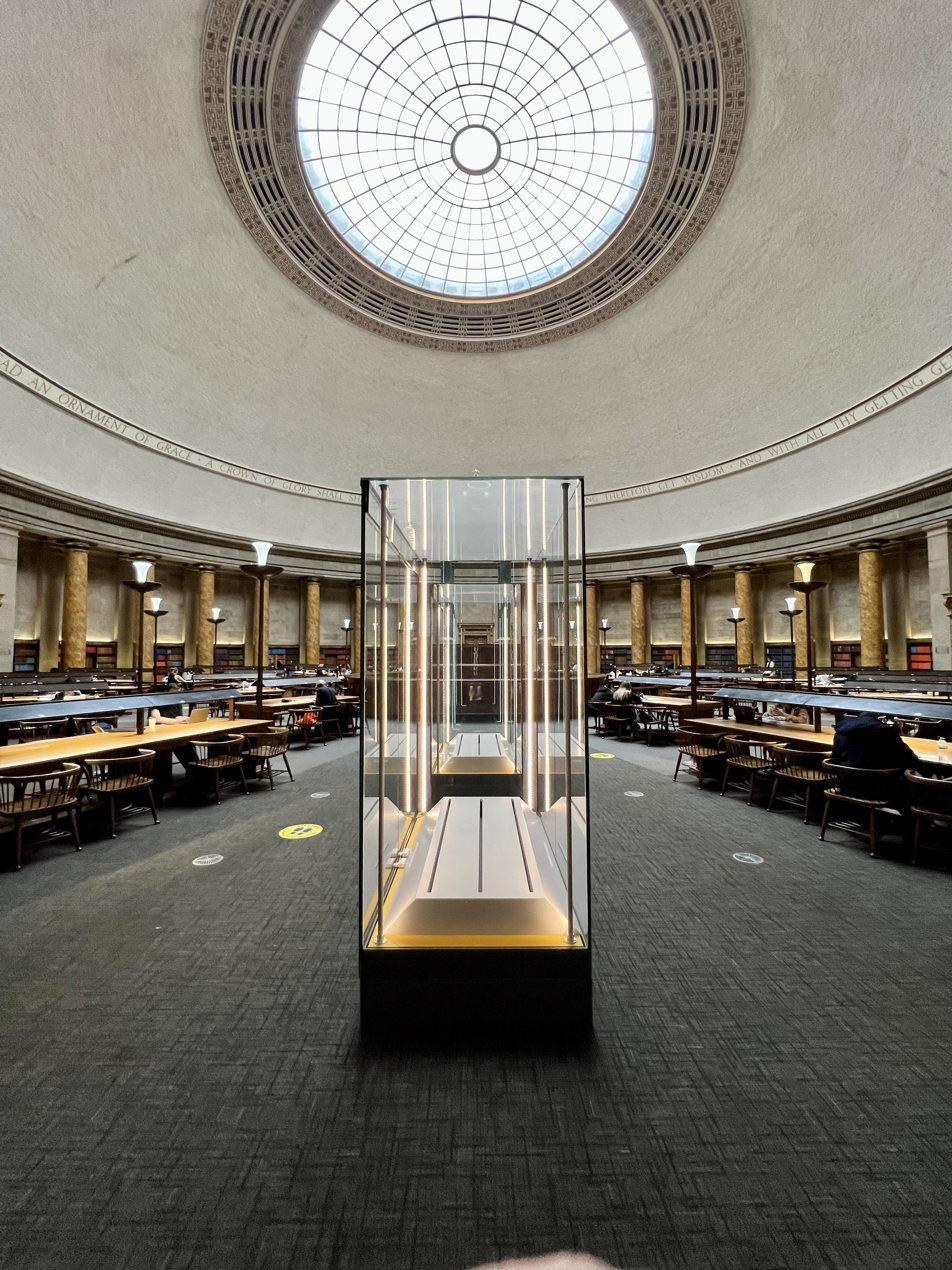
The central Wolfson Reading Room in 2021

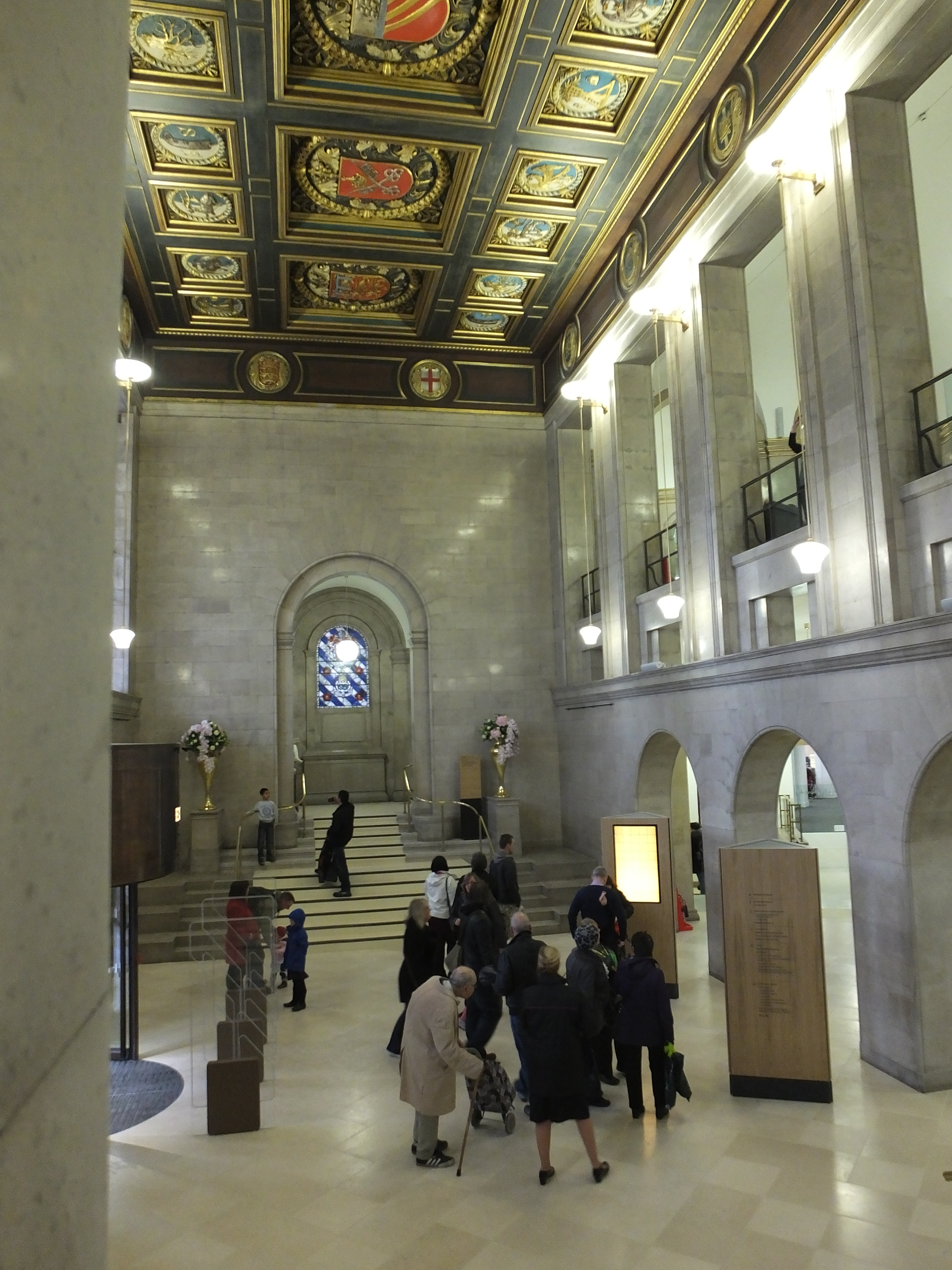
The Shakespeare Hall entrance in 2014

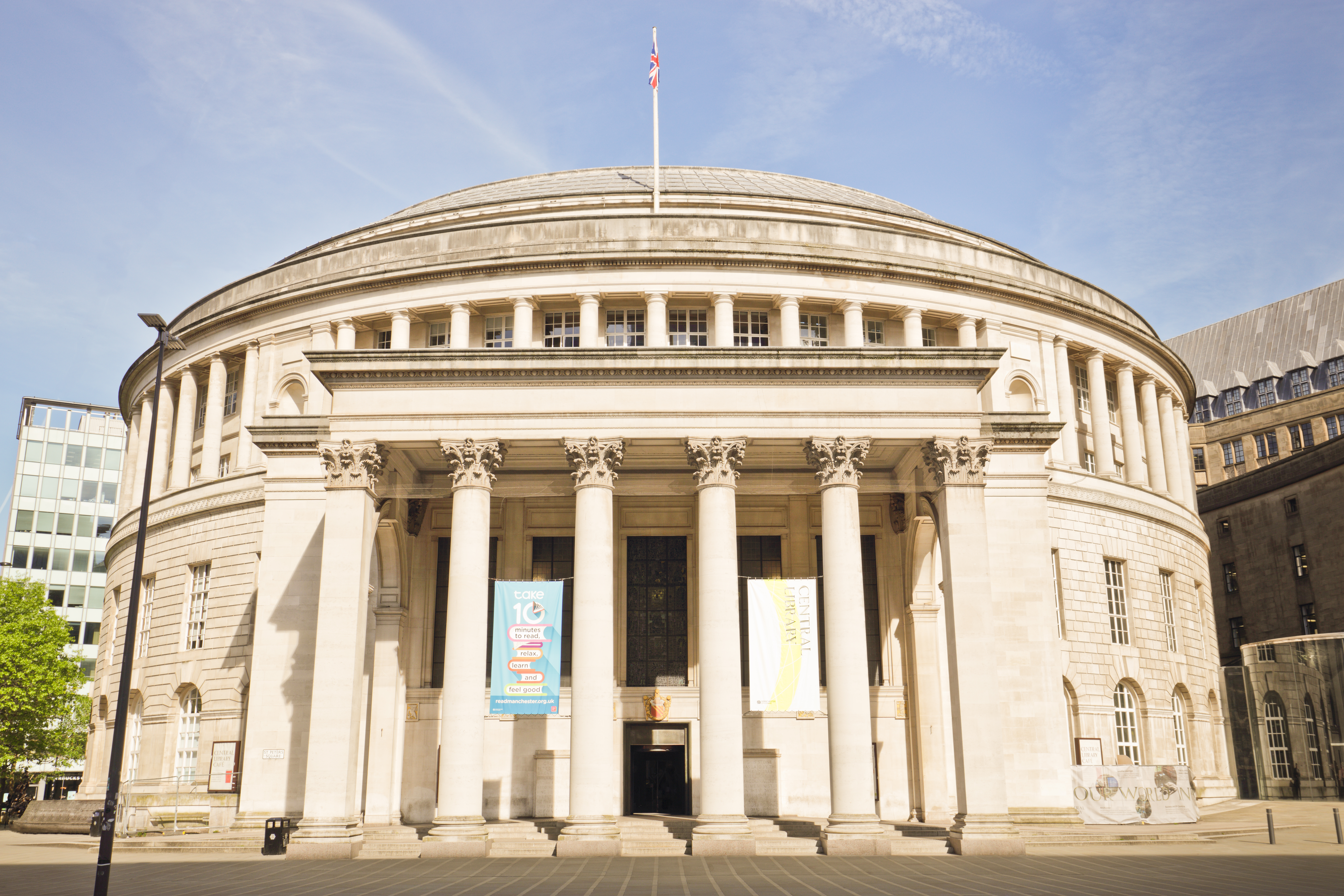
The exterior of the library

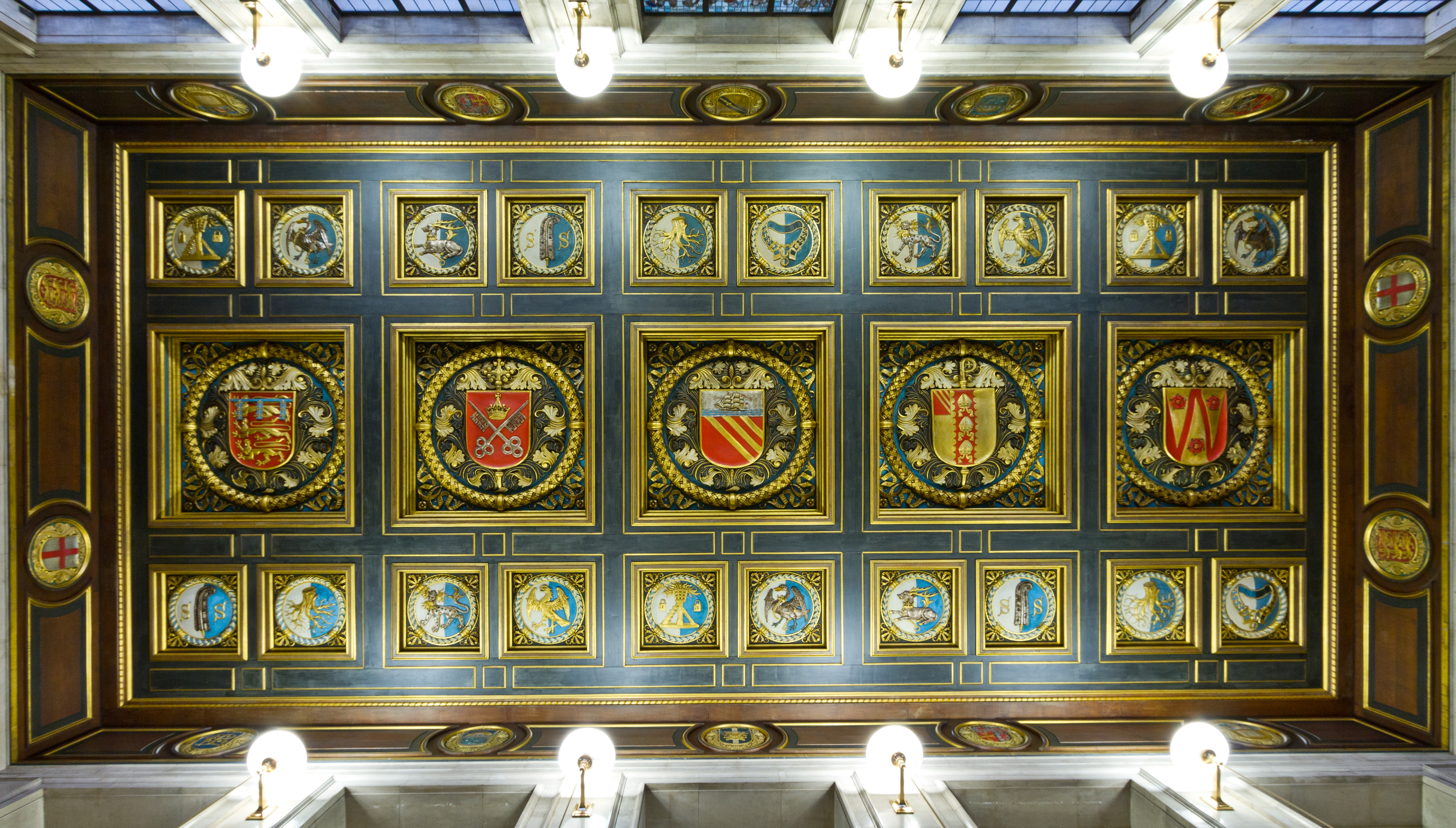
The ceiling in the entrance

== Collections ==
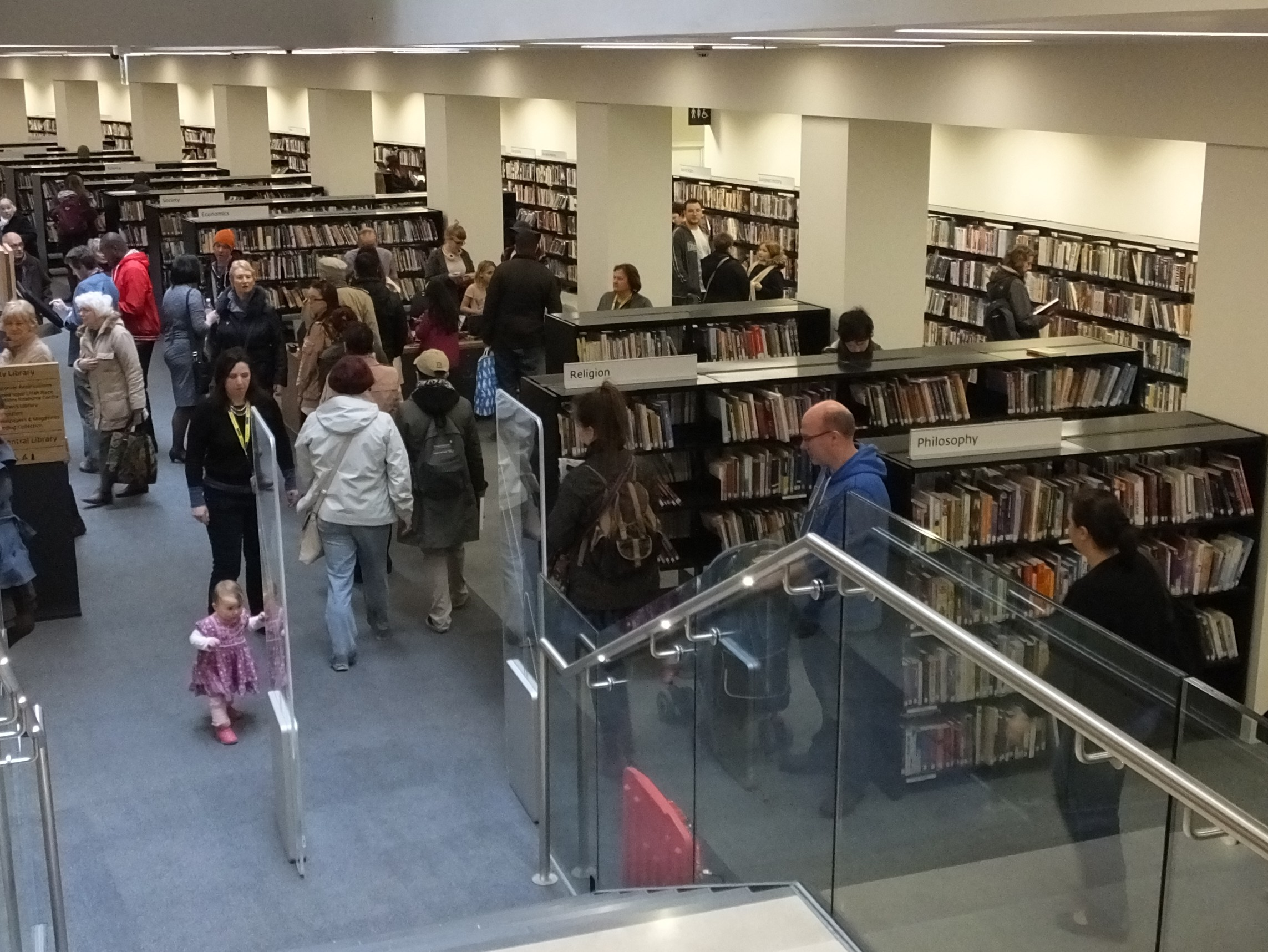
The new Lending Library in 2014

It is the second largest public lending library in Britain, after the Library of Birmingham.

Beneath the Great Hall were four floors of steel book stacks providing 35 miles (56 km) of shelving which accommodated one million books: video. Those floors were only accessible to employees and were environmentally controlled to protect the books, many of which are old and fragile. The upper two stack floors occupied all the area under the dome. The fourth level, the archive unit, was in the basement of the building. The lower two stack floors were smaller because the basement theatre took some of that area. In 2011 when the library closed for the alterations, there were 3,600 stack columns supporting approximately 45,000 shelves; those columns were rooted in the sandstone rock underneath and supported the Great Hall's reinforced concrete floor. Placed end to end, those shelves would have covered over 35 miles (56 km). The total floor area was about 7,000 square yards (5,850 m^{2}). After the 2010–2014 alterations, many of the former stack books (except rare or valuable or fragile books) are on public shelves.

The library collections include over 30 incunabula (books published before 1500) and many first and early editions of major works. The special collections include:

- The Gaskell Collection – works by Elizabeth Gaskell, one of the most important writers to have lived and worked in the city
- The Theatre Collection – a record of the history of theatre in Manchester
- The Henry Watson Music library – one of the largest public library collections of sheet music, named after the Mancunian musician and composer Dr Henry Watson (1846–1911) who bequeathed his collection to the library. It was officially opened in 1947 by Sir John Barbirolli.
- The Newman Flower Collection of Handel Manuscripts – acquired from the estate of Sir Newman Flower by the Henry Watson Music library in 1965. This library of rare manuscripts had originally been collected by Charles Jennens, a close friend of George Frederic Handel, and was later held in the collection of the Earl of Aylesford. It contains works by Handel, as well as items of Italian music from the early 18th century, including concerto partbooks of the Four Seasons by Antonio Vivaldi. Notably, the collection also includes a number of previously unknown violin sonatas by Vivaldi, autographed by the composer, which are now known as The Manchester Sonatas.

== Library Theatre ==
The Library Theatre occupied much of the basement of Manchester Central Library and was the home of the Library Theatre Company, a Manchester City Council service. It was built in 1934 as a lecture theatre, and since 1952 had been used by the Library Theatre Company. After the 2011–2014 alterations, its area is now part of the library. A new theatre opened on First Street in partnership with Cornerhouse, Manchester in 2015.

== Memorials ==
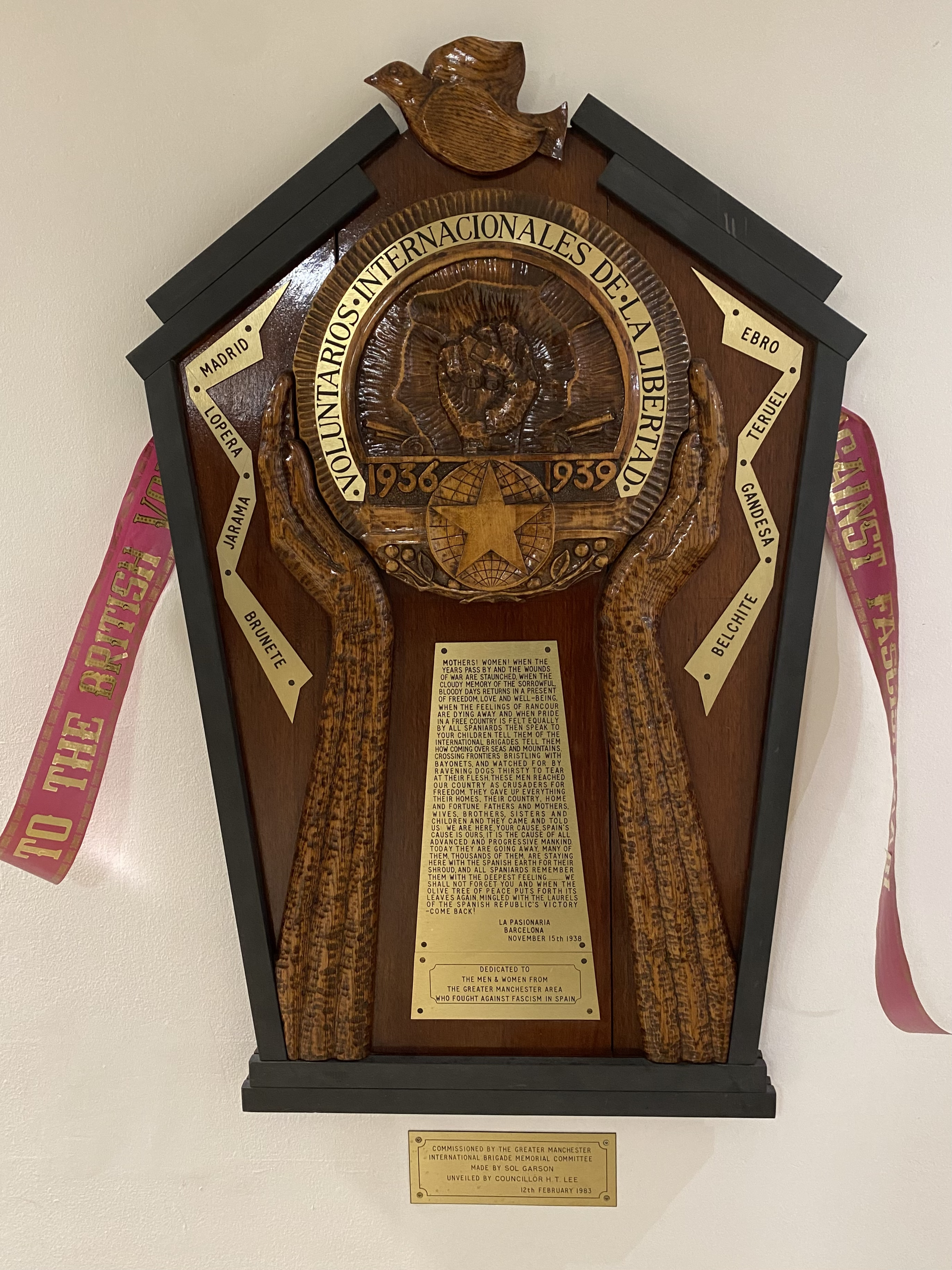
Spanish Civil War Memorial, Manchester Central Library

There is a memorial to those from Greater Manchester who fought in the Spanish Civil War as part of the International Brigades. The inscription reads "Voluntarios Internacionales de la Libertad dedicated to the men & women from the Greater Manchester area who fought against fascism in Spain". The memorial was designed by Sol Garson, and unveiled by Cllr. H.T. Lee on 12 February 1983.

== Famous users ==
Anthony Burgess, the author who wrote the novel A Clockwork Orange, was a regular visitor to the library during his school days. In a volume of his autobiography, Little Wilson and Big God (1987) he recounted his visit to the index system, then in temporary accommodation in Piccadilly, Manchester, where he met an older woman who took him to her flat in Ardwick where she seduced him.

== Statistics ==
In 1968 it was recorded that the adult lending stock was 895,000, the adult reference stock 638,200, the junior stock 114,600, a total of nearly 1.65 million volumes. There were about 2,000 reading places and an estimated 10,000 people visited the library each day. There were subscriptions to 3,000 periodicals.

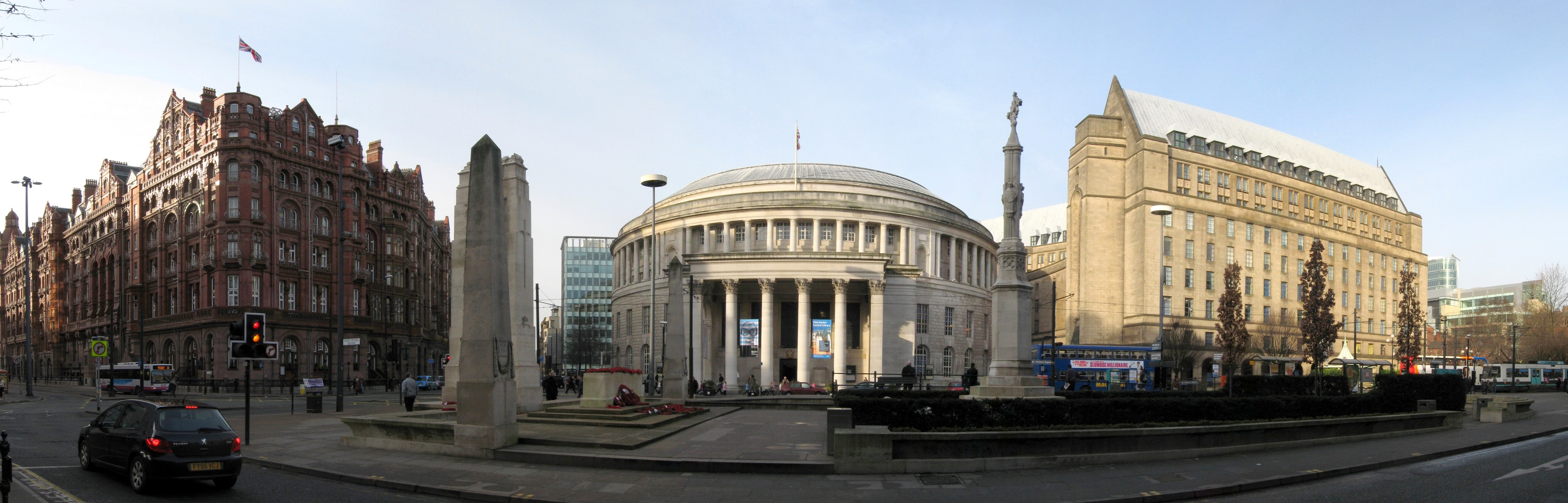
A panoramic view of St Peter's Square. From the far left to right: Midland Hotel, Manchester Central Library (before the current alterations), and Manchester Town Hall Extension.

== See also ==
- Grade II* listed buildings in Greater Manchester
- John Rylands Library
- Listed buildings in Manchester-M2
