= X1 Michigan Towers =

Residential development under construction in Salford Quays, England

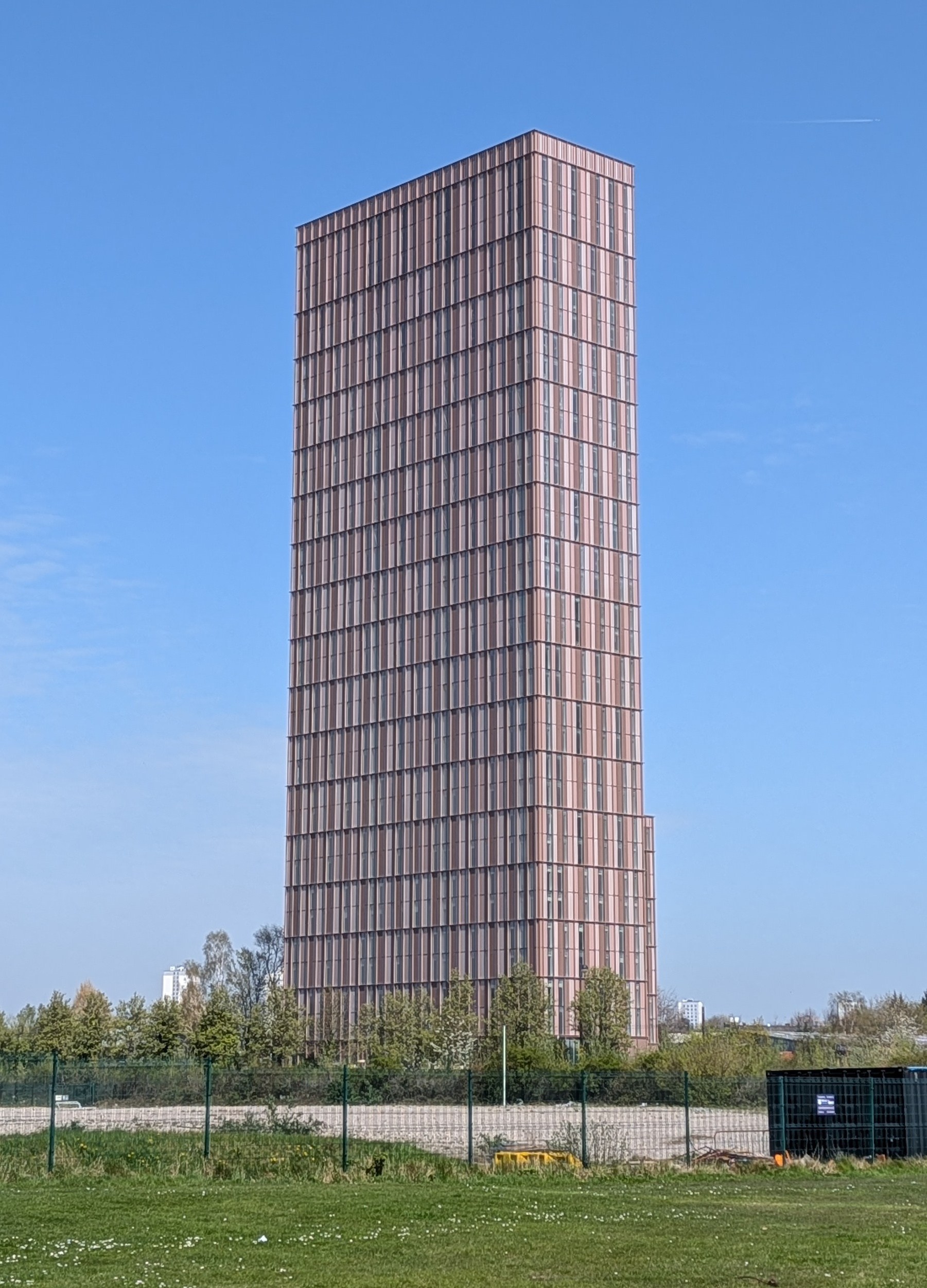
- Building 3 in April 2026

- Location within Greater Manchester
- Former names: X1 MediaCityUK Phase II

General information
- Status: Building 3: topped out
- Type: Residential
- Location: Michigan Avenue, Salford Quays, Greater Manchester, England
- Coordinates: 53.4748°N 2.2936°W
- Construction started: Building 3: 2024; 2 years ago
- Estimated completion: Building 3: 2026
- Owner: X1 Developments

Height
- Height: Building 1: 44.3 m (145 ft) (proposed); Building 2: 96.8 m (318 ft) (proposed); Building 3: 109 m (358 ft); Building 4: 126.5 m (415 ft) (proposed)

Technical details
- Floor count: Building 1: 14 (proposed); Building 2: 31 (proposed); Building 3: 35; Building 4: 41 (proposed)

Design and construction
- Architect: Jeffrey Bell Architects
- Other designers: Gillespies (landscape)
- Main contractor: Vermont Construction

Website
- Developer website

X1 Michigan Towers is a residential development under construction on Michigan Avenue in Salford Quays, Greater Manchester, England. When complete, the scheme will comprise just over 1,300 homes across a cluster of four buildings ranging from 14 to 41 storeys.

Building 3, at 109 metres (358 ft), topped out in January 2026 and is expected to become the fifth-tallest building in Salford and the 25th-tallest in Greater Manchester when it is completed later in 2026. It is the second‑tallest of the four proposed towers in the X1 Michigan Towers development.

== History ==
=== Planning ===
An outline planning application was submitted to Salford City Council by landowner Peel Land and Property in 2019 for a residential-led development comprising residential use, co-living accommodation and student accommodation. Outline approval was granted in October of that year. The proposal included an option to build up to a maximum height of 162 metres (531 ft) or 46 storeys, later reduced to 126.5 m (415 ft).

After acquiring the site from Peel, developer X1 Developments submitted a reserved matters application in 2020 for 1,314 homes across four buildings. Planning approval was granted in July 2020.

=== Construction ===
Construction of Building 3 (109 m (358 ft)) began in 2024, topped out in January 2026, and is expected to be completed later in 2026. The full scheme is anticipated to be delivered over a seven-year period, with completion estimated in 2031. The tallest tower is expected to form the third phase, although a timescale for this phase has not yet been announced.

== Facilities ==
Broadway tram stop on the Eccles Line of the Metrolink system is located close to X1 Michigan Towers.

== Gallery ==
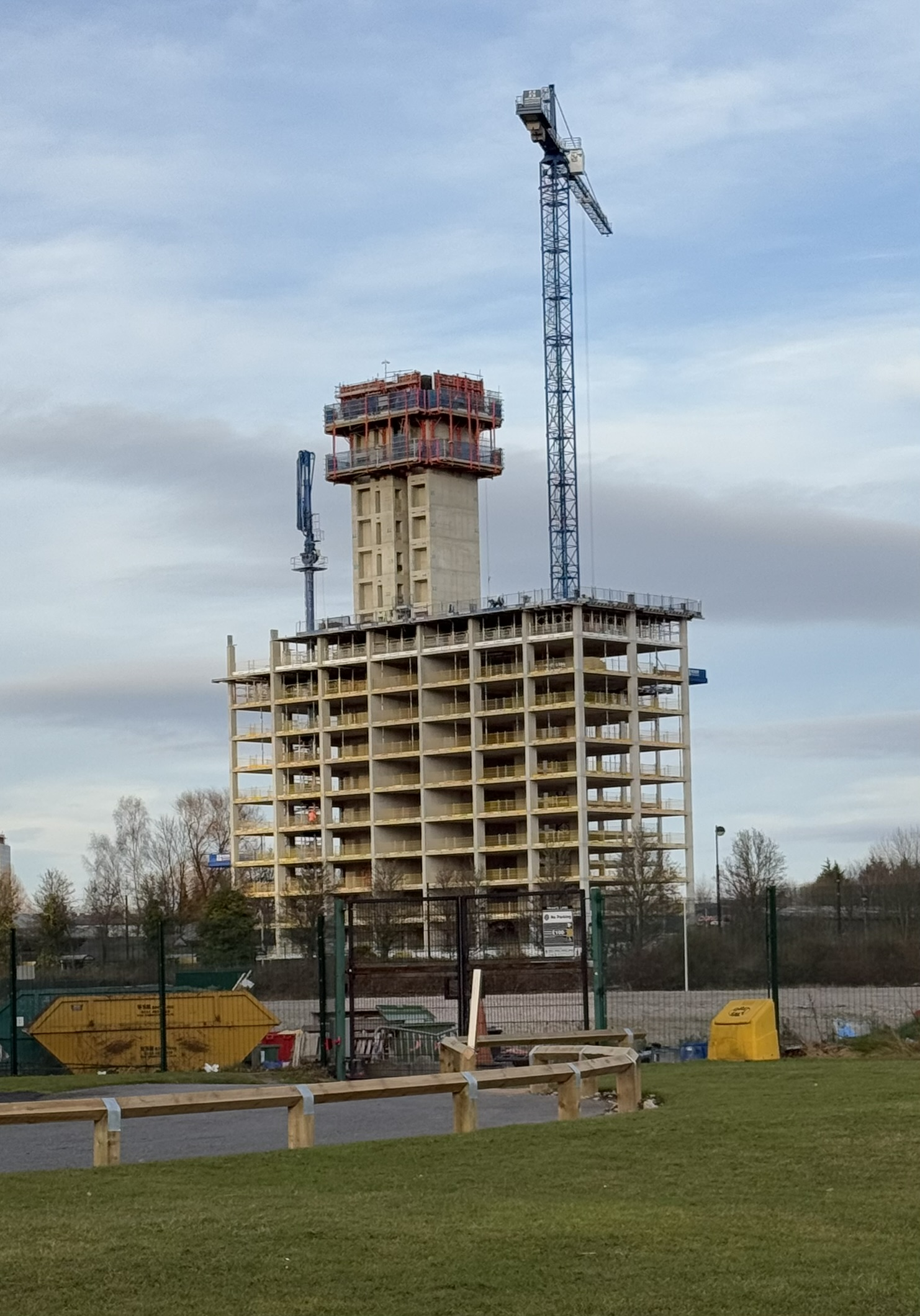
Building 3, February 2025

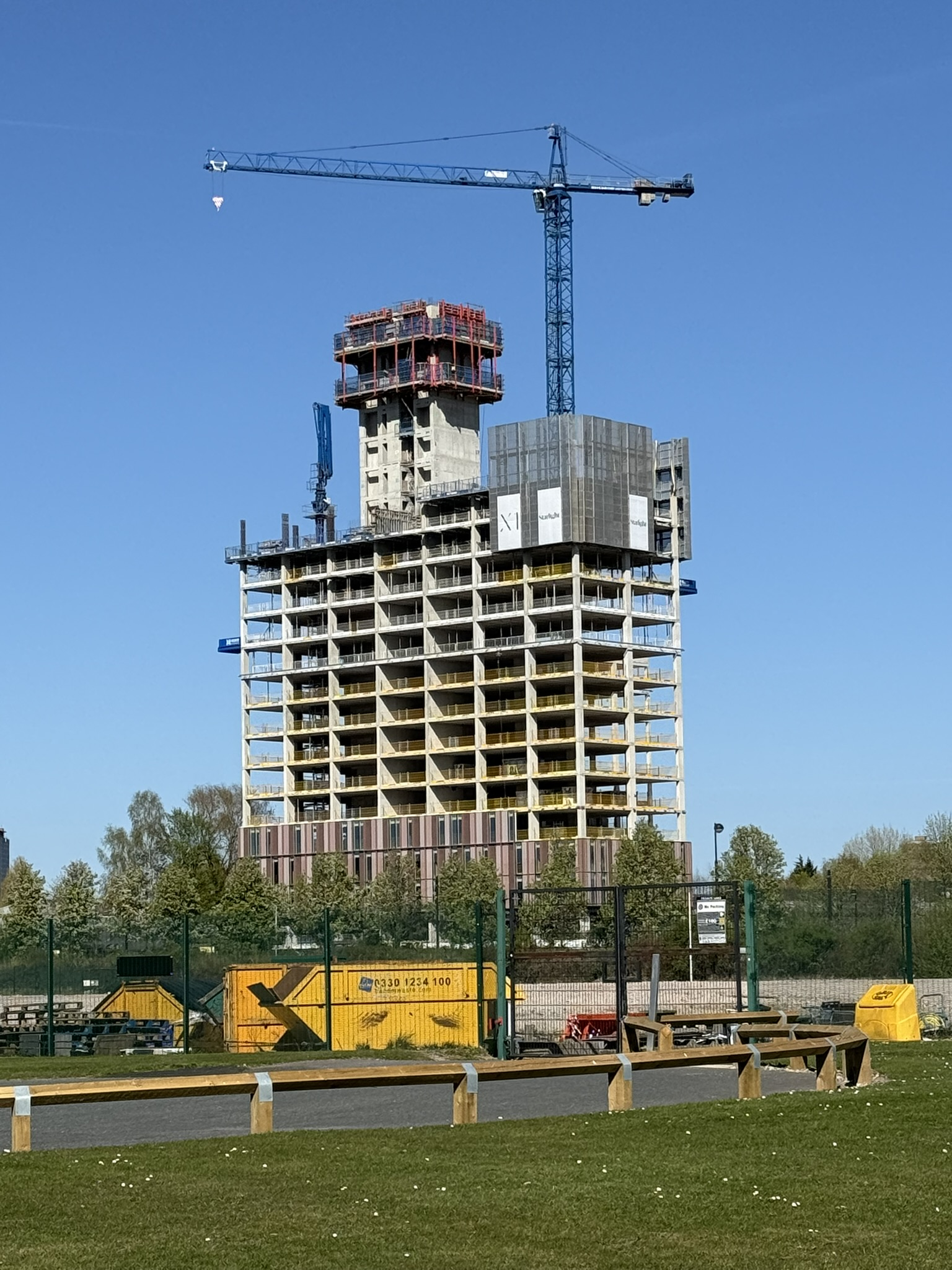
Building 3, April 2025

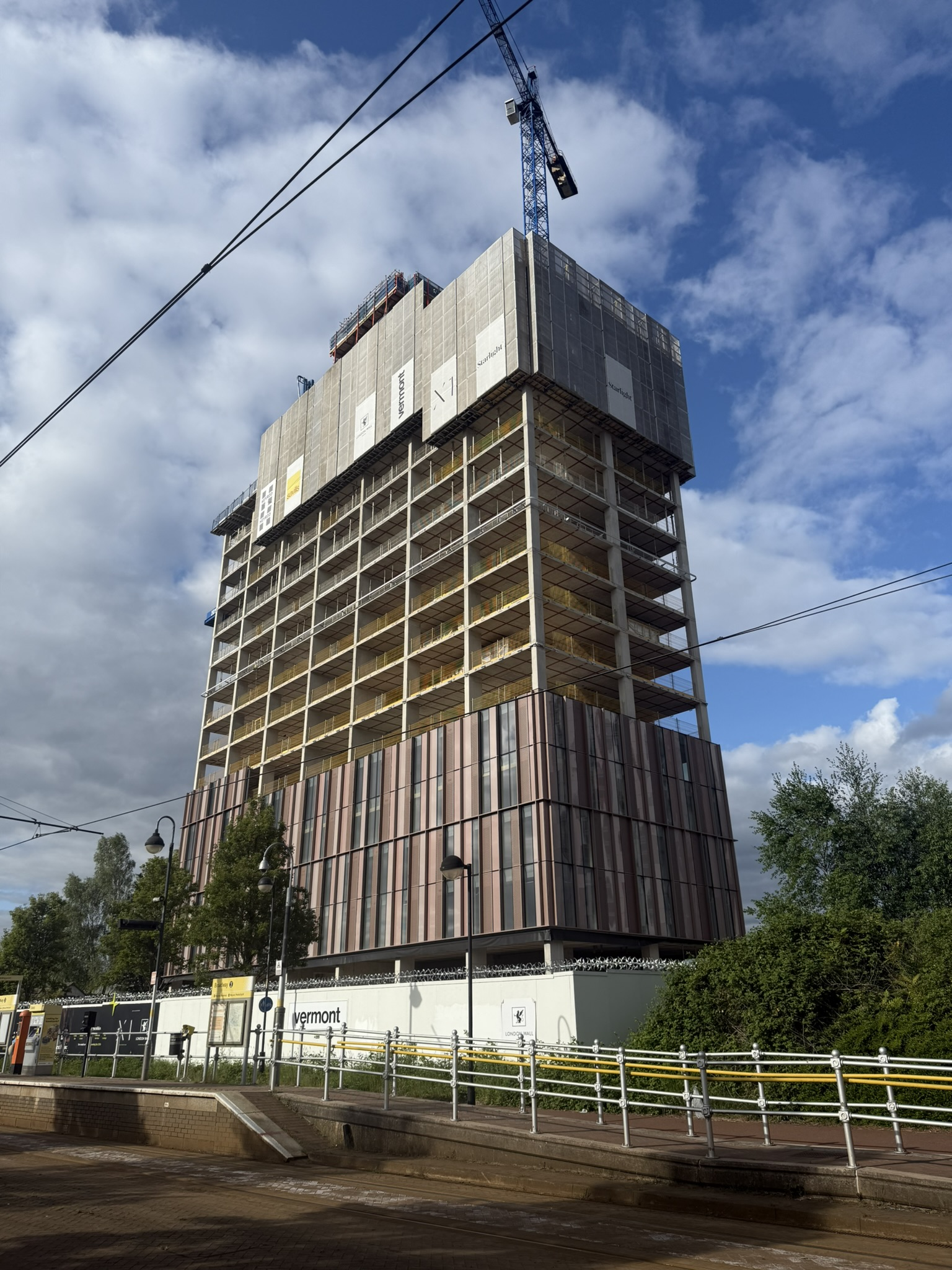
Building 3, May 2025

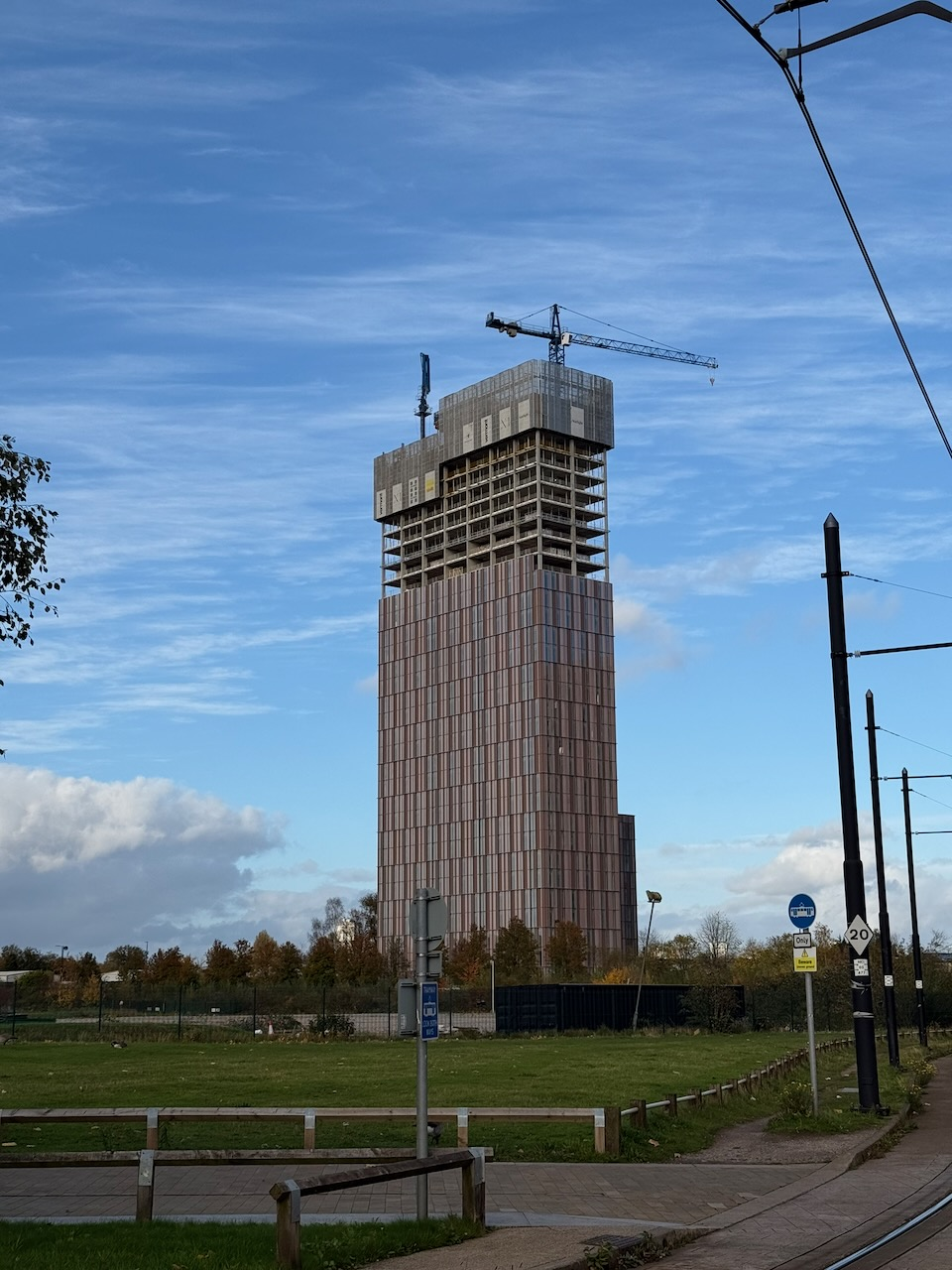
Building 3, November 2025

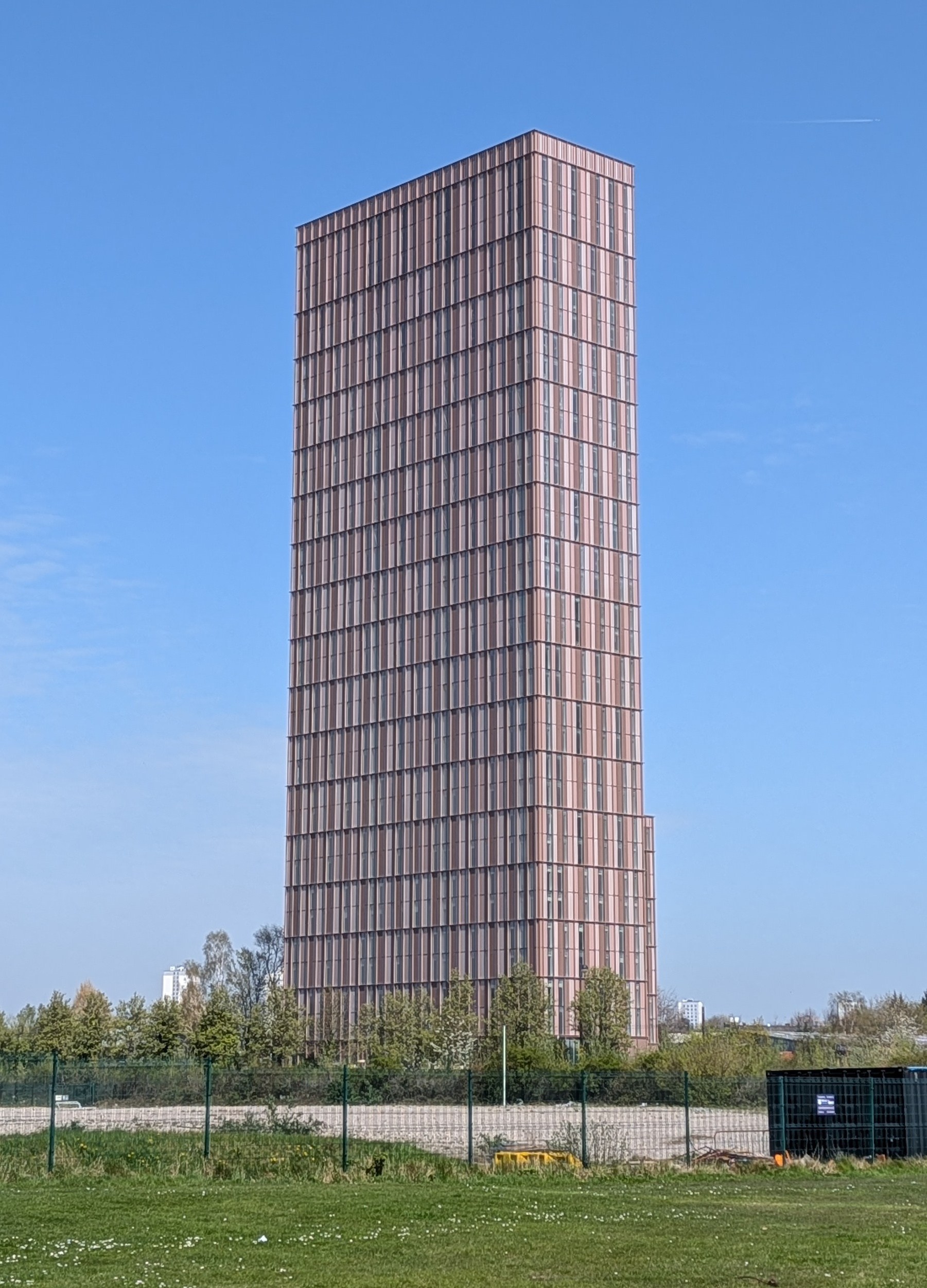
Building 3, April 2026

== See also ==
- List of tallest buildings and structures in Greater Manchester
- MediaCityUK, a nearby mixed-use property development
- X1 Media City, an adjoining development of four 26-storey residential blocks
