= Media City Footbridge =

MediaCityUK Footbridge
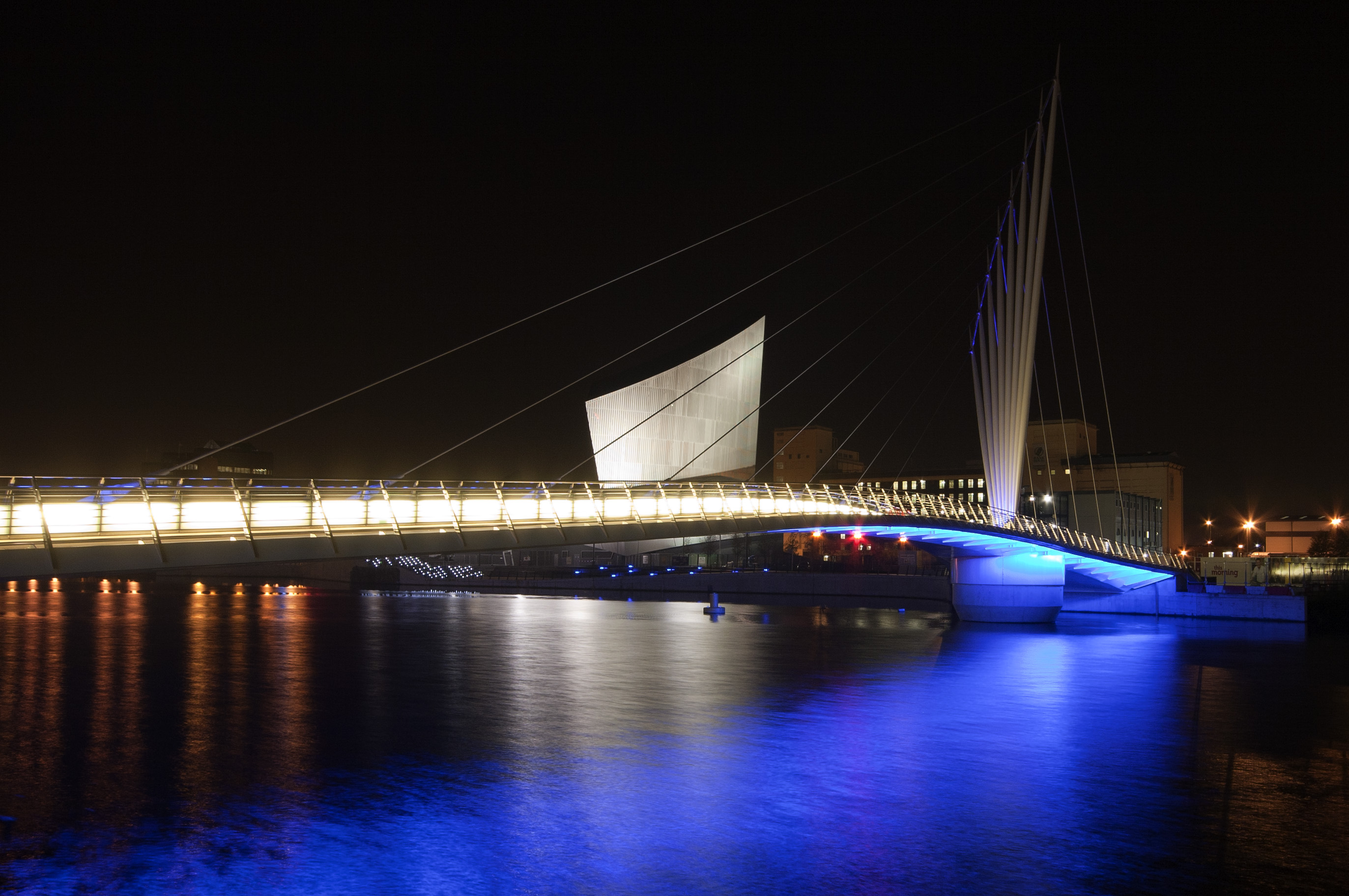
- MediaCityUK Footbridge at night
- Coordinates: 53°28′17″N 2°18′00″W
- Carries: Pedestrians
- Crosses: Manchester Ship Canal
- Locale: MediaCityUK, Salford Quays
- Other name(s): Salford Quays Swing Bridge
- Owner: The Peel Group

Characteristics
- Design: Cable-stay swing bridge
- Material: Steel
- Total length: 83 metres (272 ft)
- Width: 6–19 metres (20–62 ft)
- Height: 31 metres (102 ft)
- Longest span: 65 metres (213 ft)
- No. of spans: 2
- Piers in water: 1
- Clearance above: 48 metres (157 ft)
- Clearance below: 4.77 metres (15.6 ft)

History
- Architect: WilkinsonEyre
- Designer: Gifford (structure), Pinniger (lighting)
- Engineering design by: Bennett Associates (Atkins) KGAL
- Constructed by: Balfour Beatty Civil Engineering Ltd
- Fabrication by: Rowecord Engineering
- Construction start: September 2009
- Construction end: 2011
- Construction cost: £11 million
- Opened: 2011

The Media City Footbridge is a swing-mechanism footbridge over the Manchester Ship Canal near MediaCityUK. It is an asymmetric cable-stayed swing bridge and was completed in 2011. It was designed by Gifford (now part of Ramboll) and WilkinsonEyre.

The pedestrian bridge links MediaCityUK with the Imperial War Museum North on Trafford Wharf. It weighs 450 tonnes, and has two spans of 65 and 18 metres (213 and 59 ft). It swings through 71 degrees to give a 48-metre (157 ft) navigation channel. The deck of the bridge is an orthotropic steel box. The bridge is supported by eight tapered steel fanned masts. It was built by Balfour Beatty, with the steel fabrication by Rowecord Engineering of Newport, South Wales. The swing mechanism is built on a reinforced concrete caisson foundation of 13 metres (43 ft) diameter. Above the water it is 7.3 metres (24 ft) in diameter.

== See also ==
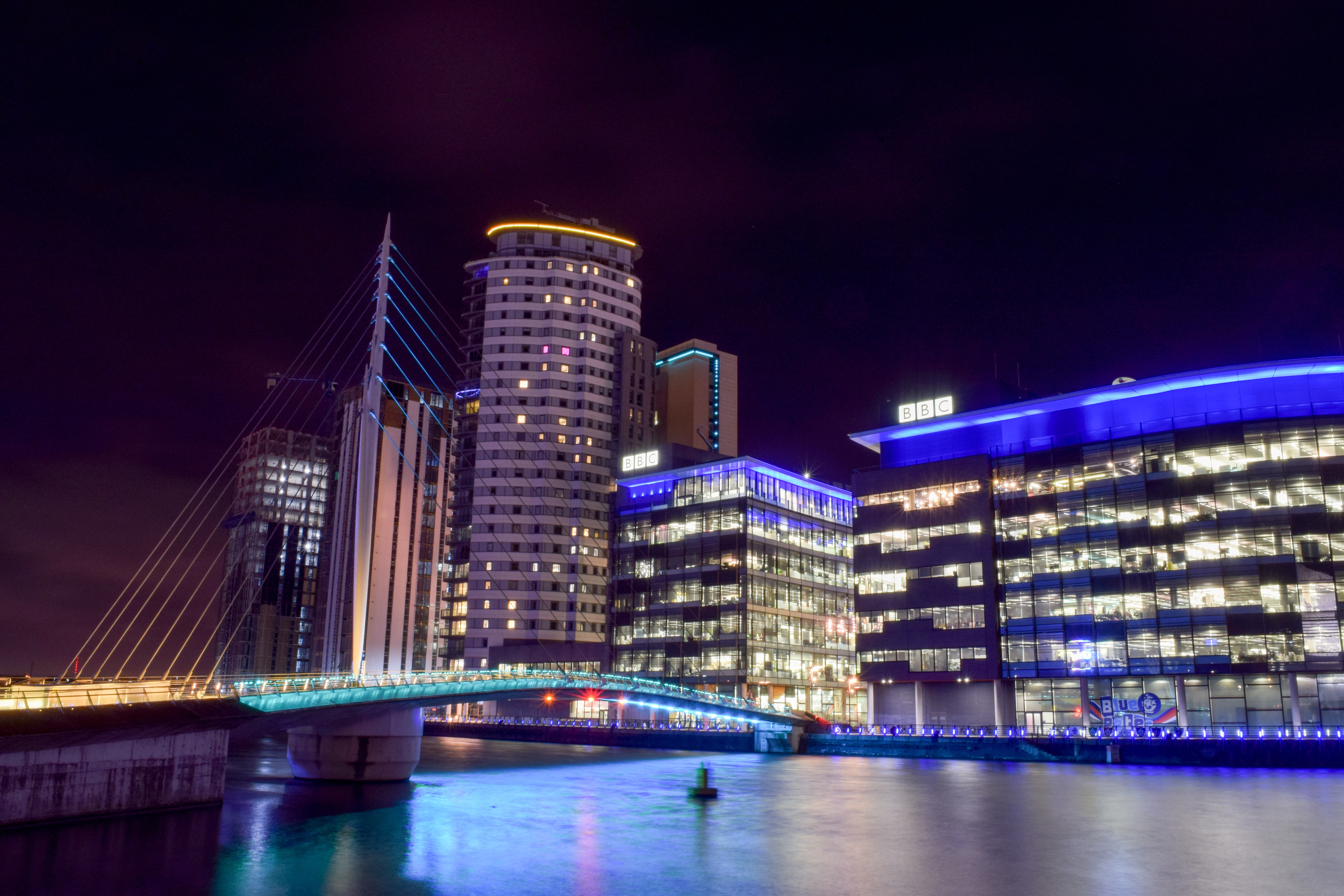
The MediaCityUK Footbridge seen at night during the MediaCityUK Lightwaves Festival 2018 from the southern bank looking north-west towards the BBC buildings.

- Salford Quays lift bridge
