= Soapworks =

High-rise office building in Manchester, England

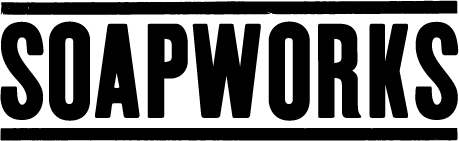
- Soapworks logo

General information
- Type: High-rise office
- Architectural style: Modern Industrial
- Location: Salford Quays, England
- Current tenants: Home Office TalkTalk Group
- Cost: £25 million

Height
- Height: 70 feet

Technical details
- Floor count: 5 Floors
- Floor area: 230,000 Square Feet

Design and construction
- Architects: Shedkm & Chapman Taylor

Website
- https://www.soapworks.co.uk/

Soapworks is a high-rise office building in Salford Quays in Greater Manchester, England. It was designed by architects Shedkm in 2005, with an expansion beginning in 2026 led by Chapman Taylor. The Home Office operates a major regional Digital, Data and Technology (DDaT) Hub at Soapworks with hundreds of staff.

== History ==
The original factory was built in 1874 by Charles Goodwin before becoming the home to Colgate-Palmolive in 1938. During the Second world war the factory made hygiene kits for troops and by the 1950s was a European hub for Palmolive soap and Colgate's mint toothpaste. The factory closed in 2005. In 2014 the location was redeveloped as an industrial theamed grade A office space under a £25 million planned redevelopment.

== Occupancy ==
In 2015 the Home Office agreed alongside TalkTalk Group to occupy offices in the location; this began in 2016. The Home office purchased further office space in 2019 expanding into the boilerhouse making the Sopaworks the largest Home office location outside london with hundreds of civil servants based in salford.

== Gateway expanstion ==
Future development of Block D is envisaged, with planning permission secured in 2025. The expansion is due to begin in 2026 costing an estimated £200 million.
