= Salford Quays lift bridge =

Millennium Bridge
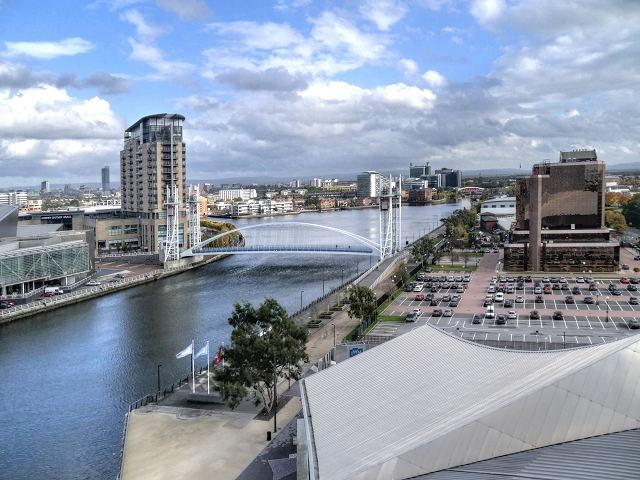
- The bridge and Salford Quays
- Coordinates: 53°28′11″N 2°17′44″W
- Carries: Pedestrians
- Crosses: Manchester Ship Canal
- Preceded by: Media City Footbridge
- Followed by: Railway swing bridge

Characteristics
- Design: vertical lift bridge
- Total length: 91.2 metres (299 ft)

History
- Engineering design by: Parkman of Manchester
- Constructed by: Carlos Fernandez Casado
- Opened: 2000

The Salford Quays lift bridge, also known as the Salford Quays Millennium footbridge or the Lowry bridge, is a 91.2-metre (299 ft) long vertical lift bridge spanning the Manchester Ship Canal between Salford and Trafford in Greater Manchester, England. The pedestrian bridge, which was completed in 2000, is near the terminus of the ship canal at the old Manchester Docks. It is sited beside The Lowry theatre and gallery and links Salford Quays and MediaCityUK to Trafford Wharf and the Imperial War Museum North. It has a lift of 18 metres (59 ft), allowing large watercraft to pass beneath.

The bridge features prominently on the backdrop for the BBC North West Tonight television news programme, which also shows The Lowry and MediaCityUK.

== Design ==
The project started in 1998 and was project managed and designed by Parkman Ltd of Manchester, with Carlos Fernandez Casado as subcontract architect/engineer who designed the main span. The bridge has a main span of 91.2 metres (299 ft) in a Lohse Arch, with the peaks of the twin arches connected at the crown. These brace one another, resulting in greater structural rigidity. The deck is connected to the arches with vertical members, which splay outwards at an increasing angle towards the centre of the span. The sweeping arches are decorated with coloured Philips Color Kinetics LED lighting, while the deck is illuminated with white downlighting. Pedestrians are protected from the prevailing winds by fritted glass sides which also provide stability against wind induced oscillations, coloured blue at foot level and tapering in, following the angle of the arches. The glazed parapet is configured to provide stability during wind loading during lift mode and was modelled in a wind tunnel at Liverpool University aeronautics department.

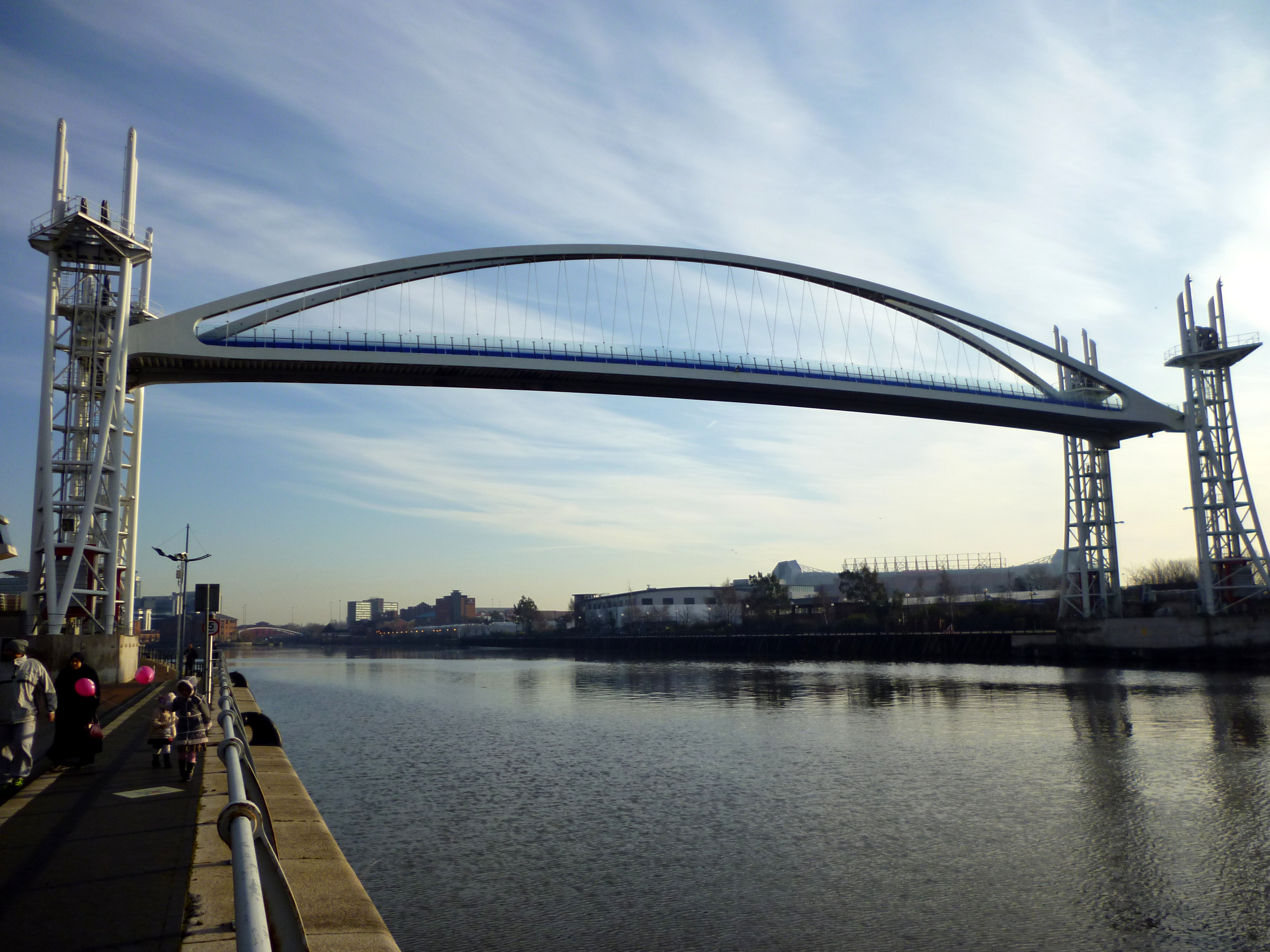
The bridge fully raised to allow a ship passage, 2012

The lifting design utilises four white tubular steel space truss towers with cast steel counterweights mounted internally on red carriers, although early plans envisioned spherical counterweights. This design was modified by Parkman Ltd following a value management exercise to align the design with the available budget. These are suspended by cable over large grey wheels, mounted above decorative triangular maintenance platforms. The counterbalancing system allows the bridge to complete a raising or lowering through its 18-metre (59 ft) lift in less than three minutes. The outermost truss sections of each tower curve away from the main bridge at the base, tapering to a point, and each tower is topped with two decorative blue lights. The four towers have uplighting from the maintenance platform, although this feature has not been operational for some time. The bridge has a 'sister' by the same designer, in Plentzia, north of Bilbao, Spain. While slightly larger than its Salford Quays counterpart, spanning 108 metres (354 ft) over the Plentzia River, it does not lift and has no towers.

== Construction ==
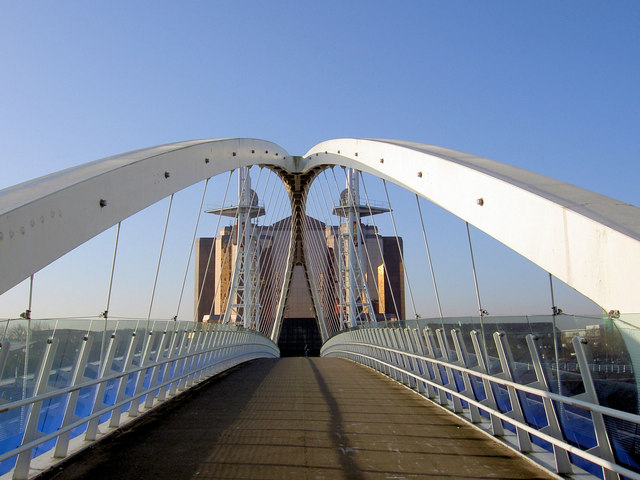
On the deck of the bridge

The bridge was built by Christiani & Nielsen as the general contractor, who coordinated a 'float-in' installation of the operable span with freight transport specialist Econofreight. The movable span was winched into place between the four support towers from a barge. The approximate cost was USA $7.5 million at the time of construction.

The deck is an orthotropic design, which is structurally more efficient than a concrete deck on top of steel deck beams. Orthotropic steel deck systems have begun to dominate movable spans in Europe because smaller towers and lifting mechanisms are required, using less energy to move them. Similar systems are used for welded steel ships and canal lock doors.

The lifting system itself was designed and installed by Bennett Associates, also responsible for the tilting mechanism on the Gateshead Millennium Bridge. The system normally operates from the electrical grid, although it has a diesel backup system in case of a power failure.

== Operation ==
The control tower is on the Salford Quays side of the ship canal, from where the pedestrian barriers and lifting mechanism are operated. Few large ships venture this far up the canal nowadays and the bridge is rarely raised as a result. Except for Royal Navy visits and dredging, most vessels entering the Salford Quays turning circle are pleasure craft, and are most commonly seen between April and October, when Mersey Ferries operate the Manchester Ship Canal Cruise service from Liverpool to Salford Quays.
