= X1 Media City =

Residential development under construction in Salford Quays, England

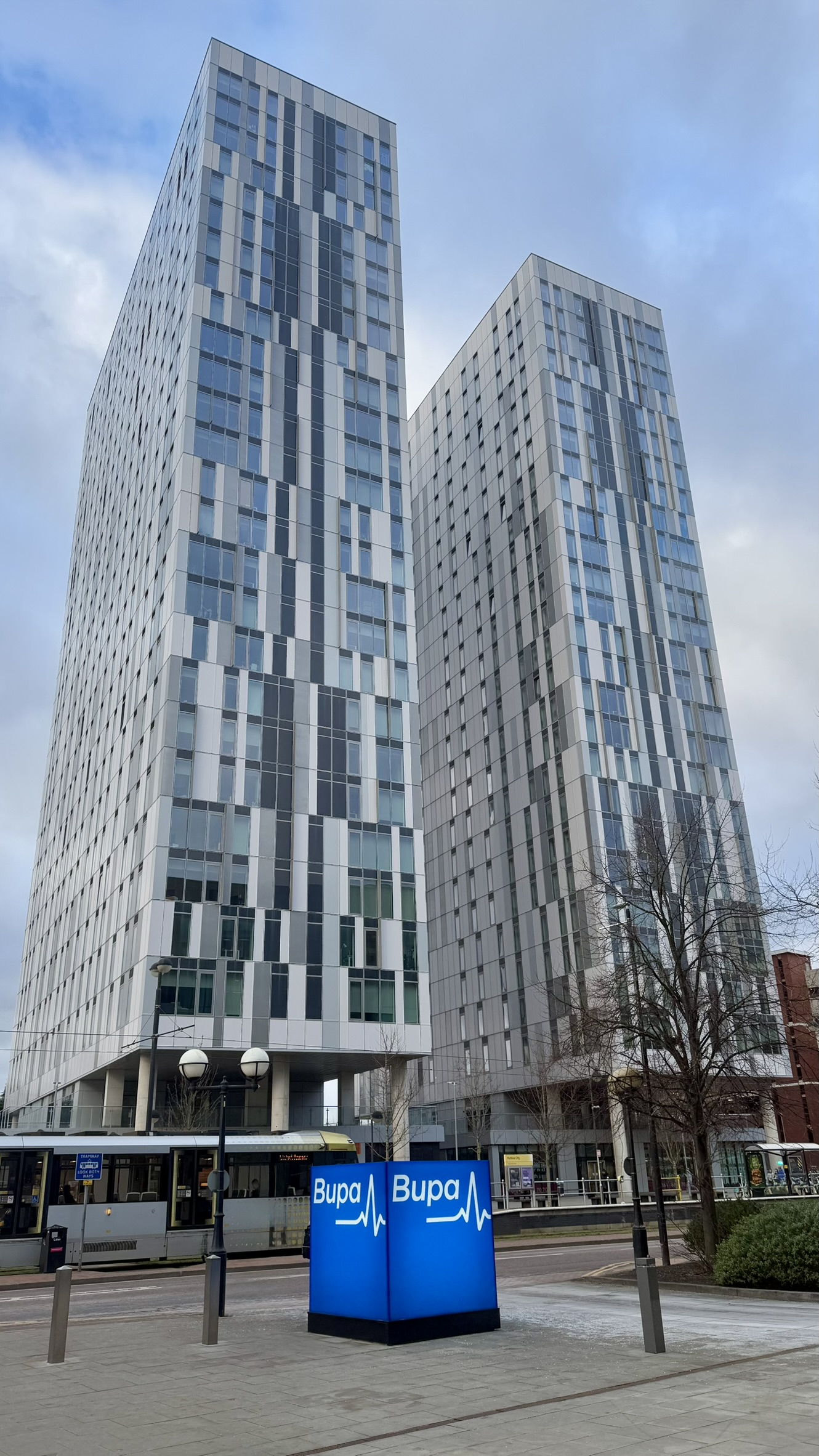
- X1 Media City Towers 1 and 2 in February 2025

- Location within Greater Manchester

General information
- Status: Towers 1–3: complete Tower 4: under construction
- Type: Residential high-rises
- Location: Michigan Avenue, Salford Quays, Greater Manchester, England
- Coordinates: 53.47426°N 2.29125°W
- Years built: Tower 1: 2015–2017; 9 years ago Tower 2: 2017–2019; 7 years ago Tower 3: 2019–2023; 3 years ago
- Construction started: Tower 4: 2025
- Completed: Tower 1: 2017; Tower 2: 2019; Tower 3: 2023; Tower 4: est. 2027
- Cost: £200 million
- Owner: X1 Developments; Knight Knox

Height
- Height: Towers 1–3: 85 m (277 ft)

Technical details
- Floor count: Towers 1–3: 26

Design and construction
- Architects: AHR; Falconer Chester Hall
- Main contractor: Vermont Construction

Website
- Developer website

X1 Media City is a residential development on Michigan Avenue in Salford Quays, Greater Manchester, England. When fully completed, the scheme will comprise four identical high-rise towers, each 85 metres (277 ft) and 26-storeys, containing 275 apartments per tower (1,100 in total). Towers 1–3 have been constructed, completing in 2017, 2019 and 2023 respectively. Construction of Tower 4 had commenced by May 2025.

The towers were originally designed by architects AHR, with Falconer Chester Hall being brought on as designers following planning consent.

== History ==
=== Planning ===
The original planning application for four 26-storey buildings comprising 1,036 apartments was submitted to Salford City Council in October 2006, with a further application submitted in April 2010 to extend the time to implement the original planning permission. In May 2015, an amendment application was submitted to increase the number of apartments to 1,100. Planning approval was obtained in September 2015.

=== Construction ===
Construction of Tower 1 commenced in 2015 and was completed in 2017. Work on Tower 2 began in 2017 and finished in 2019. Construction of Tower 3 began in 2019; by February 2023, the floors up to level 13 were complete, with work continuing on the upper levels. By June 2023, the structure was largely finished, with only the Level 1 amenity spaces remaining incomplete. Construction of Tower 4, the final phase of the development, began in early 2025 and is scheduled for completion in 2027.

In July 2026, it was reported that the special‑purpose vehicle responsible for X1 Media City entered administration after completing three of the four planned towers. The final tower had not progressed beyond ground works, leaving the position of investors who paid deposits unresolved pending the administrators' report.

== Facilities ==
The towers contain a mix of studio, one, two, and three-bedroom apartments. The first and second floors accommodate commercial and retail units. In total, the scheme will provide approximately 1,100 apartments and includes private underground parking. Shared amenities across the towers include an on-site cinema, private gym, landscaped public spaces, and secure entry systems.

Harbour City tram stop on the Eccles Line of the Metrolink system is located directly outside X1 Media City.

== Gallery ==
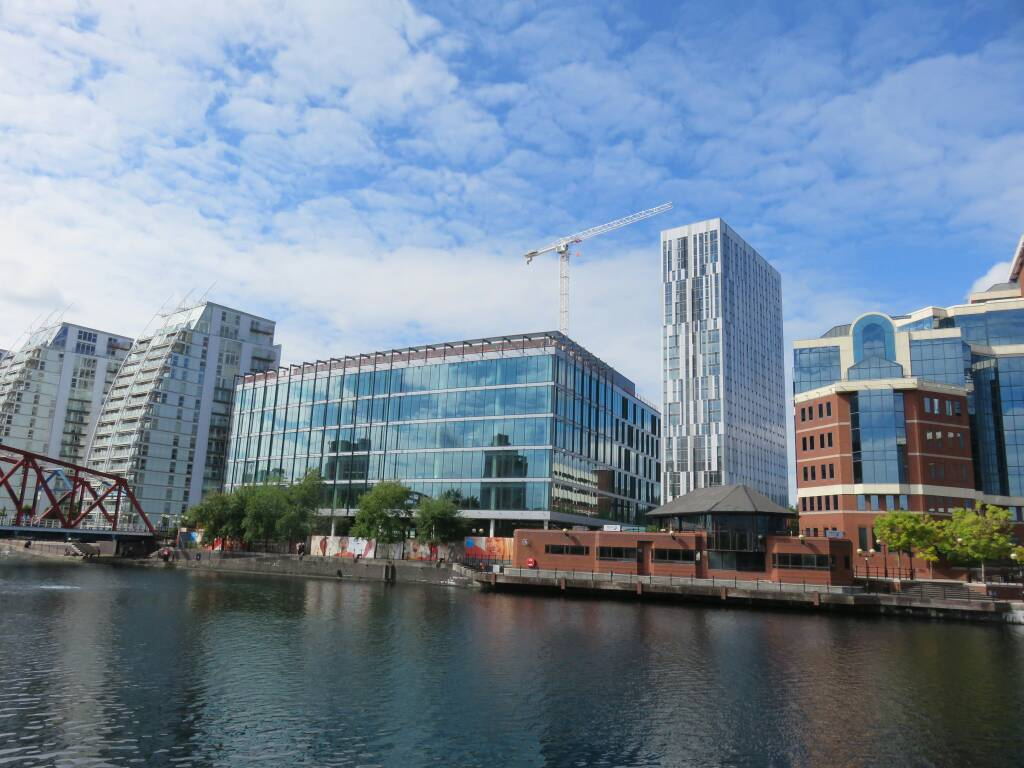
X1 Media City Tower 1, to the right of the tower crane

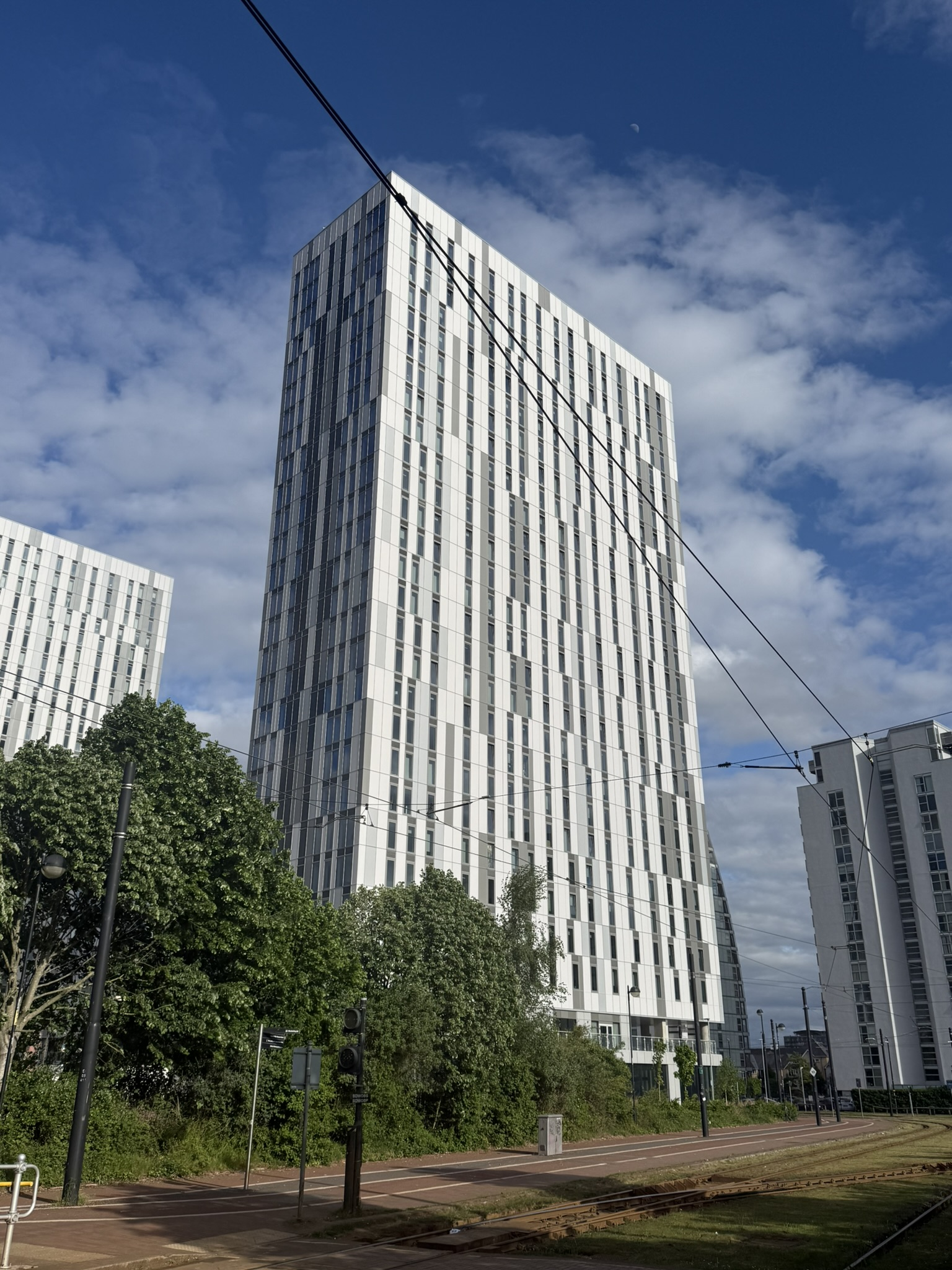
X1 Media City Tower 3 in May 2025

== See also ==
- List of tallest buildings and structures in Greater Manchester
- MediaCityUK
