= Salford Quays =

Area of Salford, Greater Manchester, England

Coordinates: 53°28′16″N 2°17′35″W

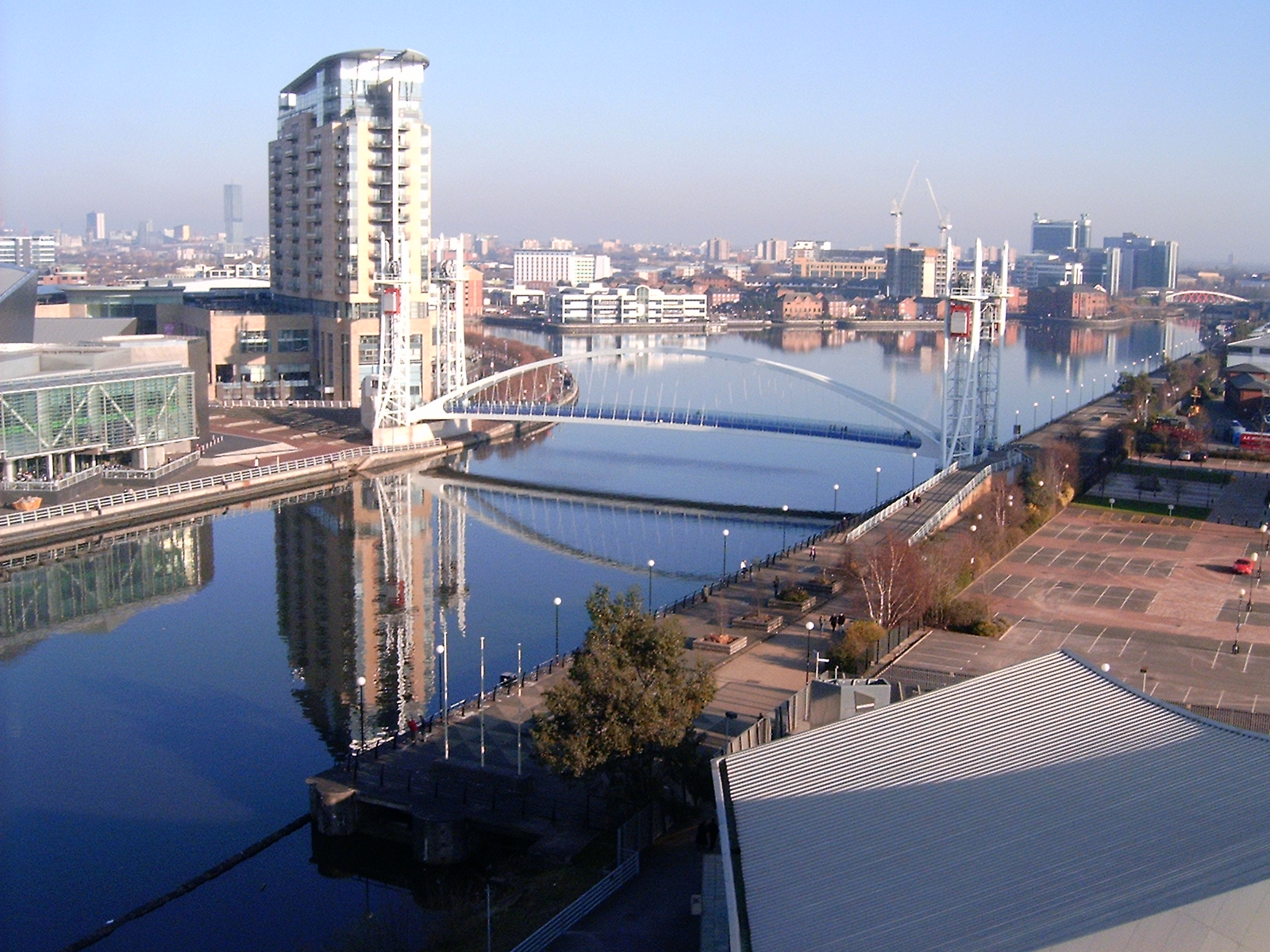
- Salford Quays and Manchester Ship Canal (looking east)

- Location within Greater Manchester
- OS grid reference: SJ807972
- Metropolitan borough: Salford
- Metropolitan county: Greater Manchester
- Region: North West
- Country: England
- Sovereign state: United Kingdom
- Post town: SALFORD
- Postcode district: M5, M50
- Post town: MANCHESTER
- Postcode district: M16, M17
- Dialling code: 0161
- Police: Greater Manchester
- Fire: Greater Manchester
- Ambulance: North West
- UK Parliament: Salford

Salford Quays is an area of Salford, Greater Manchester, England, near the end of the Manchester Ship Canal. Previously the site of Manchester Docks, it faces Trafford across the canal.

== History ==
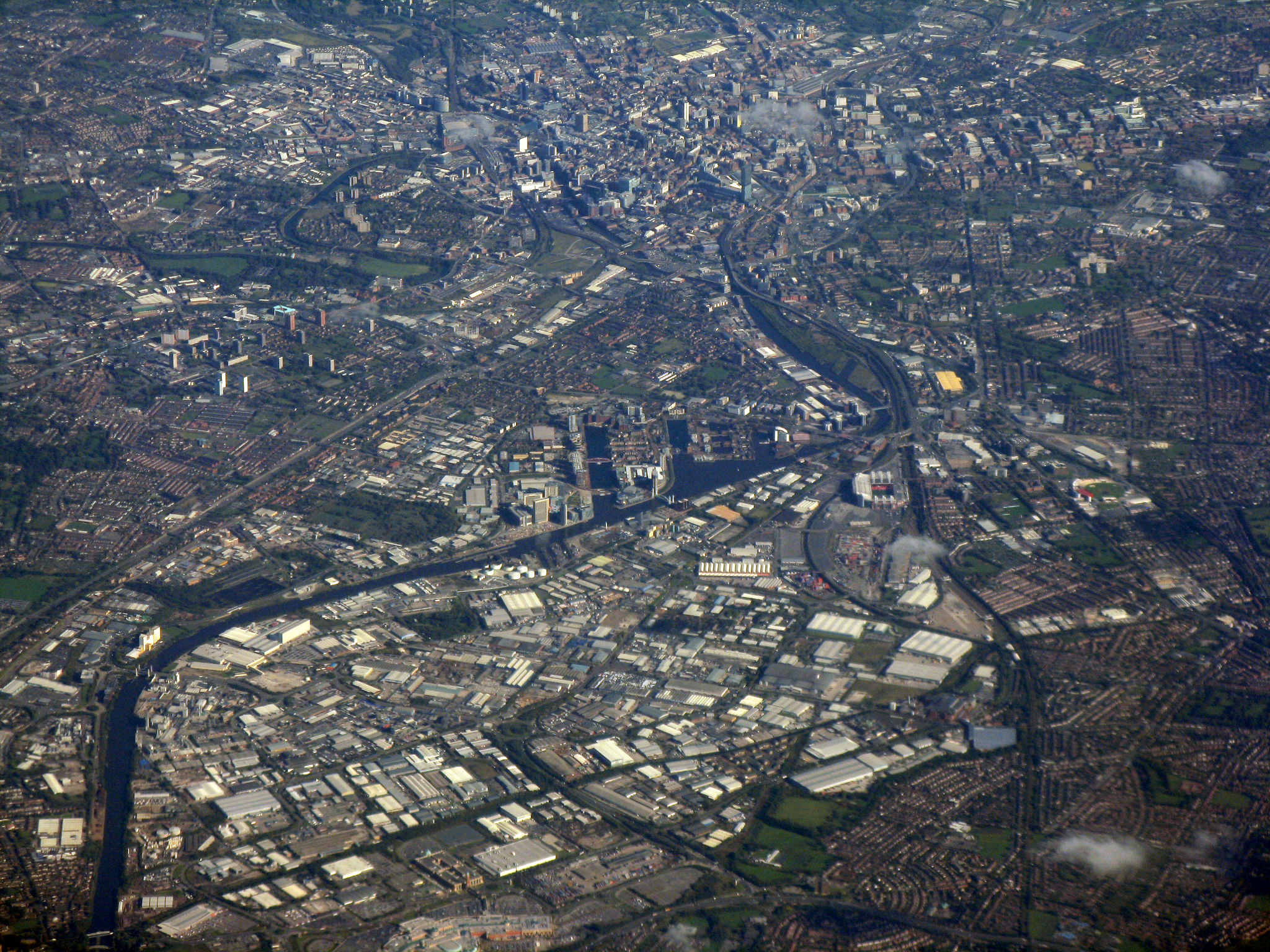
Aerial photograph showing Salford Quays with Manchester (top) and Trafford (bottom)

Built by the Manchester Ship Canal Company, Salford Docks was the larger of two that made up Manchester Docks, the other being Pomona Docks to the east, which opened in 1903. They were opened in 1894 by Queen Victoria and spanned 120 acres (49 ha) of water and 1,000 acres (400 ha) of land. At their height, the Manchester Docks was the third-busiest port in Britain, but after containerisation and the limit placed on vessel size on the Manchester Ship Canal, the docks declined in the 1970s. They closed in 1982, resulting in the loss of 3,000 jobs.

In 1983, Salford City Council acquired parts of the docks covering 220 acres (90 ha) from the Manchester Ship Canal Company with the aid of a derelict land grant. The area was rebranded as Salford Quays and redevelopment by Urban Waterside began in 1985 under the Salford Quays Development Plan. Faced with major pollution issues from the quality of the water in the ship canal, dams were built to isolate the docks, after which water quality was improved by aerating it using a compressed air mixing system. Within two years the quality was sufficient to introduce 12,000 coarse fish, which have thrived in the environment. Water quality is monitored fortnightly by scientists from APEM, the Manchester University Aquatic Pollution and Environmental Monitoring Unit, and the improved habitat has been recognised by the Angling Foundation and the Institute of Fisheries Management.

Between 1986 and 1990, the infrastructure of the docks was modified to create an internal waterway network. Roads and bridges were built and a promenade along the waterfront constructed and landscaped. Moorings and watersports facilities were provided and a railway swing bridge moved to cross Dock 9. A hotel, cinema, housing, offices were built on Piers 5 and 6 followed by more developments on Pier 7. Public funding and private investment totalled around £280 million by the early 1990s.

== Governance ==
=== Councillors ===
Seat created in 2021

Election	Councillor	Councillor	Councillor
2021	Jake Rowland (Lab)	Phil Tresadern (Lab)	Ann-Marie Humphreys (Lab)
2022	Jake Rowland (Lab)	Alex Warren (Lib Dem)	Ann-Marie Humphreys (Lab)
2023	Jake Rowland (Lab)	Alex Warren (Lib Dem)	Ann-Marie Humphreys (Lab)
2024	Jake Rowland (Lab)	*Paul Heilbron (Lib Dem)	Jonathan Moore (Lib Dem)
2026	Jake Rowland (Lab)	Andrea O’Brien (Green)	Jonathan Moore (Lib Dem)

== Landmarks ==
=== The Lowry ===
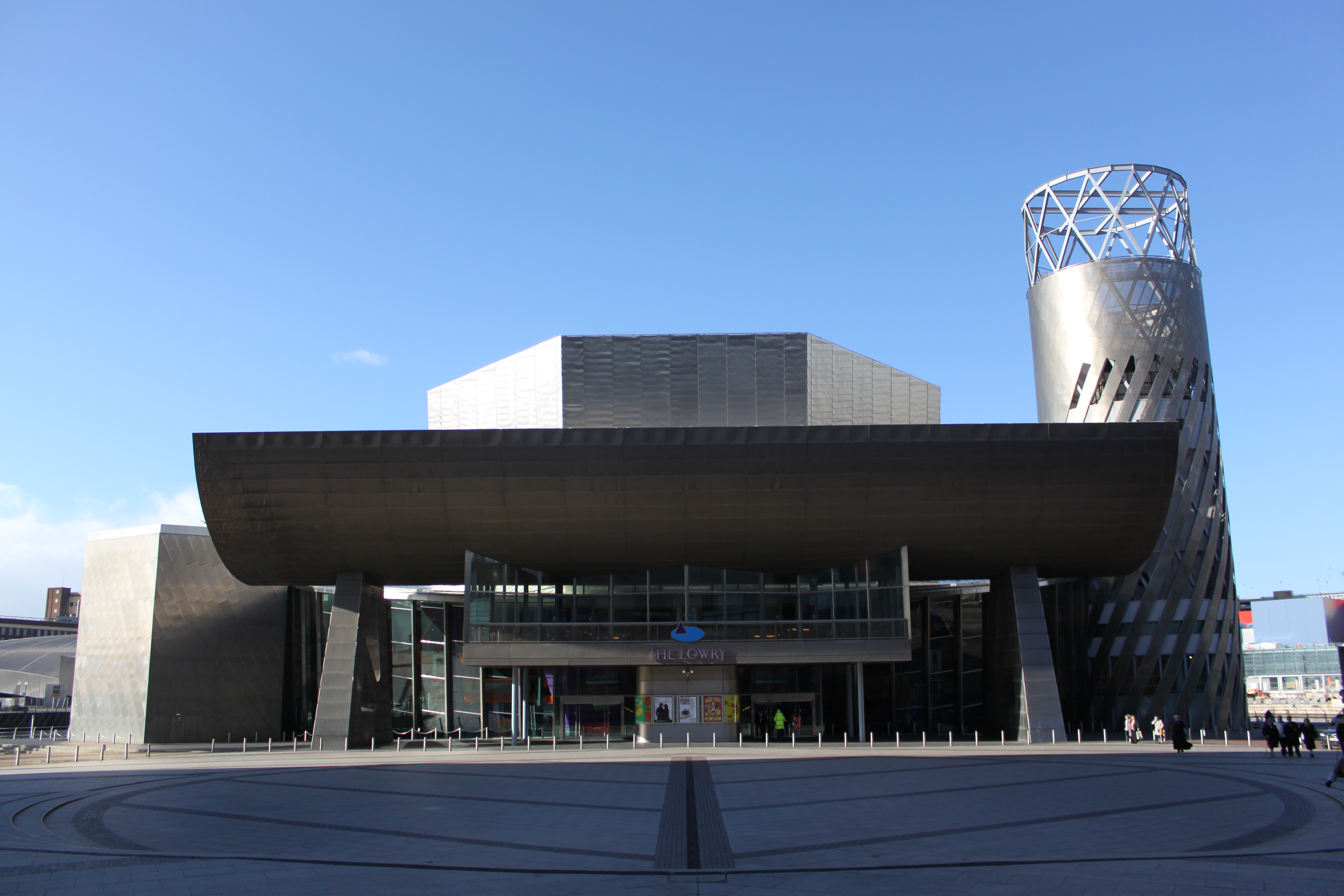
The Lowry Theatre, designed by Michael Wilford.

Early in the planning stages for redevelopment of Salford Quays in 1988, potential was recognised for a landmark arts venue, the Salford Quays Centre for the Performing Arts, which became known as the Lowry Project in 1994. It had secured £64 million in funding by 22 February 1996.

The Lowry stands at the end of Pier 8, largely surrounded by the waters of the Manchester Ship Canal. Designed by James Stirling and Michael Wilford, it opened on 28 April 2000 and houses the 1,730 seat Lyric theatre, the 466 seat Quays theatre, studio spaces and 17,330 sq ft (1,610 m^{2}) of gallery space. There are cafes, bars and a restaurant at the south-western end of the building. The centre is associated with L. S. Lowry, and houses a collection of his work.

=== Imperial War Museum North ===
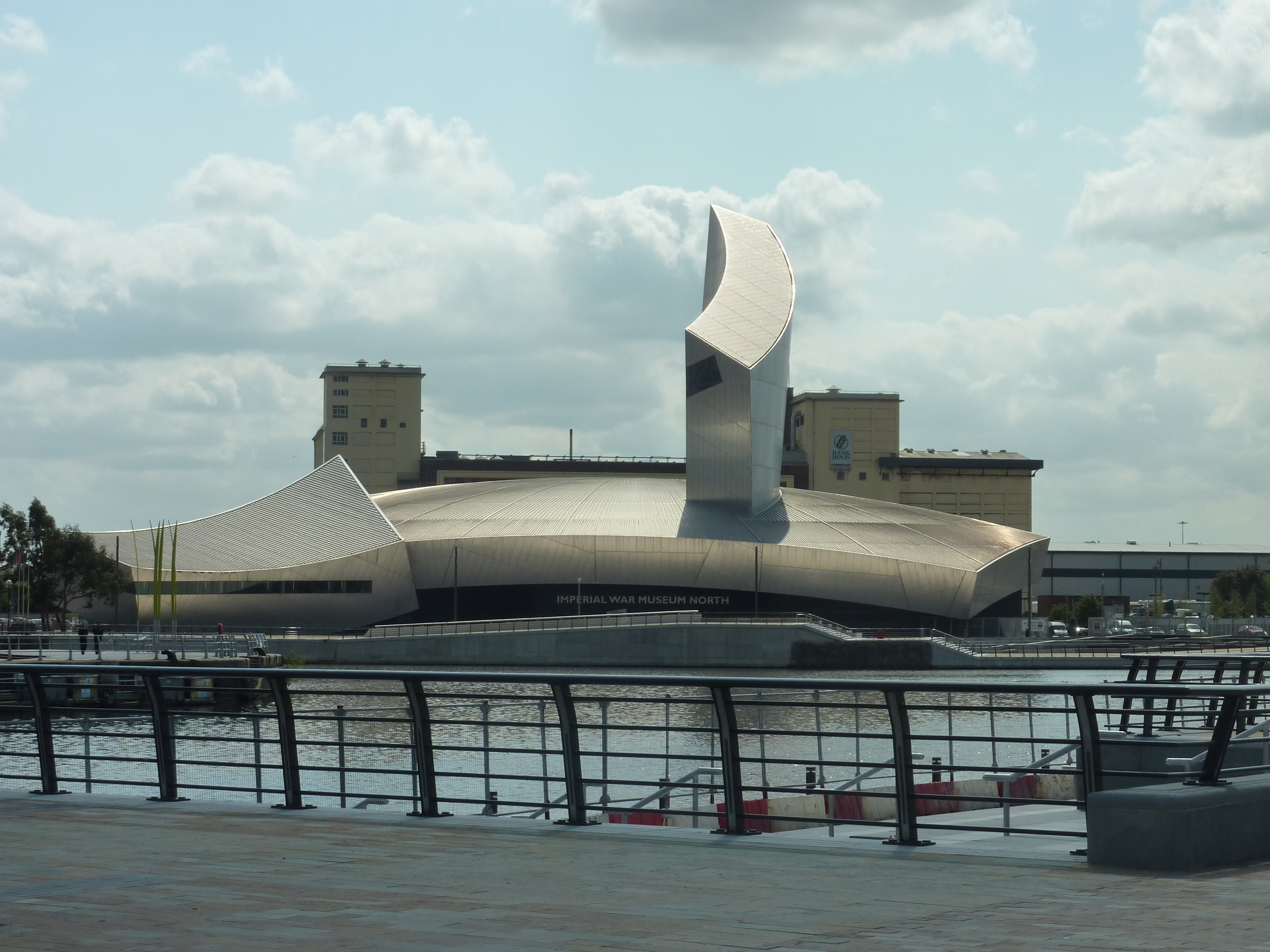
The Imperial War Museum North, opened 2001 and designed by Daniel Libeskind.

The museum has an extensive collection of historical artefacts, primarily from the wars occurring during the 20th century, the museum also has an exhibition house with theme changes on a regular basis. As of 2021, the exhibition is dedicated to aid workers throughout the world, predominantly the Middle East and North Africa. The museum also has a large section of twisted and rusted steelwork from the collapsed World Trade Center.

=== MediaCityUK ===
MediaCityUK is a 200 acres (81 ha) mixed-use property development on Pier 9 of the Quays with a focus on creative industries. It was developed by the Peel Group. Its principal tenants are media organisations including the BBC. The brownfield site occupied by the development was part of the Port of Manchester.

== Businesses ==
The Quayside Mall contains outlet stores of well-known high-street businesses, including Cadbury, Marks & Spencer and Gap. The mall contains coffee shops and convenience food chains, and a multi-screen cinema operated by Vue. Outside the mall, a bar and several restaurants overlook the Lowry plaza.

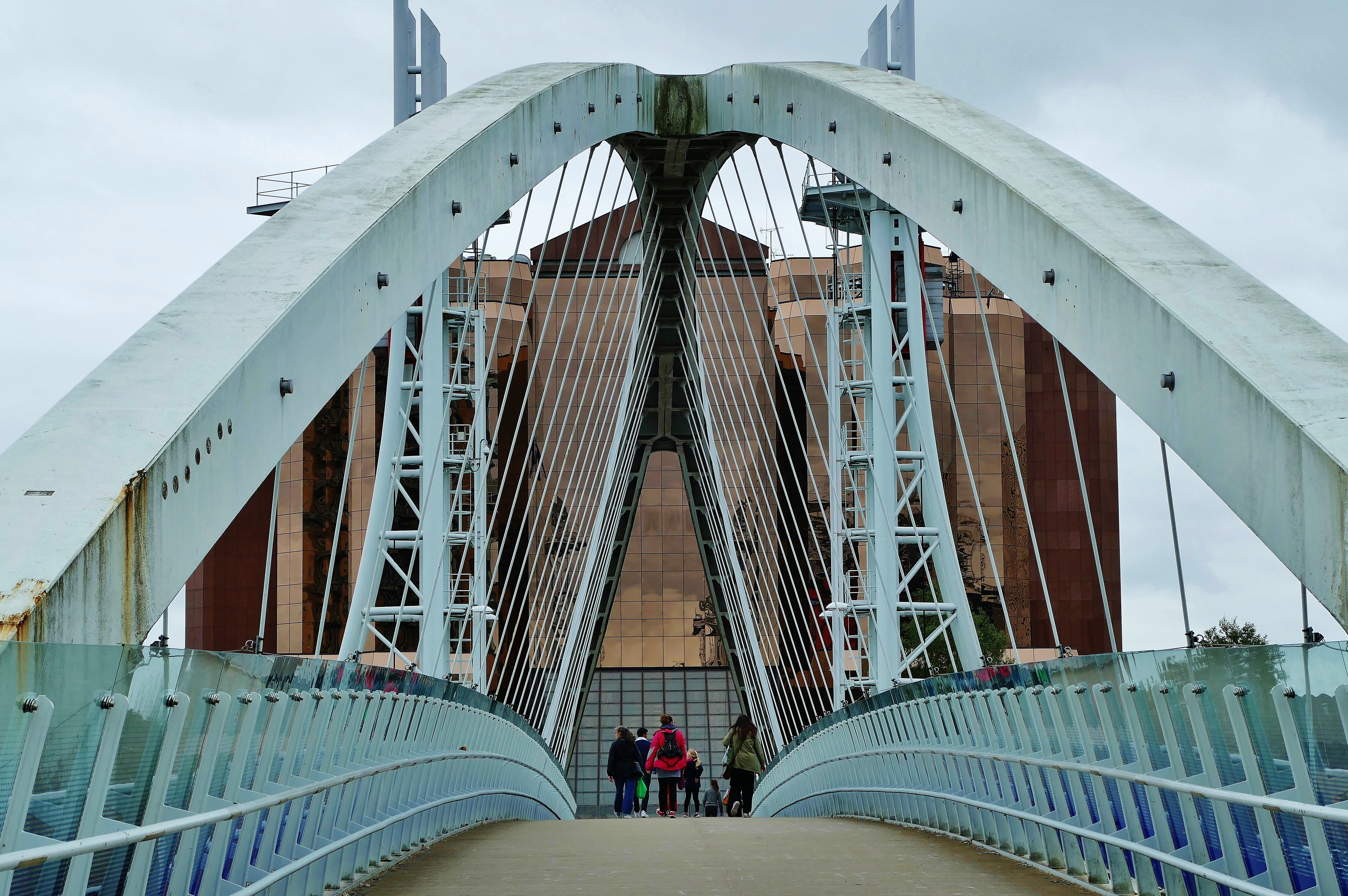
Ship Canal bridge and Office Block

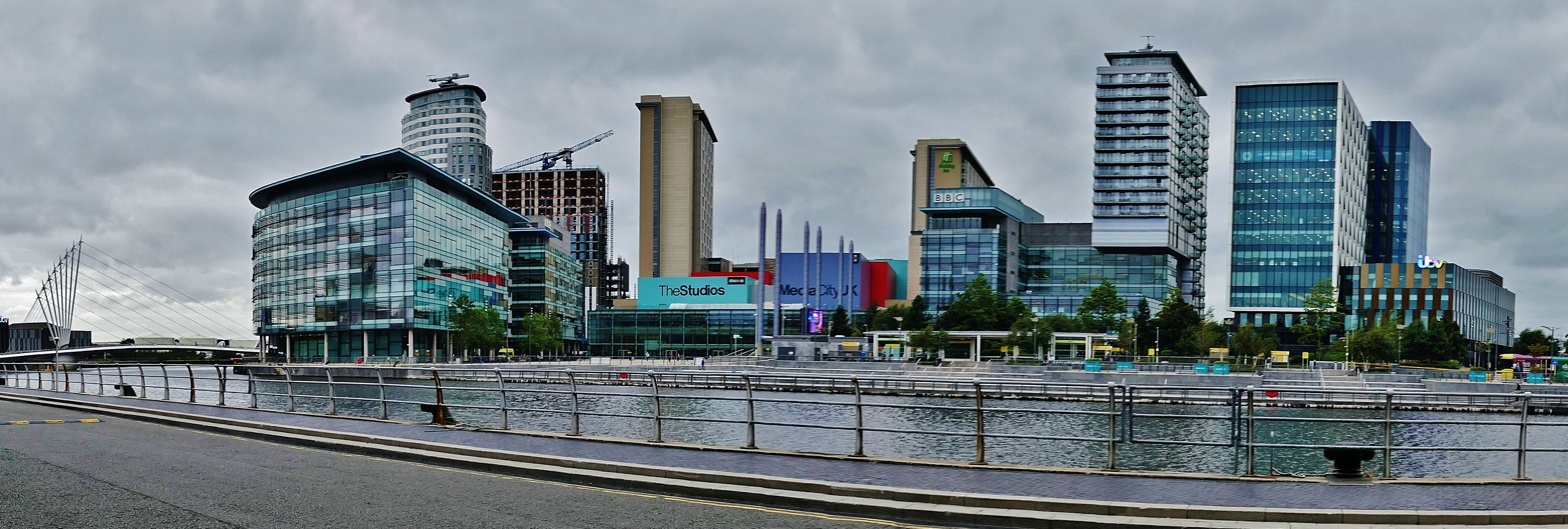
Media City offices - home to many TV companies

The head office of the UK arm of Communicorp is situated in Laser House on Salford Quays, with the company's flagship stations 100.4 Smooth Radio and XS Manchester broadcasting from studios there. Standing at the head of Erie Basin (Dock 9), Anchorage is a complex of buildings, which will shortly begin a partial redevelopment in to a residential complex alongside the existing office accommodation. To the north side of Erie Basin stand the Victoria and Alexandra buildings home to Haelo (Salford's Innovation and Improvement Science Centre).

To the south east known for its Exchange Quay tram stop, the former Palmolive factory has undergone a £25m renovation project known as Soapworks and is now the home of TalkTalk. The Soapworks is also a large base for civil servants outside London. The Home Office Operates a major regional Digital, Data and Technology (DDaT) Hub at Soapworks with Hundreds of staff.

Quays Reach has which is located between the Langworthy and MediaCityUK tram stops, houses numerous businesses such NSPCC and Datacentreplus. The Salford City College FutureSkills building is also situated on the same road.

== Residential ==
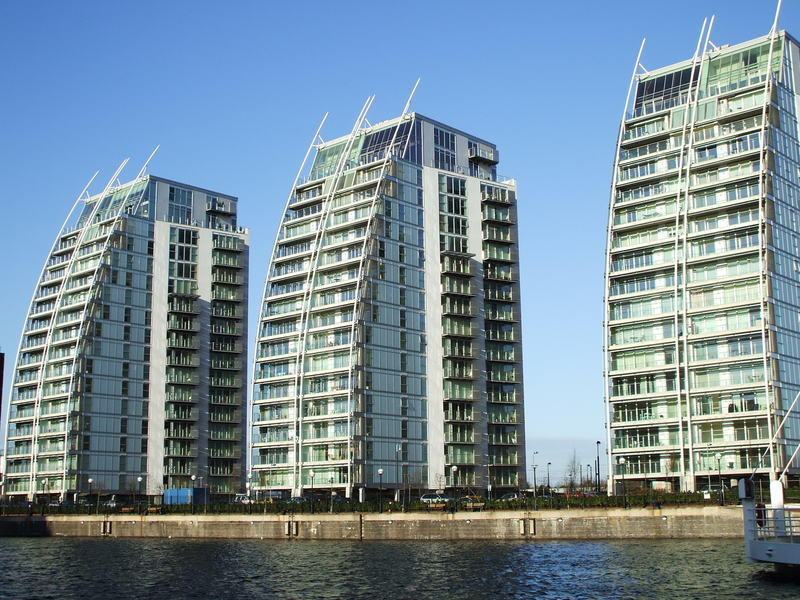
The NV Buildings

Some of the first developments in Salford Quays were residential, initial builds consisting of traditional low-rise flats and town houses in Grain Wharf and Merchants Quay. As the area prospered, more high-rise buildings were constructed to increase housing density on the limited pier space. Because of the premium on space, flats have been constructed on the opposite side of Trafford Road to the Quays.

=== Low rise ===
==== Merchants Quay ====
Merchants Quay was one of the area's earliest residential developments, constructed in the mid-to-late 1980s. It consists of 100 residential units including terraced houses, mews properties, and four low rise apartment blocks. It is situated on East Wharf South, between South Bay (Dock 6) to the south and the St Francis, St Louis, and St Peter basins (Dock 7) to the north. Properties on the western edge of the pier overlook the Imperial War Museum North and Lowry Bridge over the Quays turning circle; the largest expanse of water at Salford Quays. The development is linked to Pier 7, the business-orientated Waterfront Quay on the north side of the basins on East Wharf North. Many of the paths are derelict and have litter problems because neither the local councils (Salford, or Trafford on the opposite side of the water) nor the private owners or businesses accept responsibility for maintenance.

==== Grain Wharf ====
Located at the centre of the Quays, it consists of three matching developments: Winnipeg Quay and Vancouver Quay to the west of Mariners Canal, and St. Lawrence Quay to the east. Its name derives from the land's previous use, when imported grain was delivered by ship and transferred to the railway network that ran the length of Pier 8 (Central Wharf). Built between 1985 and 1995, Grain Wharf consists of a combination of two and three bedroom town houses and apartments, none exceeding four storeys in height. Many properties have views over Huron and Erie Basin (Dock 9) and Mariners Canal, with a number of town houses in Winnipeg and Vancouver Quay facing a landscaped garden square. The development is noted for its distinctly symmetrical layout. Mariners Canal was added to link the cleaned water of Ontario Basin to the south and Erie Basin to the north for water sports; the watersports centre is opposite Vancouver Quay. Vancouver and St. Lawrence Quays are linked by a footbridge over the canal, and by the Quays road.

==== Labrador Quay ====
These five three-storey apartment blocks at the far end of Erie Basin were completed in 2003. Accessed via the St. Lawrence Quay cul-de-sac, the buildings are inconspicuous due to the waterside tree planting and their location behind both The Lighthouse offices and Anchorage buildings. Two buildings face directly onto the water of Erie Basin, while the others are angled around communal gardens.

=== High rise ===
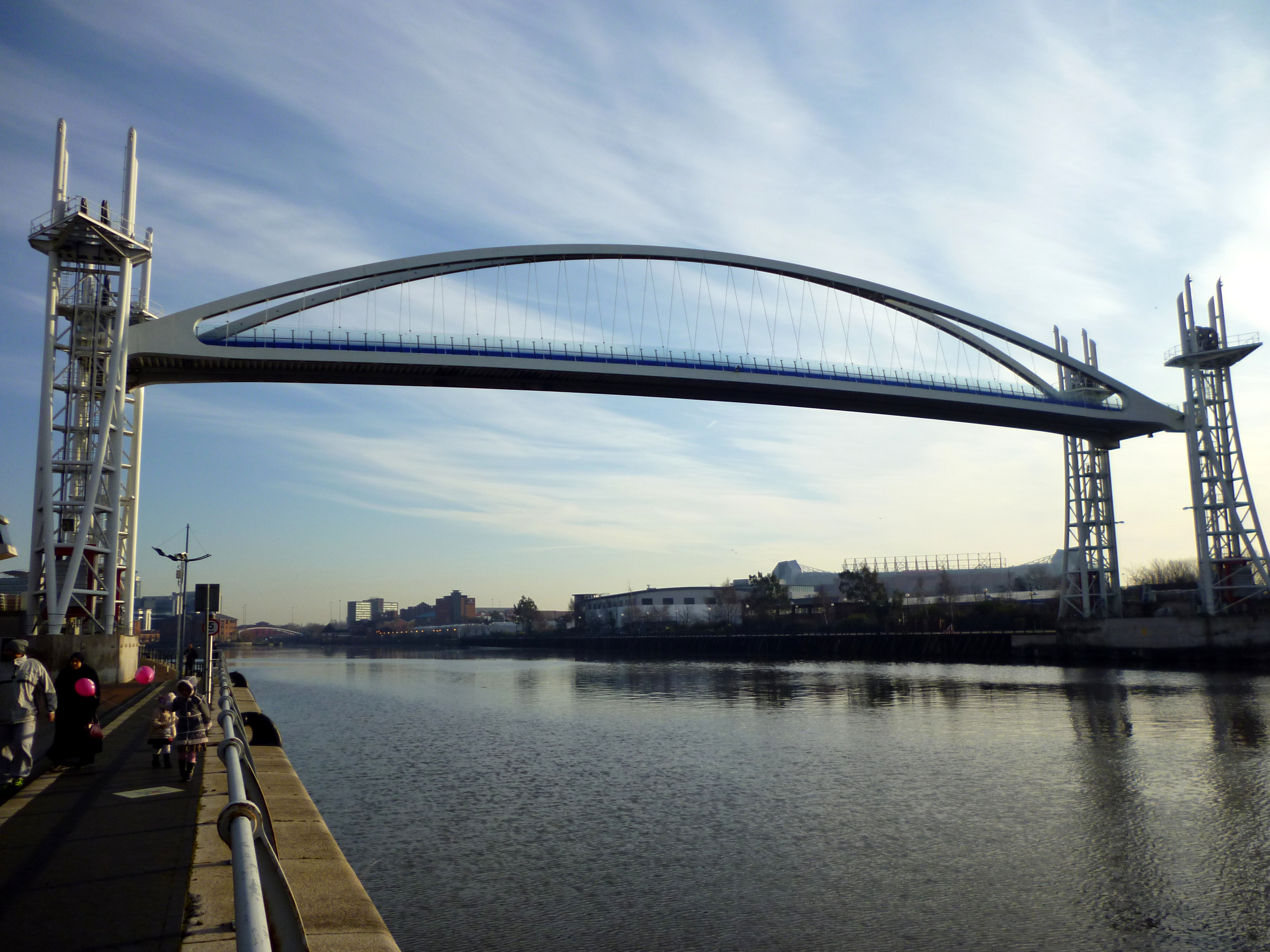
Millennium footbridge fully raised

==== Imperial Point ====
This was the first of the high-rise residential buildings on the Quays: a 16-storey tower built alongside the Quayside Mall on Pier 8 (Central Wharf) in 2001. Finished in sand-coloured cladding with grey and steel finishes to the roof, service cores and balconies, the lower levels are integrated into the mall.

==== Sovereign Point ====
This sister building of Imperial Point is located towards the rear of the Quayside Mall. Completed in 2005, its 20 storeys are residential, except for some commercial units at ground level, including Sovereign Food and Wine, the Quays' first grocery store. The tower's design was controversial and regarded as having a poor aesthetic on all but the water-facing elevation and is in stark relief to the neighbouring low-rise Winnipeg Quay.

==== The NV Buildings ====
Designed by Broadway Maylan and completed between 2004 and 2005, the development consists of three 18-storey residential towers, each 180 ft (55 m) in height. Costing £36 million, they stand in a line overlooking Huron Basin from the waterside of Pier 9 (North Wharf), their curved frontages are designed to represent sails. At night, the buildings are illuminated by green lights atop curved poles, and green flood light to either side. The Type 3 apartment in the NV Buildings won gold for "Best Apartment" in 2004 "What House?" awards.

==== City Lofts ====
Construction began in 2005 and completed in late 2007. The development consists of two linked towers: one 9 storeys, the other 19 storeys. They are on land adjacent to the bund carrying the Quays road, which separates the Manchester Ship Canal from the cleaned water of the Salford Quays basins. The apartments' interior design was by Conran & Partners. Interest in the development was limited, due to the slump in the housing market, and in July 2008, City Lofts was forced to place all its unsold apartments, including many at Salford Quays, into receivership.

==== MediaCityUK ====
Completed in 2010, The Heart and NumberOne are both 22-storey blocks.

==== X1 Media City ====
X1 Media City is the tallest development on the Quays. As of 2023, Towers A, B and D are completed, Tower C is yet to start construction. Once complete, the development will be the largest residential scheme in the north west, comprising 1,100 apartments.

== Leisure uses ==
=== Sport ===
In 2003, Salford Quays was the venue for the first International Triathlon Union World Cup event to be held in the UK. It has since become an annual event held at the end of July each year, although the 2008 event was cancelled because of a clash with the Beijing Olympics. In September 2010 and May 2011, the site hosted the Great Salford Swim, a mass participation open water swim event. The event has been re-branded as the Great Manchester Swim since 2012.

Salford Watersports Centre opened in 2001, in Ontario Basin, a closed off area created for it providing a range of watersports and outdoor activities including Royal Yachting Association recognised training in sailing and British Canoe Union recognised training in kayaking and canoeing. Agecroft Rowing Club currently operates from Salford Quays.

In 2012 the Salford Quays were rejuvenated for the London Olympic Games, in which they were used for swimming and diving. Six gold medallists swam at the Quays.

In 2013, the triathlon returned on 18 August.

In 2015, East Cheshire Sub Aqua Club installed a 2-metre x 3 metre scuba diving training platform in St Peter's basin further extending the use of the Salford Quays for watersports, allowing scuba divers to safely conduct training, away from the silt in the basin.

=== Tourism ===
Salford Quays is part of a joint tourism initiative between Salford and Trafford councils supported by private sector partners including the Lowry, the Imperial War Museum North, Manchester United F.C., Lancashire County Cricket Club, the Quayside Mall and the Golden Tulip and Copthorne Hotels; working in partnership with Marketing Manchester. Salford Quays forms one part of the area known as the Quays, which also includes Trafford Wharf and Old Trafford, on the Trafford side of the ship canal.

== Transport ==
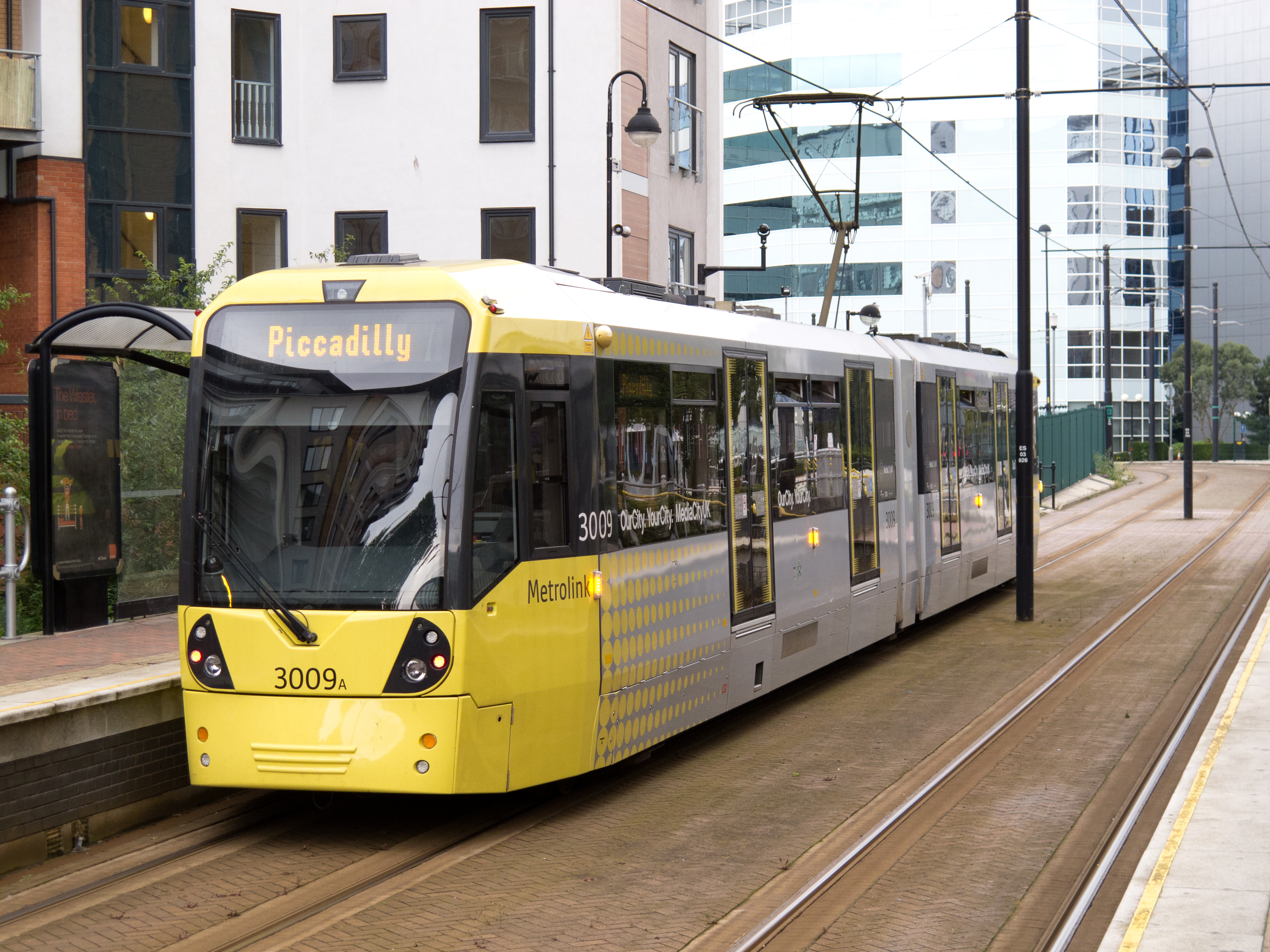
Manchester Metrolink tram bound for Piccadilly at Exchange Quay Metrolink Station.

Salford Quays is connected to Manchester city centre by the Eccles Line of the Manchester Metrolink. This connection opened in 1999 and was extended onward to Eccles in 2000. The section of the Eccles Line from Pomona to MediaCityUK serves the Salford Quays area. Trams operate every 6 minutes throughout the day (except MediaCityUK tram stop which is every 12 minutes) and every 15 minutes on Sundays. MediaCityUK Metrolink tram stop opened in summer 2010 to serve the MediaCityUK complex.

The Metrolink Trafford Park Line opened in March 2020. It includes two stations close to Salford Quays: Wharfside and Imperial War Museum.

Frequent bus services are provided from the Quays by Go North West's Orbits 53 providing links to Oxford Road, Etihad Campus, Salford Shopping Centre and Cheetham Hill and Stagecoach Manchester's 50 linking MediaCityUK to East Didsbury, Manchester Piccadilly bus station, Salford Central and Salford Crescent railway stations, the University of Salford and Salford Shopping Centre. A number of lower frequency routes are operated by Diamond Bus North West linking Boothstown, Worsley and Stretford with the area.

Salford Quays and the Trafford Wharf area are accessible from the M602 motorway and major arterial routes from the Trafford Centre, Manchester city centre, Salford and Old Trafford. Many main routes around the Quays are high-quality dual carriageway routes, built after the closure of Salford Docks.
