= One St Peter's Square =

High-rise office building in Manchester, England

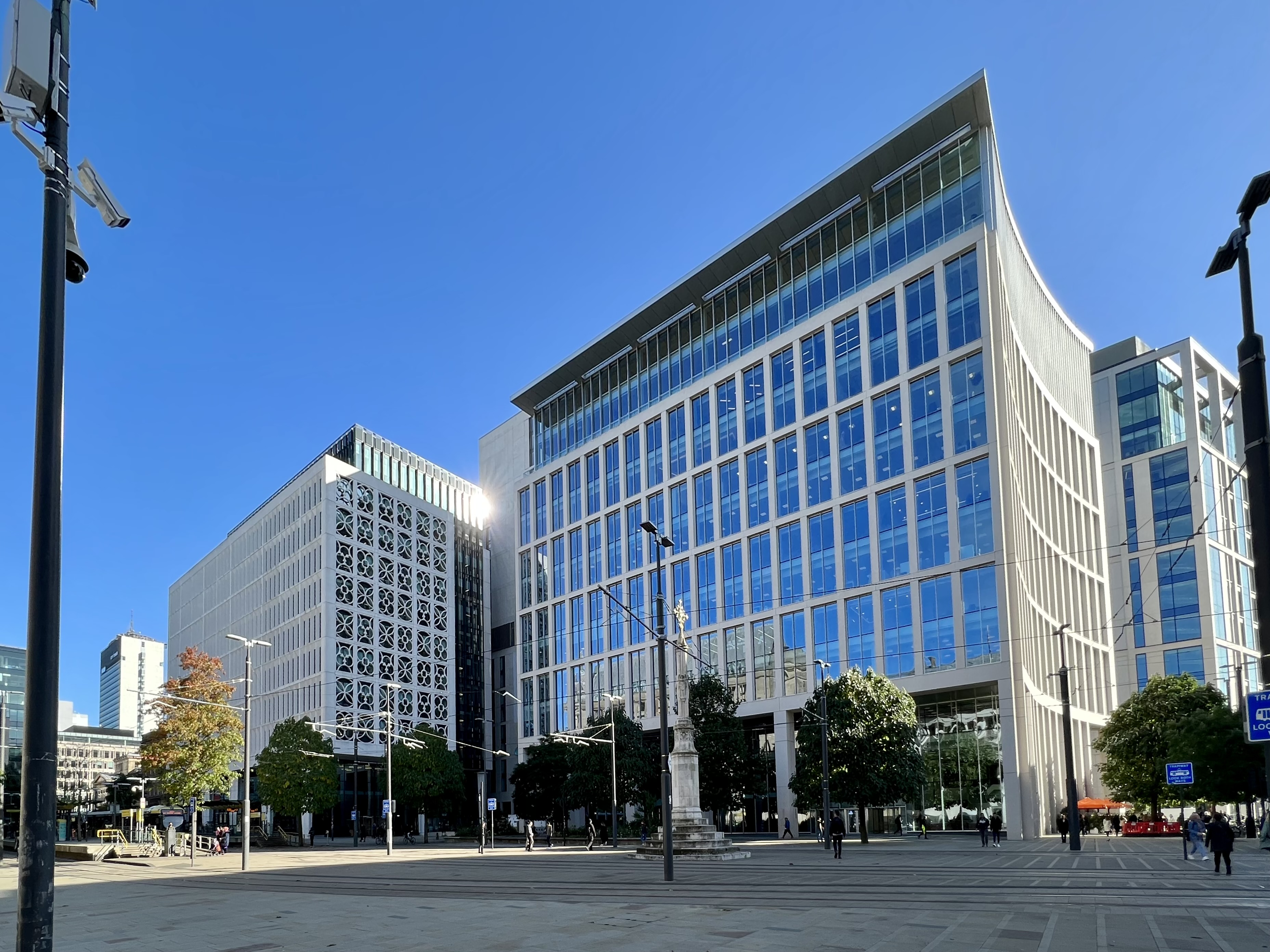
- One St Peter's Square from Peter Street

General information
- Status: Completed
- Type: High-rise office
- Architectural style: Modern classical
- Location: St Peter's Square, Manchester, England
- Coordinates: 53°28′39″N 2°14′35″W
- Construction started: May 2012
- Completed: September 2014
- Cost: £60 million
- Landlord: Savills

Height
- Height: 60 m (200 ft)

Technical details
- Floor count: 14
- Floor area: 268,000 sq ft (24,900 m^{2})

Design and construction
- Architect: Glenn Howells
- Main contractor: Carillion

Website
- onestpeterssquare.com

One St Peter's Square is a high-rise office building in Manchester, England. It is situated in St Peter's Square in the city centre.

== Elisabeth House ==
The previous building on the site was Elisabeth House, an office block constructed of concrete and built in 1960, and which had weathered badly. It was originally meant to be clad in stone to keep with its context but for financial reasons the exposed concrete was not clad. It used to house the Dutch Pancake House, which opened in the 1970s and closed in the early 2000s. Demolition of Elisabeth House began in late 2011 and the building was fully removed by April 2012.

== Office building ==
Construction of a new office building was first proposed in 2009, and was granted planning permission in 2010. The scheme was approved in July 2011, and a 25% pre-let of the building by professional services firm KPMG enabled construction to begin. One St Peter's Square consists of 268,000 sq ft (24,900 m^{2}) of Grade A office space.

In 2011, the Greater Manchester Property Venture Fund (GMPVF), part of the Greater Manchester Pension Fund, invested £10 million in the development.

Construction began in May 2012 and was due to be completed in early 2014 to coincide with completion of the Central Library and Town Hall redevelopment. It then underwent internal fit out and was completed in late 2014. Concern over the building's height surfaced during the construction of the core. One local observer said the building "is at least four storeys too tall on the site and the lift core alone makes the neighbours cower". The building fronts onto Midland Hotel, Central Library and the Town Hall Extension – all Grade II* listed buildings.

The columns supporting the building are on the outside, thus avoiding unwelcome columns in the office space. The exterior columns are clad in limestone rather than concrete. The choice of limestone was exacerbated by the need to remain in context with listed buildings in the vicinity and the desire to avoid weathering which is often seen in concrete. A three-storey glazed balcony tops the building and features a curved, overhanging roof complete with spotlights.

Situated in Manchester's historic district, the building needed to meet strict conservation area rules. One St Peter's Square was designed in a simple, modern classical style with high quality Jura limestone columns to fit in with the Central Library opposite. A sweeping top floor balcony perches out over St Peter's Square, providing a focal point for passers-by. The building forms part of the new civic space for St. Peter's Square. As part of the plans, the Central Library and Town Hall Extension were renovated (a process which began in 2010 and was completed in 2014) and the landscaping of the square with trees.

Three further high-rise blocks were built adjacent to One St Peter's Square: a 12-storey office building known as Two St Peter's Square, a 14-storey office building named Landmark on the site of the former Odeon Cinema, and 3 St Peter's Square, a 20-storey building which comprises a Motel One and Staycity aparthotel.

== Occupancy ==
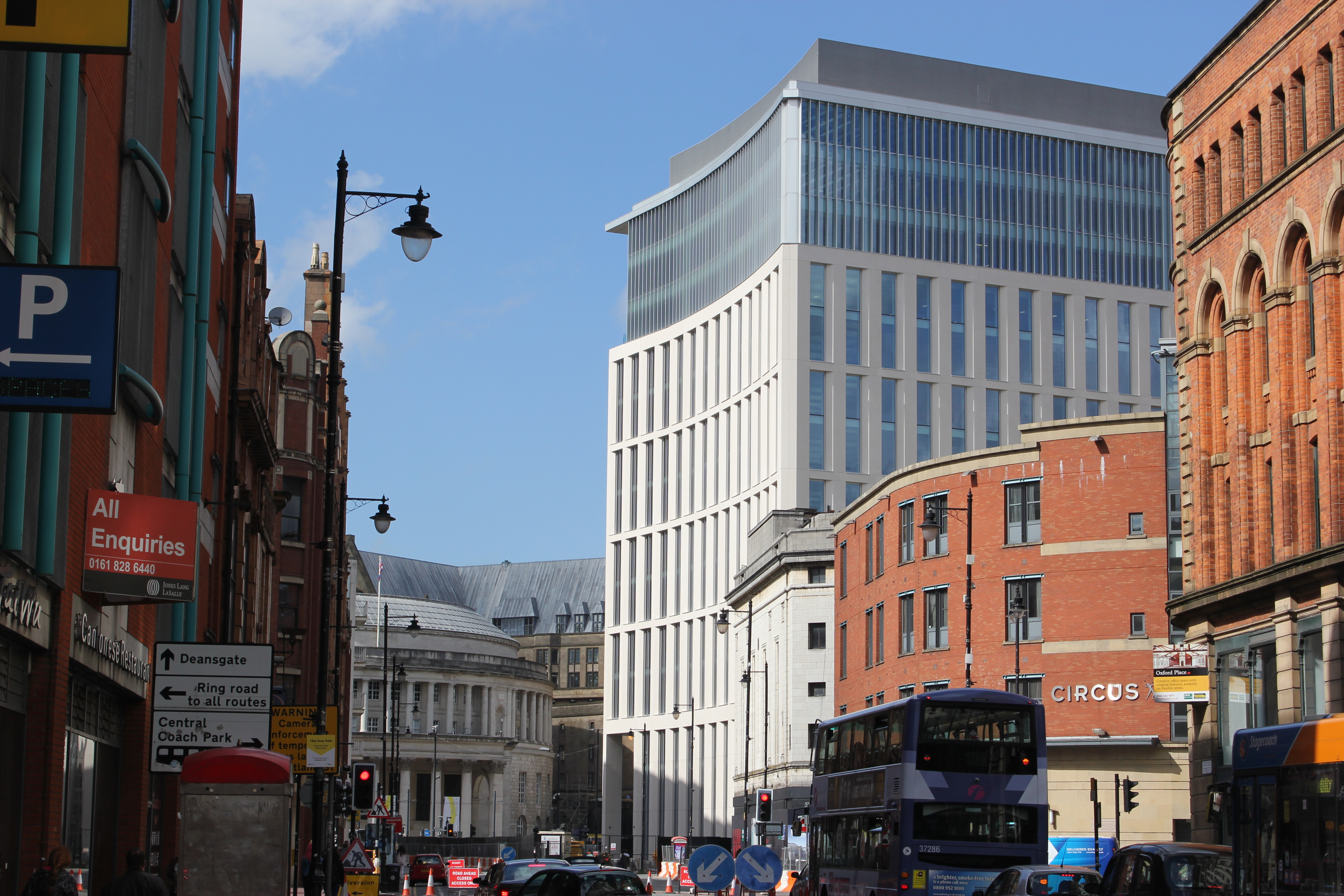
One St Peter's Square from Oxford Street, August 2014

In May 2014, it was reported that the restaurant chain San Carlo is set to open its fifth Manchester venue, launching a 5,500 sq ft (510 m^{2}) restaurant in One St Peter's Square in late October-early November 2014.

KPMG confirmed in July 2014 that it was taking an additional 10,500 sq ft (980 m^{2}) of office space across half of the 10th floor. They had initially agreed to take 63,000 sq ft (5,900 m^{2}) across the upper three floors. In December 2014, law firm DLA Piper agreed a 15-year lease for 45,000 sq ft of space on floors eight and nine.

As of February 2023, the building is occupied by KPMG, DLA Piper, Addleshaw Goddard, Irwin Mitchell, WeWork, Forvis Mazars and CBRE.
