= Wilmslow Road =

Major road in Manchester, England

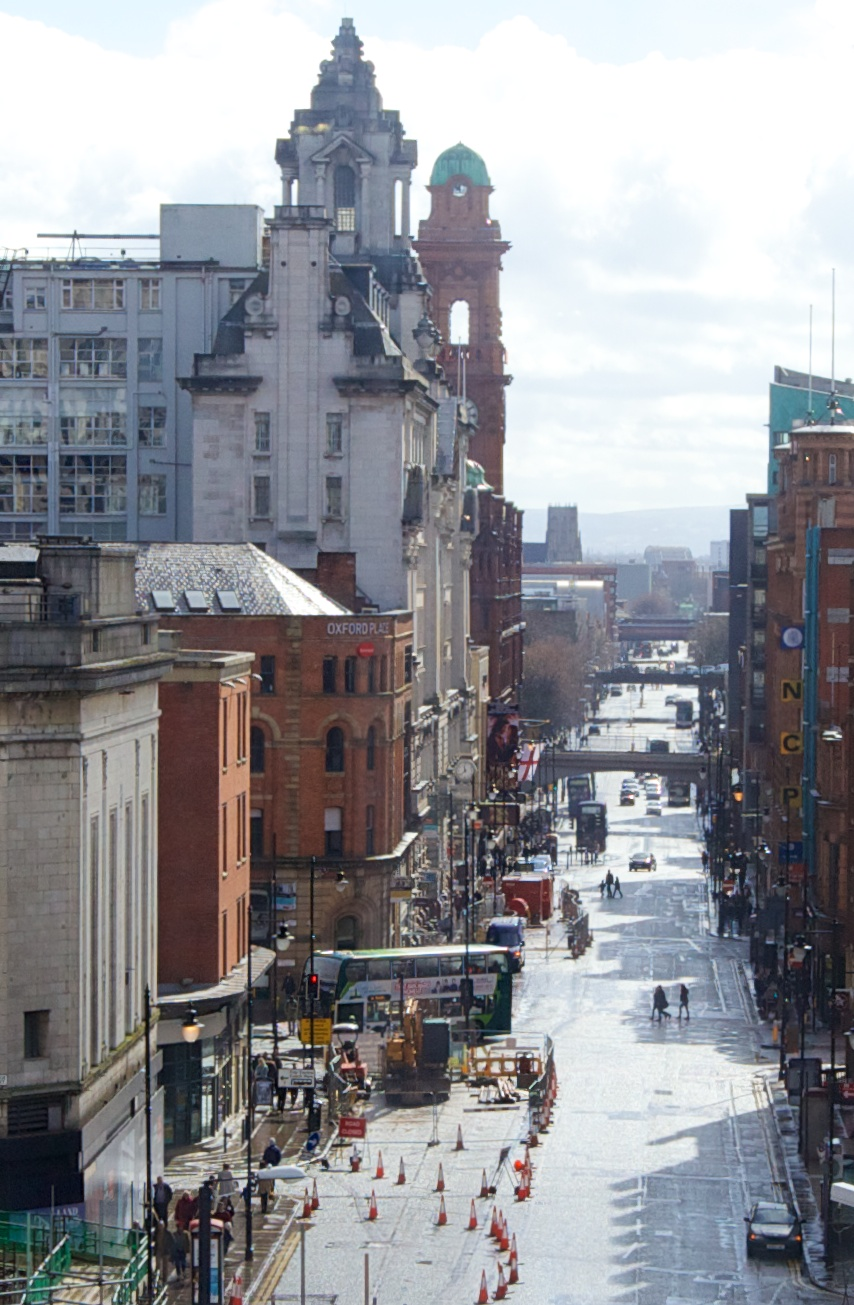
Oxford Street (foreground) and Oxford Road (in the distance)

Wilmslow Road is a major road in Manchester, England, running from Parrs Wood northwards to Rusholme where it becomes Oxford Road. The name of the road changes again to Oxford Street when it crosses the River Medlock before reaching Manchester city centre.

The road runs through the centres of Didsbury, Withington and Fallowfield, including the major student residential campus of Owens Park and Rusholme. Oxford Road passes through the University of Manchester campus, the Institute for Contemporary Theatre campus of BIMM University and the All Saints campus of the Manchester Metropolitan University. Several hospitals including the Christie Hospital and Manchester Royal Infirmary have been built along the road. It also features several parks and gardens such as Fletcher Moss Gardens, Platt Fields and Whitworth Park.

The road is part of a major bus corridor with bus movements of over one a minute at peak times and is a key centre for business, culture and higher education.

== Route ==
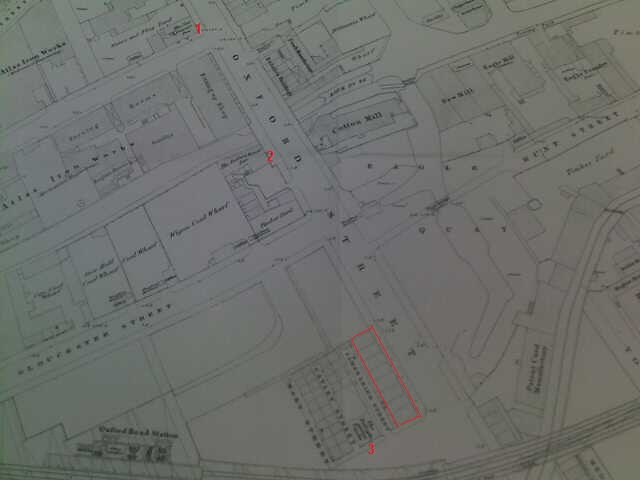
1849 Map of Oxford Street (Whitworth Street was built 50 years later replacing Bond Street and Whitworth Street West follows the line of Gloucester Street.)

Wilmslow Road, Oxford Road and Oxford Street are part of an 18th-century route from Manchester to Oxford, and from there to Southampton, which can be traced on modern maps by locating roads which are called (or used to be called) the A34. Wilmslow Road was designated the A34 until 1967. Many sections of the route have been re-designated when motorways and bypasses took the A34 away from its original route and they took names such as the A3400 and A44. The ancient route goes via Cheadle, Wilmslow, Congleton, Newcastle-under-Lyme, Stafford, Birmingham, Stratford-upon-Avon and Woodstock.

=== Boundaries and designations ===
Oxford Road and Oxford Street are the continuation of Wilmslow Road into the centre of Manchester. Oxford Street begins at St Peter's Square 53°28′40″N 2°14′39″W and the name changes from Oxford Street to Oxford Road as the road crosses the River Medlock 53°28′25″N 2°14′24″W, placing Oxford Road railway station closer to Oxford Street than Oxford Road. Wilmslow Road starts at the junction with Hathersage Road 53°27′33″N 2°13′39″W and continues to Parrs Wood 53°24′21″N 2°13′06″W where it crosses the ancient county boundary into Cheshire. It crosses the River Mersey over the Cheadle Bridge into Cheadle. Its route is then called Manchester Road for a short time but there is a Wilmslow Road on the other side of Cheadle.

Oxford Street and a section of Oxford Road together form part of the A34. The B5117 consists of part of Oxford Road and part of Wilmslow Road. Though a continuous thoroughfare, part of Wilmslow Road also contains part of the A6010, the whole of the B5093, part of the A5145 and the whole of the B5095.

== History ==
=== Turnpike trust ===
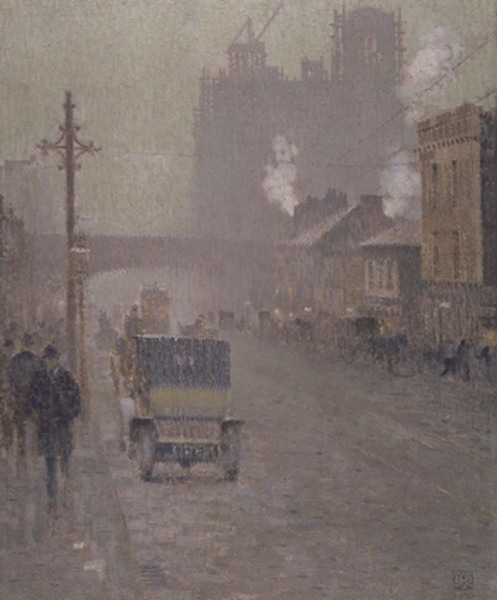
Oxford Road, Manchester. A 1910 oil painting of a foggy Oxford Road by Adolphe Valette. Construction of the Refuge Assurance Building can be seen in the background and the bridge remains the same.

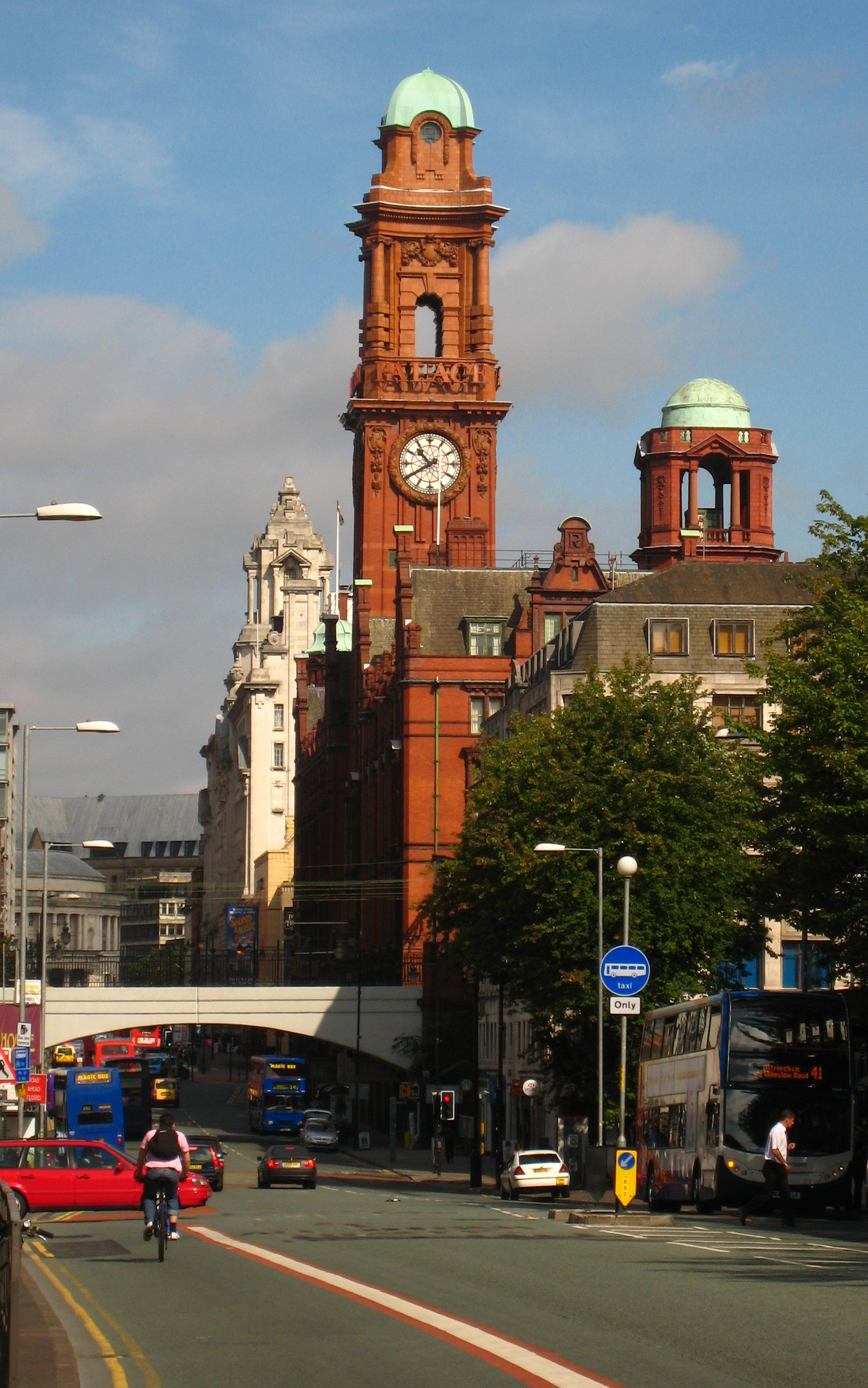
Oxford Road, a century later in 2010

In 1753, the Manchester and Wilmslow Turnpike Trust was created by Act of Parliament, with powers to build, maintain, and improve the most northerly stretch of the Manchester to Oxford route, funded by the collection of tolls. In 1755 the trust built the first stone bridge over the Mersey. This collapsed in 1756 and was rebuilt in 1758. The bridge was replaced in 1780 and again in 1861.

The improved transport links spurred the development of villages such as Rusholme and Withington along the route. These villages eventually merged and became part of the city of Manchester. Chorlton-on-Medlock, the district nearest the town centre, was developed as a residential suburb in 1793–1794 by the three landowners. Most of the important streets were given impressive names, Oxford Street, Cambridge Street and Grosvenor Street being three of these. Over the next fifty years residential development spread southwards as far as High Street (the old name of Hathersage Road). The very few remaining dwellings of that period include Waterloo Place, 323, 325, 327 and 333 Oxford Road and Grove House (316–324).

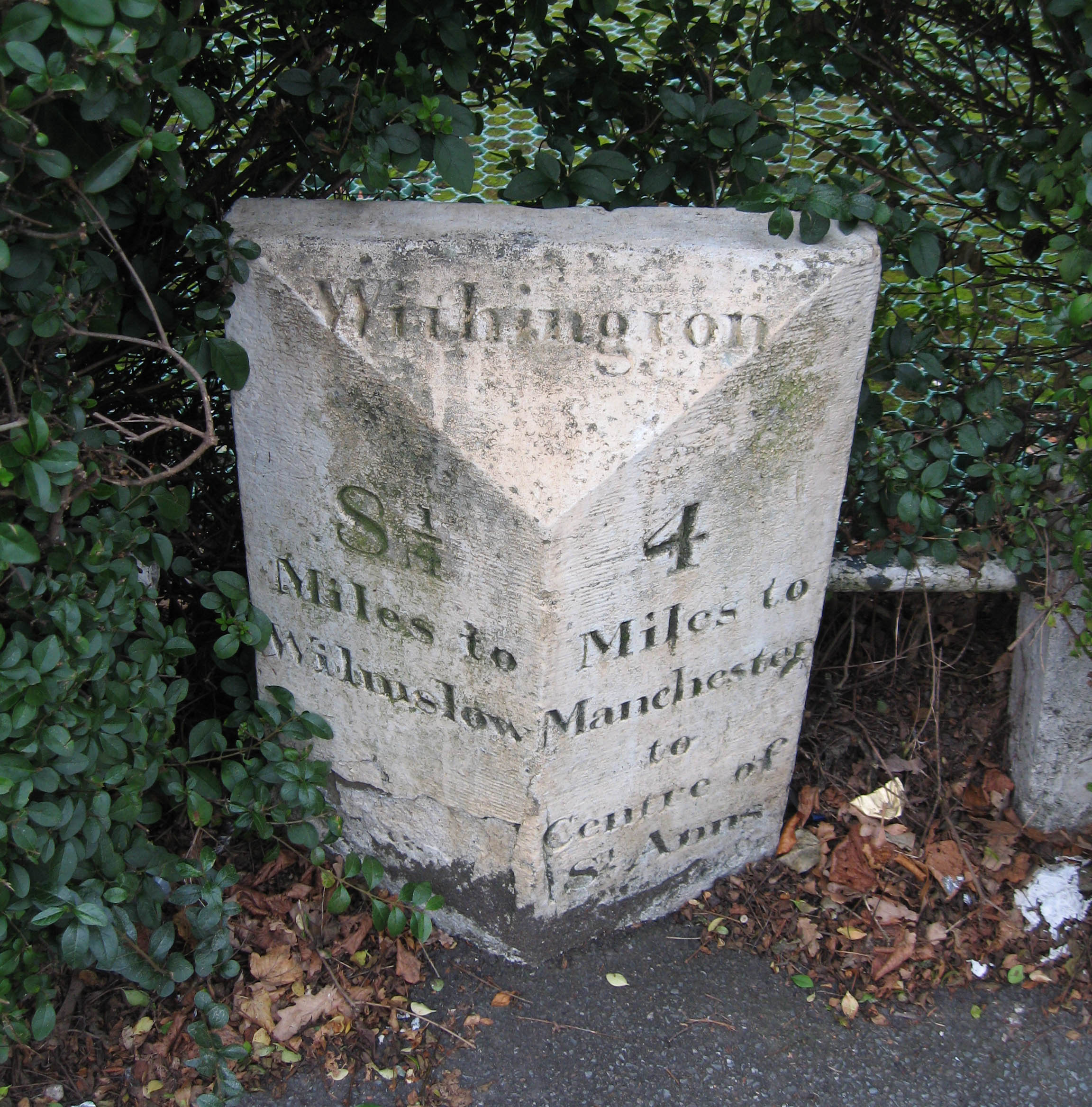
A milestone in Withington which was placed by the Manchester Turnpike Trust. It stands opposite a public house named The Turnpike.

In 1861 the turnpike trust was threatened with abolition but survived by offering to build Palatine Road from Withington to West Didsbury. All turnpike trusts in the United Kingdom were abolished by 1881. Until some time in the 1880s all of Oxford Road and Oxford Street was called Oxford Street (as far south as High Street). The present street and road with different series of house numbers were introduced so that Oxford Street ended at the old township border of the River Medlock. The Chorlton-on-Medlock section became Oxford Road and from Rusholme to Parrs Wood remained Wilmslow Road.

=== Trams ===
Horse-drawn omnibuses operated along Wilmslow Road from before 1850. In 1877 the Rusholme Board of Health gained Parliamentary approval to lay tramlines. The trams were horse drawn and operated by the Manchester Carriage Company. Rusholme was incorporated into the City of Manchester in 1885. The city electrified the route in December 1902 and operated the new trams. The Tram Sheds, a feature of Wilmslow Road at the time were no longer needed and became a riding school and later the Rusholme Theatre.

=== Congestion ===
Kingsway was constructed in stages, from 1928, and completed in 1930. It was built as relief road to ease congestion on Wilmslow Road to the west. It was named after King George V and was originally numbered A5079. It was one of the earliest purpose-built roads especially for motor vehicles, and built as a dual carriageway. In 1959, it was extended south across the River Mersey to bypass Cheadle and later renumbered to become the A34 in 1967.

=== Bus corridor ===
Wilmslow Road is reputed to be the busiest bus corridor in Europe. The Bee Network have operated all services on the corridor since 2025 under a franchising scheme. For some years after bus deregulation in 1986 it had been common for four or five different operators to run services along the length of the route at any one time, but Stagecoach Manchester had become dominant by 2017, and retained that status until the introduction of franchising.

The bus corridor is popular with passengers for its frequent bus services, relatively low fares, and services that run at any hour of the day. Other factors responsible for the high patronage include the high density of students and the notable public facilities that can be found along the route. Wilmslow Road is designated a Quality Bus Corridor by Transport for Greater Manchester.

=== Oxford Road Corridor ===
The Oxford Road Corridor innovation district is a square mile in the south of Manchester's city centre where two of the UK's largest universities, the University of Manchester and Manchester Metropolitan University, are based alongside Manchester University NHS Foundation Trust. These organisations oversee the area in a partnership incorporated in 2007 alongside Manchester City Council and Bruntwood.

In 2015, The Department for Business, Energy and Industrial Strategy (BEIS) invited consortia, formed around geographic and technological themes, to apply to be involved in the science and innovation audit (SIA) process. The Greater Manchester and East Cheshire SIA highlighted that 50% of the City Region's science and innovation assets were located in the Oxford Road Corridor. Recognising the region's 'Core Strengths' in Health Innovation and Advanced Materials, and 'Fast Growth Opportunities' focused on the future potential of Digital, Energy, and Industrial Biotechnology.

In 2018, Manchester City Council adopted a Strategic Spatial Framework for the Oxford Road Corridor to guide future development and protect the area's unique innovation eco-system.

The Oxford Road Corridor is home to a wide concentration of public, private, academic, and clinical institutions, generating 20% of Manchester's GVA and providing 79,000 jobs. It is home to 50% of Manchester's life sciences businesses, 74,000 students including 16,220 international students, with 42% of all students studying STEM related disciplines. Property companies Bruntwood and Bruntwood SciTech have invested significantly into assets in the area, acquiring the Manchester Technology Centre in 2003 and developing Manchester Science Park and Citylabs, both of which have designated Life Sciences Enterprise Zone status, and Circle Square which is home to over 35 digital tech businesses including Hewlett Packard Enterprise, Northcoders, Blair Project and Tootoot.

The Oxford Road Corridor partnership shapes the direction of Oxford Road, using cultural activity to animate the area such as 2021's Corridor of Light.

== Landmarks ==
Sorted from north to south, although there is some overlap.

=== Oxford Street ===
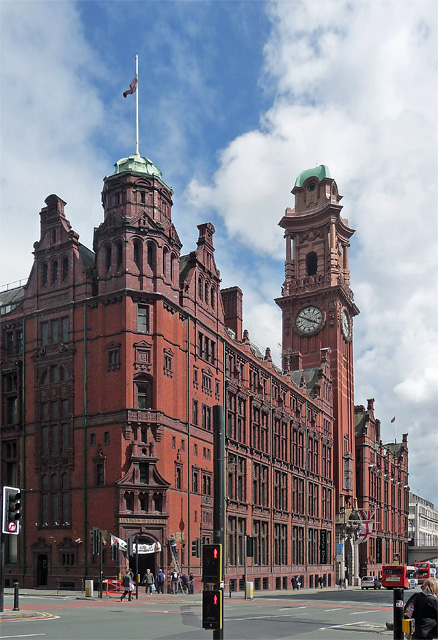
Refuge Assurance Building (Kimpton Clocktower Hotel)

- One St Peter's Square, a 14 storey office building on the junction of Oxford Street and Mosley Street adjacent to St Peter's Square which was completed in 2014. Previously Elisabeth House, which was demolished in 2012.
- Odeon Cinema (demolished), originally the Paramount, opened on 6 October 1930, in its later period converted to a multi-screen cinema. It once had a fine theatre organ, and was where comedy duo Morecambe and Wise first met. The cinema closed in 2004, and it was believed the interior was deliberately destroyed to avoid listing of the building which would create difficulty if the owners wanted to demolish the building. In 2012, the building remained empty and derelict. In 2017 it was demolished to provide space for the Landmark office development.
- St James's Buildings, at no. 65 (Grade II listed), contain offices for various companies with shops and other facilities at street level. This building was designed by architects Clegg, Fryer & Penman for the Calico Printers' Association and built in 1912–13. It is high and broad and the façade is all of Portland stone. The central entrance block is crowned by a tower; the entrance hall is the most opulent in surviving Manchester warehouses. It has green marble columns and the walls are clad with grey and white marble.
- Tootal, Broadhurst and Lee Building, Manchester (formerly Churchgate House) at no. 56 (Grade II*). Originally built as a cotton warehouse.
- Palace Theatre, on the junction of Whitworth Street. One of the premiere theatres in the United Kingdom outside of the West End.
- Manchester Oxford Road railway station (Grade II): although named Oxford Road, the railway station is located on Whitworth Street West which begins at 68 Oxford Street; access to the station is by Station Approach.
- Bridgewater Heights (also known as 17 New Wakefield Street) is a 348 ft (106 m) tall building on Great Marlborough Street south of the railway line (because of its height, it overlooks Oxford Street).
- Artisan Heights (also known as 1-5 Wakefield Street) is a 312 ft (95 m) tall student accommodation tower.
- Red brick and terracotta Refuge Assurance Building (Grade II*) has a 217-foot (66 m) tower and now houses the Kimpton Clocktower Hotel.

=== Oxford Road ===
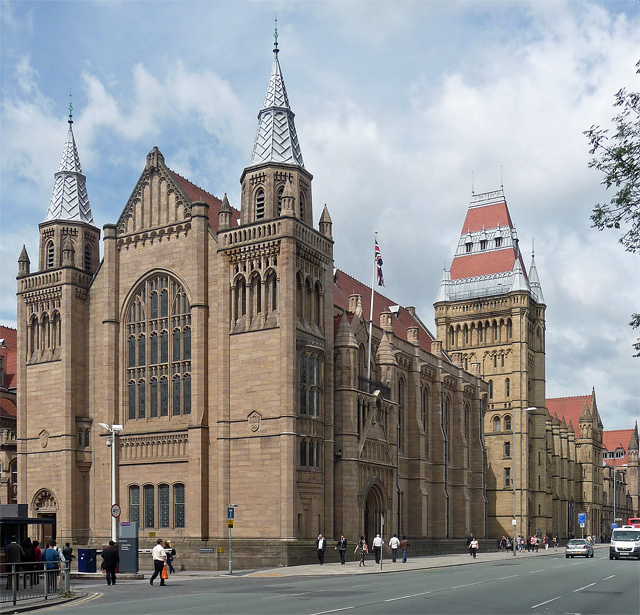
Whitworth Hall, ceremonial hall of the University of Manchester

- New Broadcasting House (now demolished) was the regional headquarters of the BBC North West from 1975 until 2012. The BBC has moved down the River Irwell from the city centre to MediaCityUK.
- All Saints Campus of Manchester Metropolitan University, the fourth largest university in the United Kingdom.
  - The Union MMU, the students' union for Manchester Metropolitan University at 99 Oxford Road (previously the site of the Northern School of Music). The students' union moved to Cambridge Street in January 2015.
- Royal Northern College of Music has 696 students and is at 124 Oxford Road with an entrance on Booth Street West.
- Manchester Aquatics Centre, a host venue of the 2002 Commonwealth Games, now owned by the University of Manchester.
- The University of Manchester is the largest "single-site" university in the United Kingdom with over 40,000 students. It includes the neogothic Manchester Museum. Its Oxford Road campus extends on both sides of Oxford Road south of Booth Street and north of Grafton Street and Denmark Road.
- Manchester Royal Infirmary is the chief site for Central Manchester and Manchester Children's University Hospitals NHS Trust.
- Whitworth Art Gallery is north of Whitworth Park.

=== Wilmslow Road ===
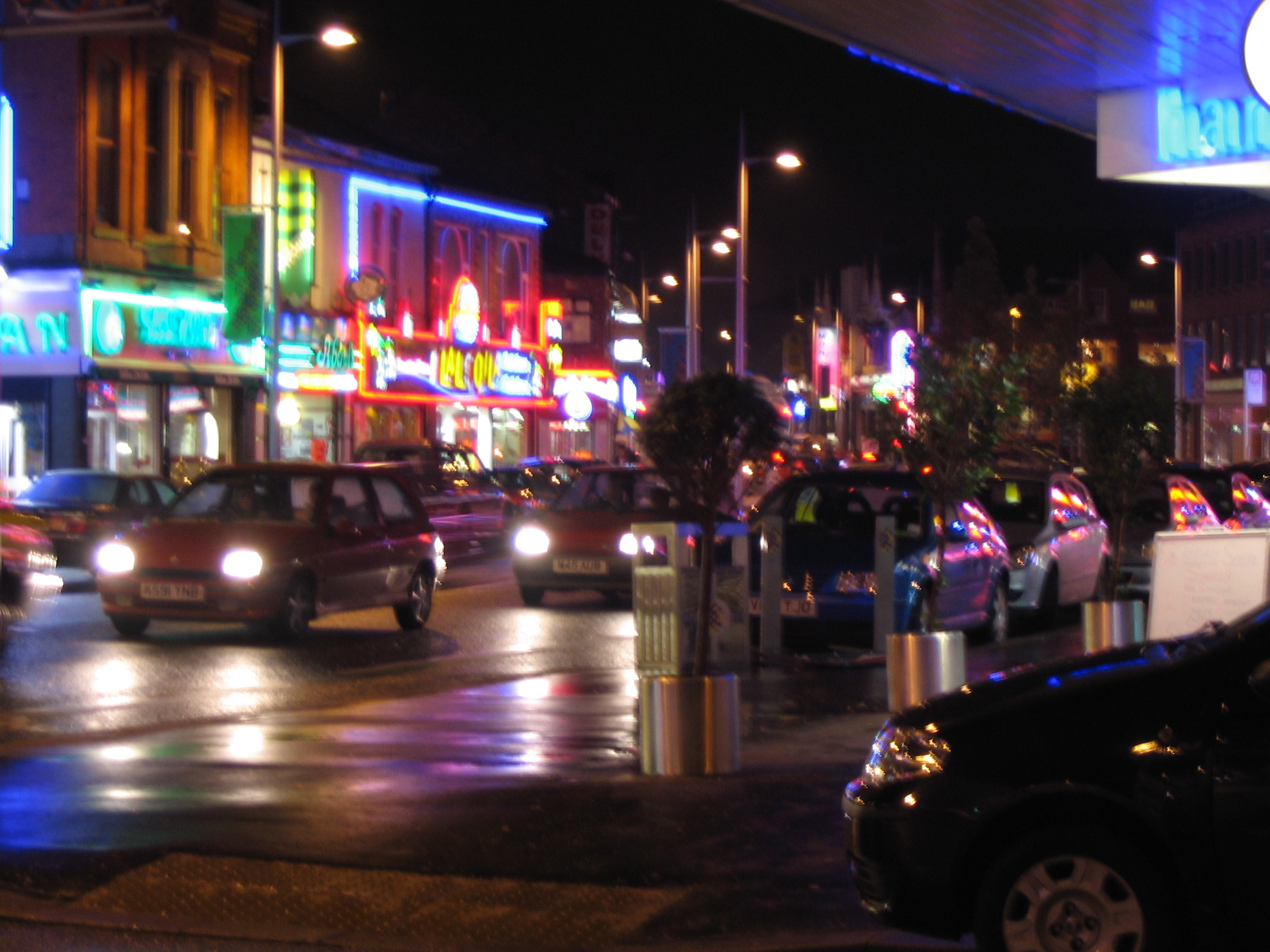
Wilmslow Road in Rusholme (the Curry Mile)

- Curry Mile is the stretch of Wilmslow Road in central Rusholme: it boasts at least 50 restaurants, take-aways and kebab houses specialising in the cuisines of South Asia and the Middle East.
- Fallowfield Campus is the main residential campus of the University of Manchester; Ashburne Hall is one of the halls on Wilmslow Road.
  - Owens Park is a large former hall of residence that housed 1,056 students.
- Withington Public Library
- Christie Hospital is one of the largest cancer treatment centres in Europe.
- Didsbury Campus, formerly part of Manchester Metropolitan University, now residential properties.
- Fletcher Moss Gardens
- Parrs Wood High School is the fourth largest secondary school in the UK with 2,480 pupils.
- The Towers is a research establishment.
- Appleby Lodge is a set of eight 1930s blocks of flats.

== Theatres and cinemas ==
Prince's Theatre was a theatre in Oxford Street from 1864 to 1940. It was built on a site on the corner of Lower Mosley Street by the architect Edward Salomons for the theatrical manager Charles Alexander Calvert. The theatre was the scene of a series of public-spirited dramatic enterprises, including those remarkable Shakespearean revivals organised successively by John Knowles and Charles Calvert. Later it became known for its pantomimes, from the mid-1890s until 1914. By the 1930s, it was in some financial difficulty and closed in 1940. After demolition and many years of delay the office block of Peter House was built on the site.

The Palace Theatre on the junction of Whitworth Street opened in 1891.

The Hippodrome, designed by Frank Matcham for Sir Oswald Stoll, was a 3,000-seat theatre built on the corner of Great Bridgewater Street, on part of the site of Hengler's Grand Cirque, and opened in December 1904. In 1934, it started showing films but the theatre was sold to Granada Theatres and closed in February 1935. The Hippodrome was demolished and replaced in October 1935 by the Theodore Komisarjevsky-designed 2,300-seat Gaumont, who acquired it from Granada shortly before opening. It was the grandest of Manchester's cinemas with a fine theatre organ. Norman Cocker was a notable organist there. After its eventual closure in January 1974 it was converted into Rotters nightclub and operated under several names until its closure in 1990. It was demolished and replaced by a NCP car park.

Other cinemas which have existed in Oxford Street, Oxford Road or Wilmslow Road are:

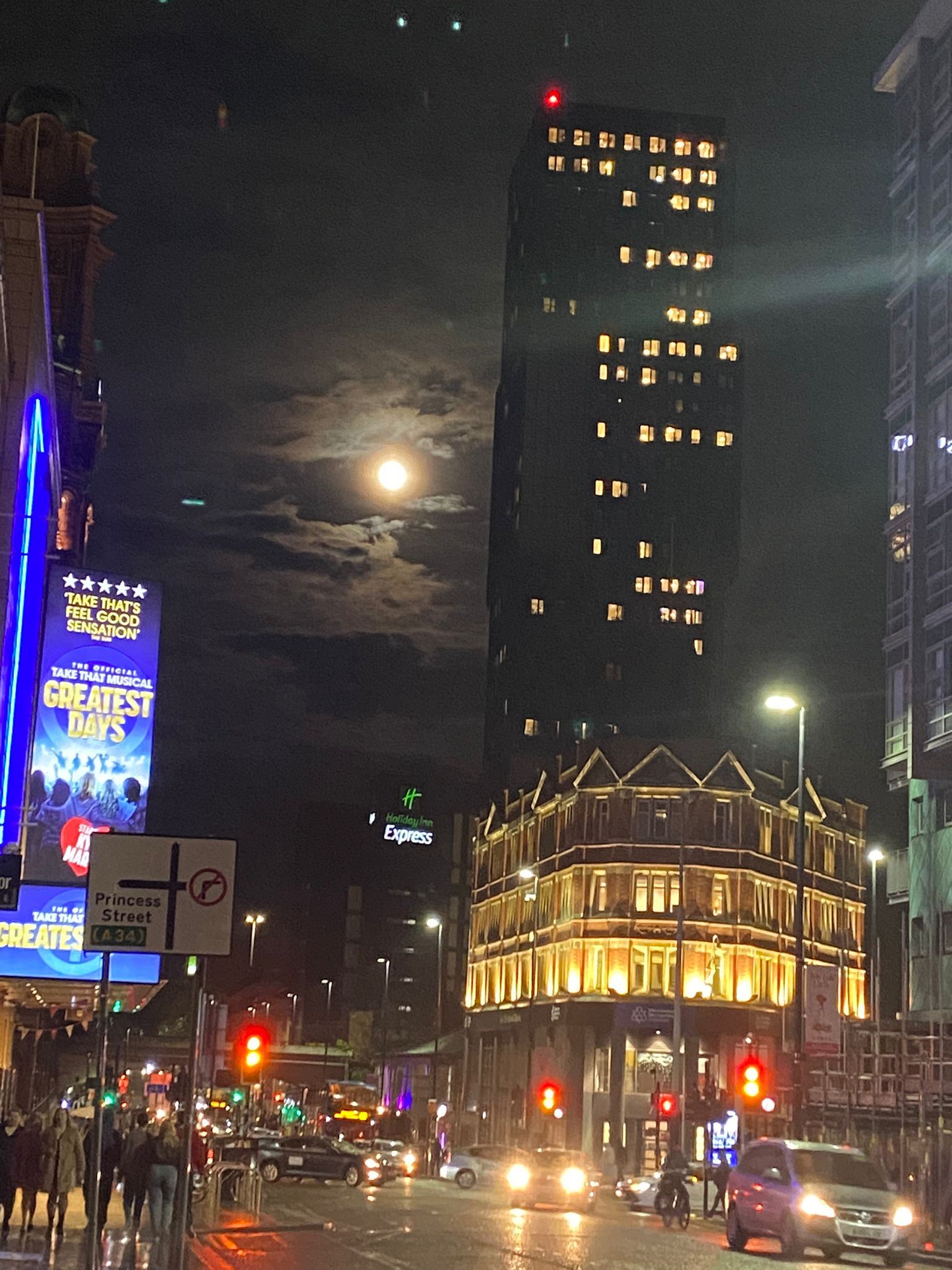
The moon over Cornerhouse

- Cornerhouse at no. 70, either side of Station Approach; Cornerhouse 1 was opened as the Tatler News Theatre in May 1935 designed by Peter Cummings. It closed in September 1959 and reopened as the Tatler Classic in November 1961. It was renamed the Tatler Cinema Club in 1969 and closed in August 1981 before the establishment of Cornerhouse with three cinemas in 1985. The Cornerhouse closed in 2015.
- Grosvenor Picture Palace was on the corner of Oxford Road and Grosvenor Street from 1915 to 1968 and is now the Footage pub.
- Manchester News Theatre on the corner of Hall Street was also designed by Peter Cummings and opened in December 1936. It became known as the Tatler Theatre until it closed in September 1967. It reopened as the Manchester Film Theatre from October 1967 to April 1973. It reopened again in August 1973 and later became the Cameo Cinema until it was demolished in 1981.
- New Oxford Cinema built by Provincial Cinematograph Theatres on the corner of Chepstow Street, next to the Hippodrome, opened in 1911. The opening programme on 15 December 1911 included footage of Captain Scott's Antarctic expedition. On the next day the cinema opened to the public and before long became known as the Oxford Picture House and in 1927 was renamed first the Oxford Theatre and four months later the New Oxford Theatre. By 1930 it was owned by the European Motion Picture Company Ltd and in 1949 was acquired by the Buxton Theatre Circuit. A wide screen was installed in 1954 and after a period of stiff competition with the two Rank cinemas in the street the New Oxford was taken over by the Rank Organisation in June 1960. After Rank introduced two and then three screens to the Odeon the New Oxford closed on 25 October 1980. After closure part of the ground floor was converted into a McDonald's fast food restaurant.
- Paramount Theatre was a 2,920-seat theatre opened in October 1930 opposite the Hippodrome. It was acquired by Odeon Cinemas in 1939 and reopened in 1940. It once had a fine theatre organ. It closed in 1973 to be converted into a two screen multiplex in January 1974 and converted into a triplex in 1979 and added four more screens in 1992. It closed in September 2004
- Regal Twins - Built in 1929-30 originally containing two large meeting halls over a parade of shops, before the interior of the halls was completed, they were converted into two cinemas with fashionable 1930 Art Deco interiors, the world's first multiplex in 1930. These were converted in 1972, to a five-screen complex (Studios 1 to 5) by Star Group, as the first five-cinema complex in Britain, before closing in the 1980s. In 1994 it became the Dancehouse Theatre.
- The Scala Cinema was on Wilmslow Road in Withington from 1912 to 2001.
- Trocadero Picture Palace - in Rusholme was opened in 1912 and closed in the 1970s.

== See also ==
- List of streets and roads in Manchester
- An Instinct for Detection: 1996 Lionrock album with a track named after the road
