= Two St Peter's Square =

High-rise office building in Manchester, England

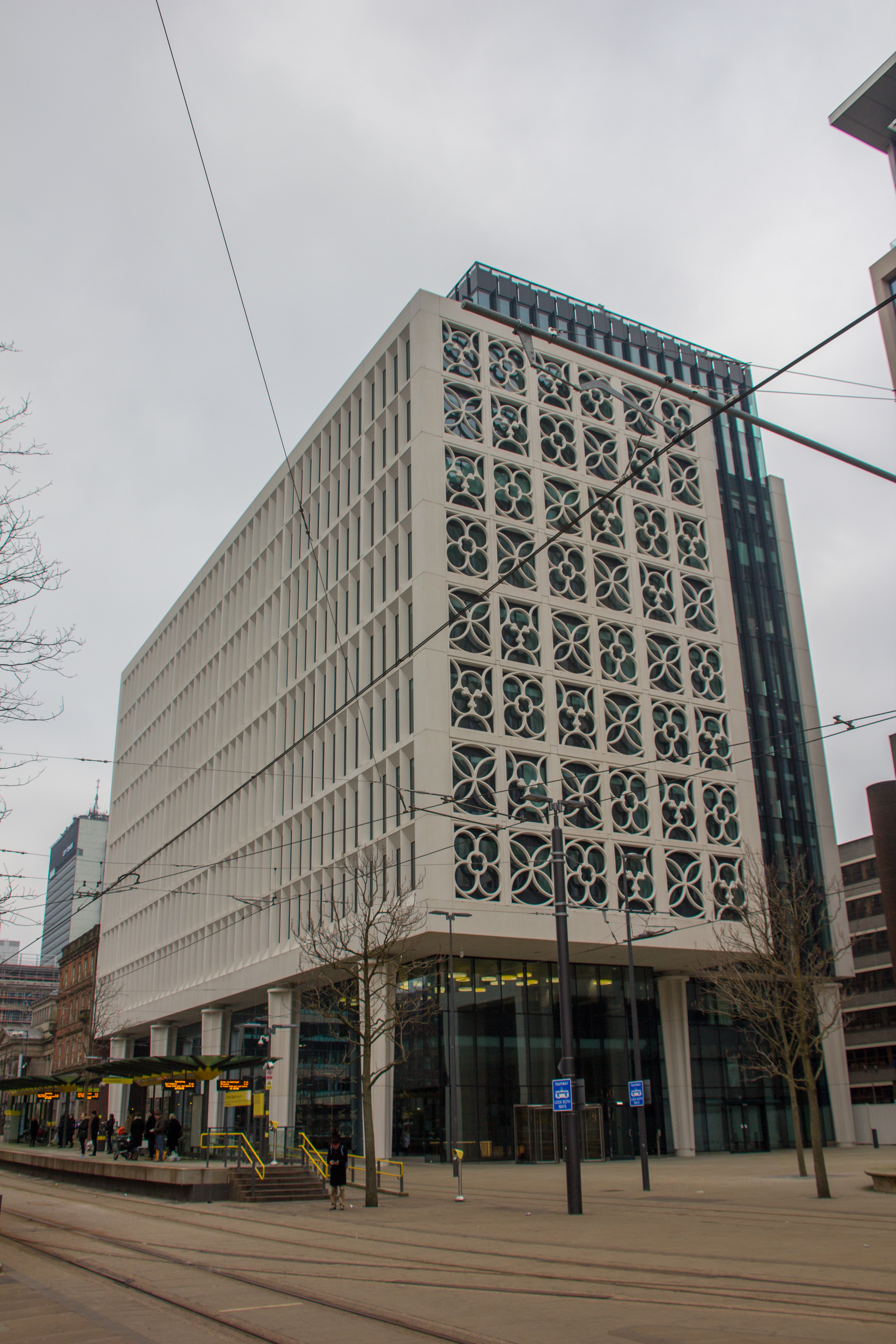
- The building in 2018

- Location within Greater Manchester

General information
- Type: High-rise office
- Architectural style: Modern classical
- Location: St Peter's Square, Manchester, England
- Coordinates: 53°28′41″N 2°14′33″W
- Construction started: 2015
- Completed: 2017
- Cost: £80 million

Height
- Height: 60 m (200 ft)

Technical details
- Floor count: 11
- Floor area: 162,000 sq ft (15,100 m^{2})

Design and construction
- Architect: SimpsonHaugh and Partners

Website
- 2sps.co.uk

Two St Peter's Square is a high-rise office building in St Peter's Square in Manchester city centre, England. Designed by SimpsonHaugh and Partners, the scheme attracted controversy because it involved the demolition of a 1930s Art Deco, but unlisted, building.

== Century House ==
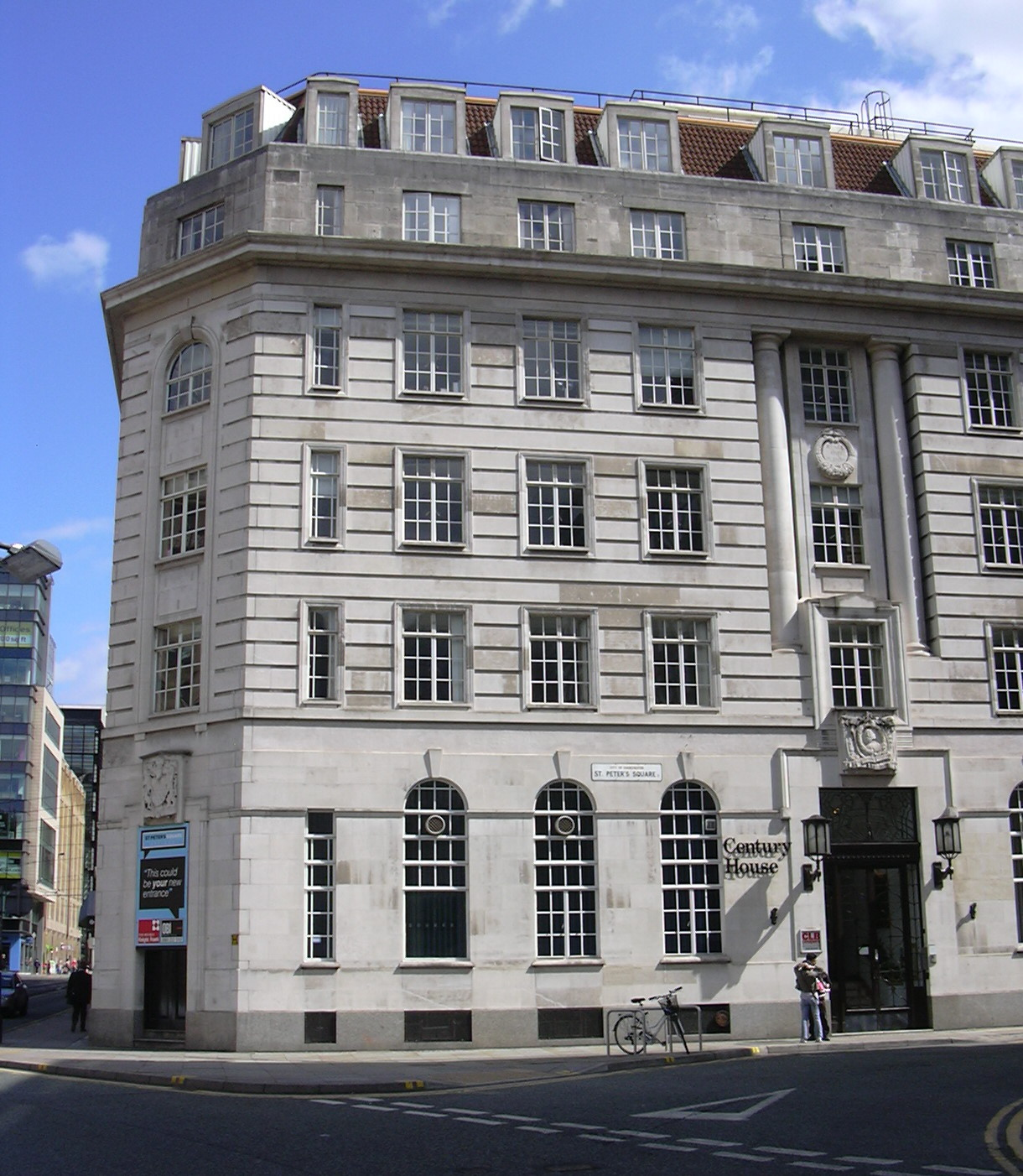
Century House in 2010

The site of Two St Peter's Square was previously occupied by four buildings: Century House, Sussex House, Bennett House and Clarendon House.

Century House was built in 1934 for the Friends Provident Society, a Quaker-friendly society that provided life insurance. It was constructed using Portland stone, and featured a relief sculpture of George Fox, as well as ornate carvings on the side of the six-storey building.

A campaign was started in June 2013 to save Century House. The Twentieth Century Society strongly objected to the plans to demolish the building. Manchester City Council approved the demolition of Century House on 25 July 2013.

== Two St Peter's Square ==
The new building contains 162,000 sq ft (15,100 m^{2}) of space over 11 storeys, consisting of 157,000 sq ft (14,600 m^{2}) of office space and 5,142 sq ft (477.7 m^{2}) of shops, as well as a 43-space basement car park. The building is faced with stone, with a complex lattice structure on the side. Plans were submitted in 2013, and it was completed in early 2017. It was a speculative development, with no pre-arranged tenants.

Separate posts to carry over tram cables were installed in August 2014 so the current assemblage of buildings could be demolished – before these were constructed, the cables were attached to the building structures. Hoardings and scaffolding were installed in November 2014 in preparation for demolition.

Three other high-rise blocks have been built adjacent to Two St Peter's Square: a 14-storey office building known as One St Peter's Square completed in 2014, a 14-storey office building named Landmark on the site of the former Odeon Cinema completed in 2019, and Three St Peter's Square, a 20-storey building containing a Motel One and Staycity aparthotel, completed in 2022.

== Occupancy ==
As of June 2026, the building is occupied by the Department for Work and Pensions, Ernst & Young (floor 8 mainly for UK and Ireland Audit and Tax; floor 9 mainly for Strategy and Transactions and Financial Services Audit; floor 10 for reception, IT services, terrace and major meeting rooms), Knights, Distrelec, Gravitas Recruitment Group, and Cazenove Capital, part of Schroders on floor 11. A Black Sheep Coffee shop and a Wagamama restaurant occupy the ground floor.
