= Greater Manchester Pension Fund =

The Greater Manchester Pension Fund is a pension fund for employees of various institutions in Greater Manchester, United Kingdom. It is run by Tameside Metropolitan Borough Council and follows the rules of the Local Government Pension Scheme.

With £23 billion in assets as of 2018, it is the largest local authority pension scheme in the UK and 9th largest pension fund in the UK (including private companies) overall.

== Employers included in GMPF ==
Participating employers include:

- All ten Greater Manchester local authorities
- Contracted out employees of the local authorities
- Most further education colleges and numerous schools and Academies in Greater Manchester
- University of Bolton
- University of Salford
- Manchester Metropolitan University
- Royal Northern College of Music
- Transport for Greater Manchester
- Probation Service
- Greater Manchester Police (police staff).

== Investments ==
It includes the Greater Manchester Property Venture Fund, which invests in properties including One St Peter's Square, The Soapworks (formerly the Colgate-Palmolive factory) in Salford Quays and housing managed by Places for People. Most investments are in Stock Market shares and securities. Greater Manchester Pension Fund has one of the highest proportions among UK Pension of funds invested in fossil fuel stocks and is the subject of a divestment campaign.
