= Odeon Cinema, Manchester =

Former building in Manchester, England (1930–2017)

Odeon Cinema
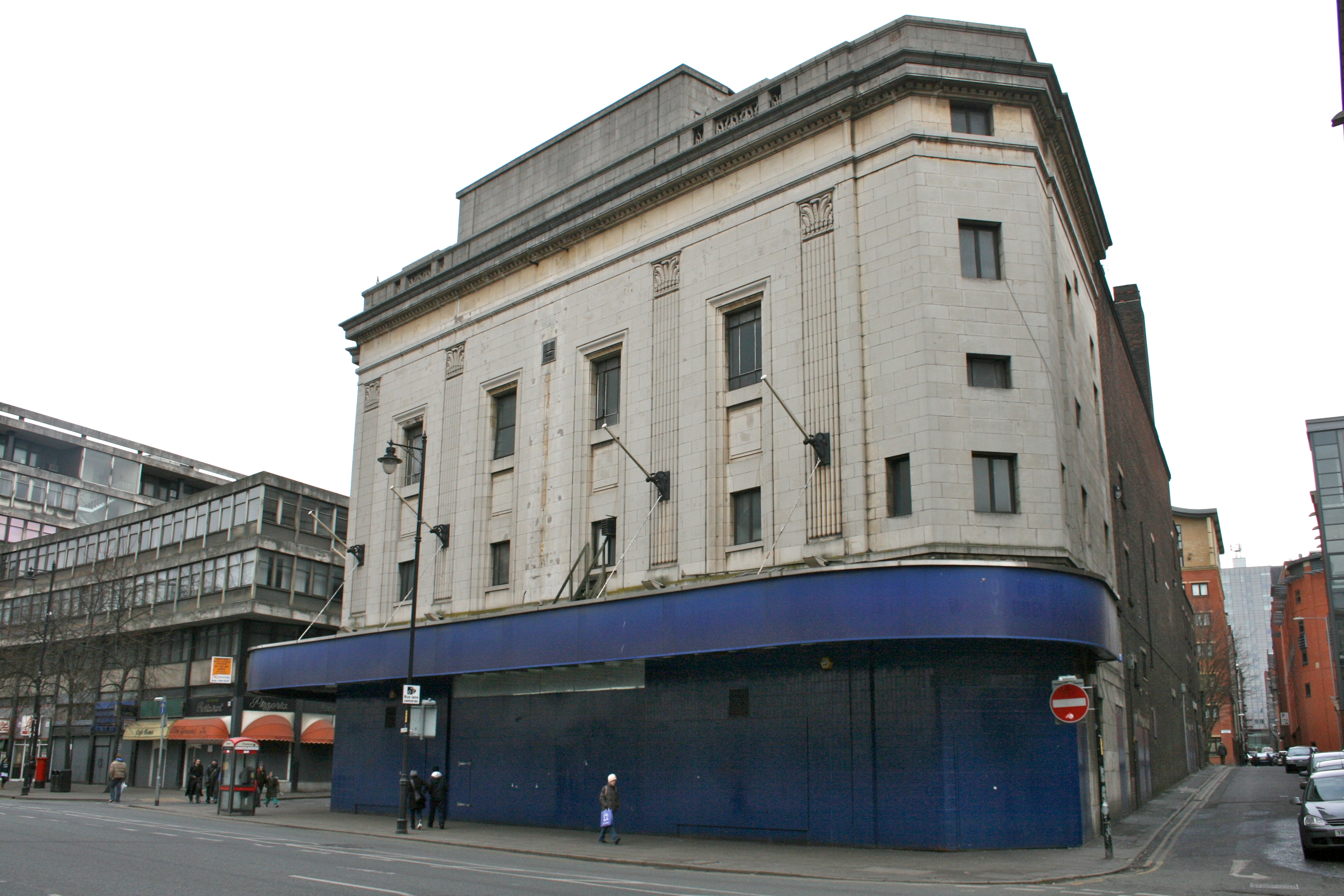
- The former cinema in 2009

- Location within Greater Manchester

General information
- Status: Demolished
- Type: Cinema
- Location: Oxford Street, Manchester, England
- Coordinates: 53°28′37″N 2°14′34″W
- Opening: October 1930
- Closed: September 2004
- Demolished: April 2017

Design and construction
- Developer: Frank Verity and S. Beverley

The Odeon Cinema (originally known as the Paramount Theatre or the Paramount Cinema) was a former Odeon Cinema on Oxford Street in Manchester, England. It was close to St Peter's Square, within the Civic Quarter of Manchester city centre. It was demolished in April 2017, and replaced by Landmark, a 14-storey office building, as part of a major transformation of the area.

== Site ==
The location of the theatre was originally developed near the end of the 18th century. By the 1830s it had been fully developed into a mix of commercial and residential properties. By the start of the 20th century, it was used entirely for commercial purposes, including two pubs. It was cleared by 1930 for the construction of the Paramount Theatre.

== Theatre and cinema ==
The Paramount Theatre on Oxford Street opened on 6 October 1930, showing The Love Parade, and featuring a variety show on stage. The theatre was built for the Paramount Film Company of America, and was designed by Frank Verity and S. Beverley (now known as Verity & Beverley), who had also built the Plaza Theatre in London. It was one of 50 proposed Paramount Theatres, and was one of the first open, and the first in the UK to bear the company's name; others included Paramount Leeds, Paramount Newcastle upon Tyne, Paramount Glasgow, Paramount Liverpool, Paramount Birmingham and Paramount Tottenham Court Road, London.

A single-screen cinema, it was capable of seating 2,920 people on two levels (the Stalls and the Balcony), and the building also contained a fully equipped stage, a fly tower, dressing rooms, an orchestra pit, an organ and a cafe. The cinema was designed to operate in the cine-variety era; it was mostly used to show films (such as those featuring Maurice Chevalier and Jeanette MacDonald) but it also put on live stage shows (including those by Francis A. Mangan, which were accompanied by a full orchestra). It was purchased in November 1939 by Oscar Deutsch as part of Odeon Theatres Ltd, and was renamed as the Odeon in 1940. It became a Rank cinema in 1941. Its piano lounge subsequently hosted Bruce Forsyth among others.

The building featured a stone-faced façe with four bays, and a full-width canopy, both facing Oxford Street. The cinema had three levels, one of which was a mezzanine. The foyers and auditorium were decorated in a Baroque style; the building also had a large rounded proscenium and an illustration of the sky on the ceiling.

The theatre was divided in 1973 to become a twin screen cinema, at which time the organ was removed. It gained a third screen in 1979, and four more screens were added in 1992 using the basement and stage areas; it opened as a seven-screen cinema on 8 May 1992. The cinema had a private car park with a small number of parking spaces to the rear. In 1992 it hosted the premiere of A Few Good Men.

The theatre originally had a Wurlitzer Publix One theatre organ with four manuals and 20 ranks of pipes, specified by Jesse Crawford. This was the only Publix One to leave the United States. When the theatre was divided, the organ was acquired by the Lancastrian Theatre Organ Trust, loaned to the City of Manchester and relocated to the Free Trade Hall (a process which took four years); and was first used there in September 1977. When the Free Trade Hall closed, it was subsequently moved to Stockport Town Hall's Great Hall.

In 1999 the building was considered for listed status as part of a thematic survey of cinemas, but it was rejected because too many of its original features had been removed. The cinema closed in September 2004 after 74 years in use, owing to competition from the AMC Great Northern. After its closure, it was occasionally used as a church. When the cinema closed, the orchestra pit, stage, proscenium, ceiling and foyer areas were still partly intact (although concealed) and could have been restored. It was thought to be the oldest cinema in Manchester city centre. Another assessment in February 2007 also rejected the listing. English Heritage explained that this was due to the extensive removal of original features and significant interior damage. It stated that the damage had been "systematic and methodical", which the owners attributed to "limited and entirely lawful exposure works". The building was certified as immune from listing on 25 July 2007, with the certificate renewed on 28 November 2012. Permission to demolish the building was granted in September 2016, and it was subsequently demolished in April 2017.

== Office building ==
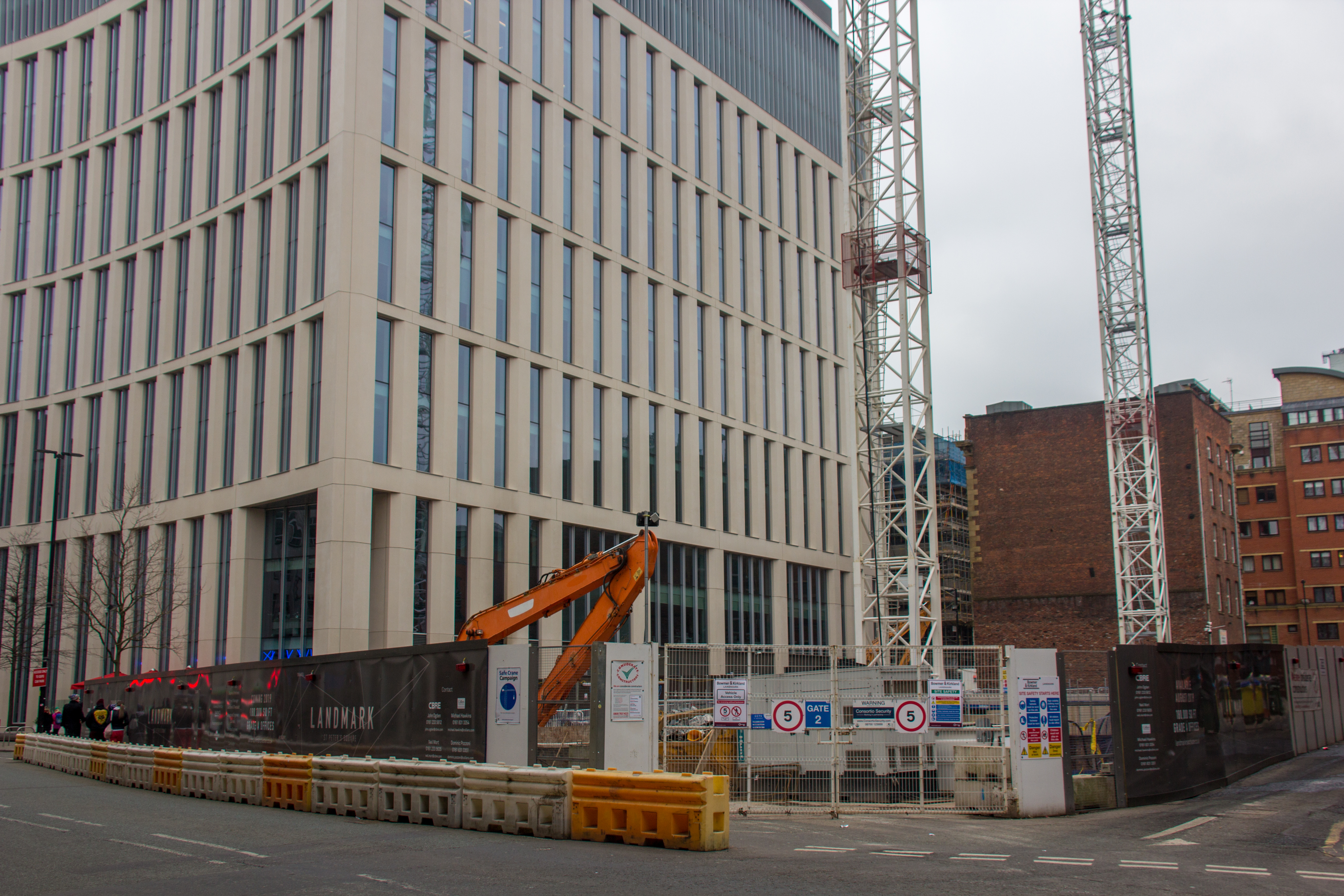
The site of the cinema after demolition

In 2013 the cinema was scheduled to be replaced with an office building named Landmark, matching the adjacent One St Peter's Square. The building was proposed to have 22,575 m^{2} (243,000 sq ft) of office floor space over 14 storeys, as well as a three-level 116-space basement car park, on a 0.18 hectares (0.44 acres) site. The developers were Hines UK Limited and Manchester & Metropolitan Properties Limited, with designs by Squire and Partners.

Planning permission was originally obtained on 15 February 2007, and was due to be completed in 2009. At the time, the building aimed to hold 2,000 workers, and would cost £45 million. The permission was extended in September 2010 and renewed in August 2013, with some amendments to meet BREEAM 'excellent' standards. Construction was planned to start when market conditions were suitable – in particular, when pre-let deals were arranged with the first occupants.

Following the cinema's demolition in April 2017, the replacement building was subsequently constructed in 2018–19.

As of January 2023, occupants within the building include Santander UK, Allianz, JLL, RSM, HSBC, Grant Thornton, and flexible workspace provider Industrious.
