= Manchester Town Hall Extension =

Municipal building in Manchester, England

Town Hall Extension
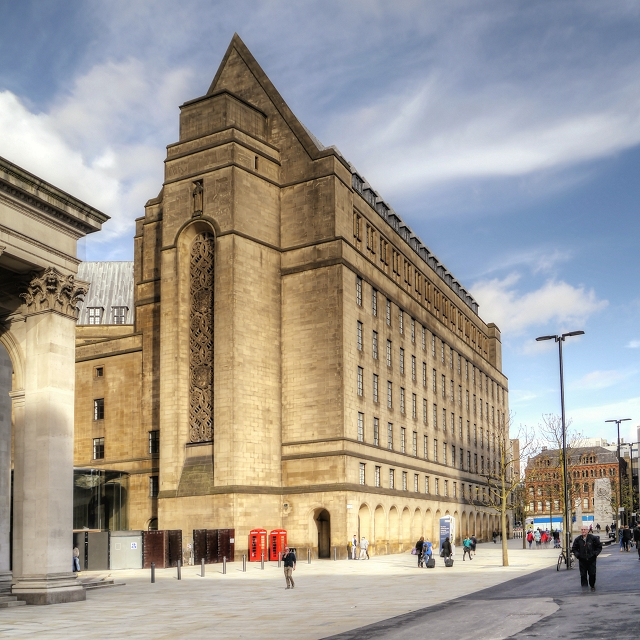

- Location within Greater Manchester

General information
- Type: Municipal building
- Architectural style: Gothic Revival
- Location: Manchester, England
- Coordinates: 53.4786°N 2.2443°W
- Construction started: 1934
- Completed: 1938
- Opening: 1938
- Renovated: 2011
- Cost: £750,000
- Owner: Manchester City Council

Technical details
- Floor count: 8

Design and construction
- Architect: E. Vincent Harris
- Designations

Listed Building – Grade II*
- Official name: Manchester Town Hall Extension
- Designated: 2 October 1974
- Reference no.: 1197917

Manchester Town Hall Extension was built between 1934 and 1938 to provide additional accommodation for local government services. It was built between St Peter's Square and Lloyd Street in Manchester city centre, England. English Heritage designated it a grade II* listed building on 2 October 1974. Its eclectic style was designed to be a link between the ornate Gothic Revival Manchester Town Hall and the Classical architecture of the Central Library.

== Architecture ==
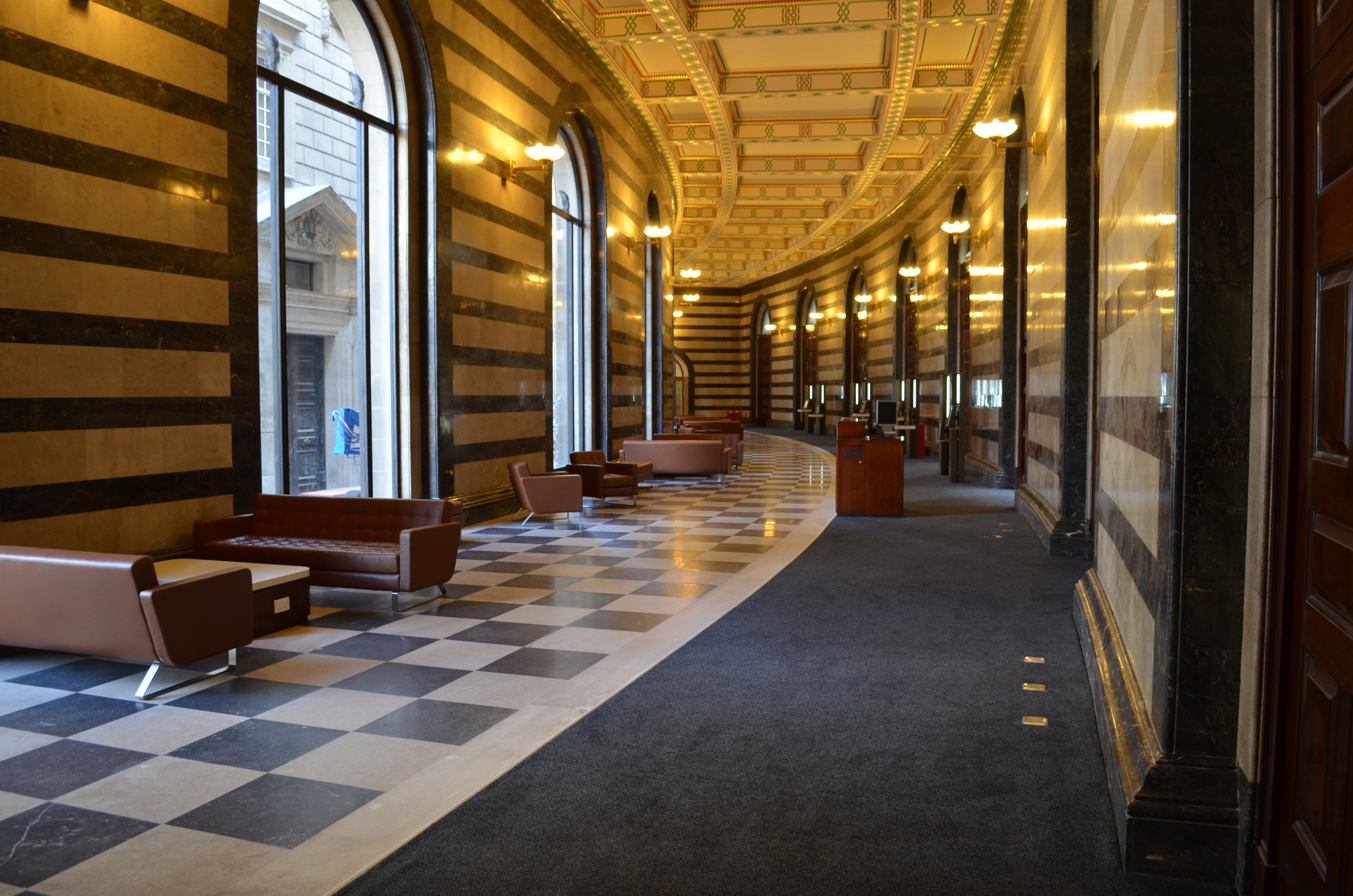
The refurbished Rates Hall in 2014

The Town Hall Extension, housing municipal departments including rates, rents, and street cleaning departments, was built after a competition in 1927 was won by E. Vincent Harris who, in the same year, won a competition to build Manchester Central Library on an adjacent site. The building, built by J. Gerrard & Sons Ltd of Swinton, is essentially Gothic in character, with ornately carved tracery and a steeply pitched roof interpreted in a contemporary style. The Manchester City Architect G. Noel Hill was involved with the scheme. The building was started after the Central Library was completed and originally had a rates hall, and gas and electricity showrooms on the ground floor; a cinema was built at basement level and on the first floor is a council chamber. The building cost £750,000 and was opened by King George VI in 1938, the occasion commemorated by a carved inset stone at the Mount Street end.

The building is linked to Manchester Town Hall by two covered bridges at first-floor level over Lloyd Street and has an irregular plan with a concave south side facing the Central Library. Its curved four-storey range with round-headed arches and small windows facing Library Walk is 200 feet (61 m) in length. The eight-storey building has attics and a basement. It was constructed with a steel frame clad in ashlar sandstone from Darley Dale and a steeply pitched slate roof. The Lloyd Street façade has 29 windows, five of which are set back and its seventh and eighth storeys are set behind a parapet. The 17-window façade to St Peter's Square has small rectangular windows up to the parapet and two-light mullioned windows to the sixth and seventh floors, and its attic dormers have hipped roofs and wooden cross-windows. Along these façades, on the ground floor, is a continuous arcade of plain round-headed openings and a chamfered coping. The upper floors on the Lloyd Street and St Peter's Square façades have a horizontal band over the first floor. The Mount Street façade has five large oriel windows filled with mullion-and-transom windows. The gable ends on Mount Street and St Peter's Square have stair-turrets with round-headed arches containing windows with geometric tracery. Above them are niches with statues. Its stained-glass windows representing Lancastrian coats of arms were designed by George Kruger Gray.

Charles Reilly, a contemporary architecture critic, thought the extension was "dull" and "drab" while Nikolaus Pevsner considered it was Harris's "best job".

== Refurbishment ==
Manchester City Council restored and refurbished the Town Hall Extension and the Central Library from 2010–14 to include a public service hub to make its services more accessible. The public entrances on Mount Street and St Peter's Square were restored to their 1930s appearance and staircases to the lower ground floor were reinstated to access the Central Library which was extended into the basement. The rates hall was restored. The project, delivered by Laing O'Rourke, won the Construction News Judges Supreme Award in June 2015. It was described as an almost impossibly complex project completed on schedule and within budget.

== See also ==
- Grade II* listed buildings in Greater Manchester
- Listed buildings in Manchester-M2
