= St Peter's Square, Manchester =

Public square in Manchester, England

St Peter's Square
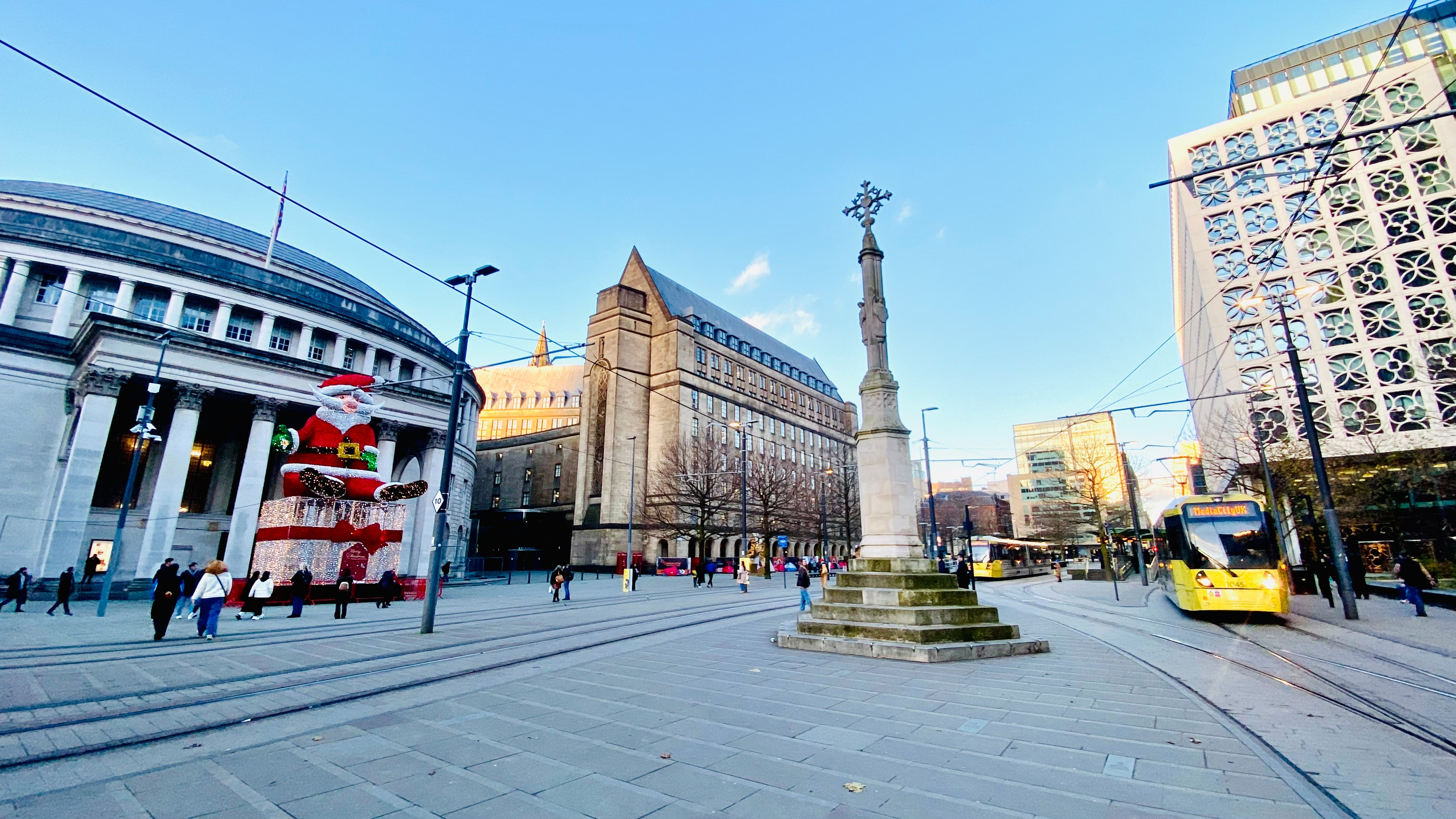
- St Peter's Square in 2024

- Location within Greater Manchester
- Maintained by: City of Manchester
- Location: Manchester, England
- Postal code: M1
- Nearest metro station: St Peter's Square tram stop
- Coordinates: 53°28′40″N 2°14′37″W

Construction
- Construction start: 1790s
- Completed: 1930s

Other
- Known for: Peterloo Massacre (1819)

St Peter's Square is a public square in Manchester city centre, England. The north of the square is bounded by Princess Street and the south by Peter Street. To the west of the square is Manchester Central Library, Midland Hotel and Manchester Town Hall Extension. At the centre of the square is St Peter's Square Metrolink tram stop, a major transport interchange. The square is also home to the Manchester Cenotaph, and the statue by Emmeline Pankhurst, Rise up, Women. In 1819, the area around the square was the site of the Peterloo Massacre.

From 2010 to 2017, the square underwent significant redevelopment which entailed the restoration of Central Library and attached Library Walk link, the relocation of the Cenotaph to the rear of Manchester Town Hall, the creation of a new extended tram stop and the construction of two new office blocks to the south of the square; One St Peter's Square and Two St Peter's Square.

== History ==
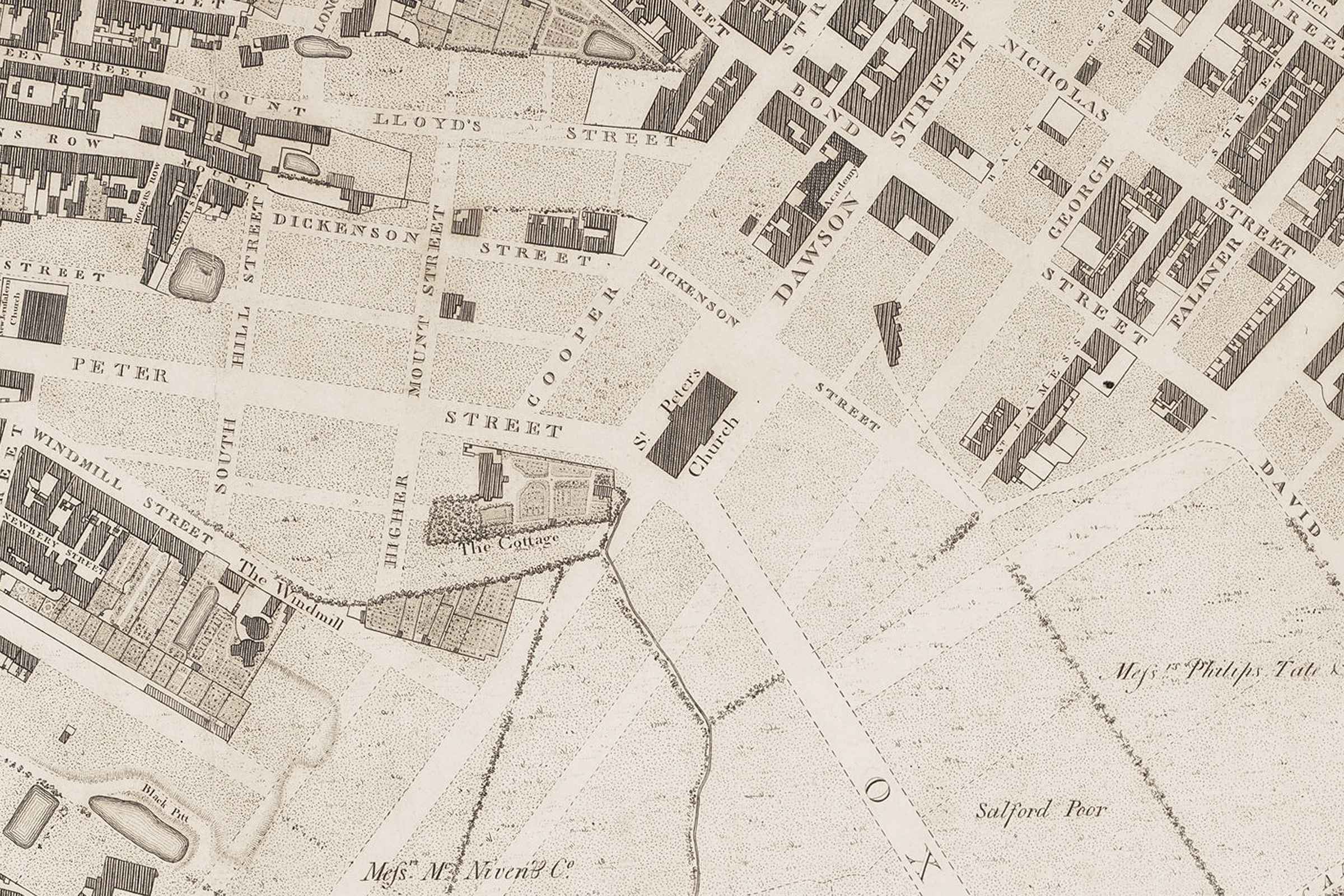
1794 map of St Peter's Square; preliminary routes for Oxford Street and Peter Street have been laid out over surrounding fields

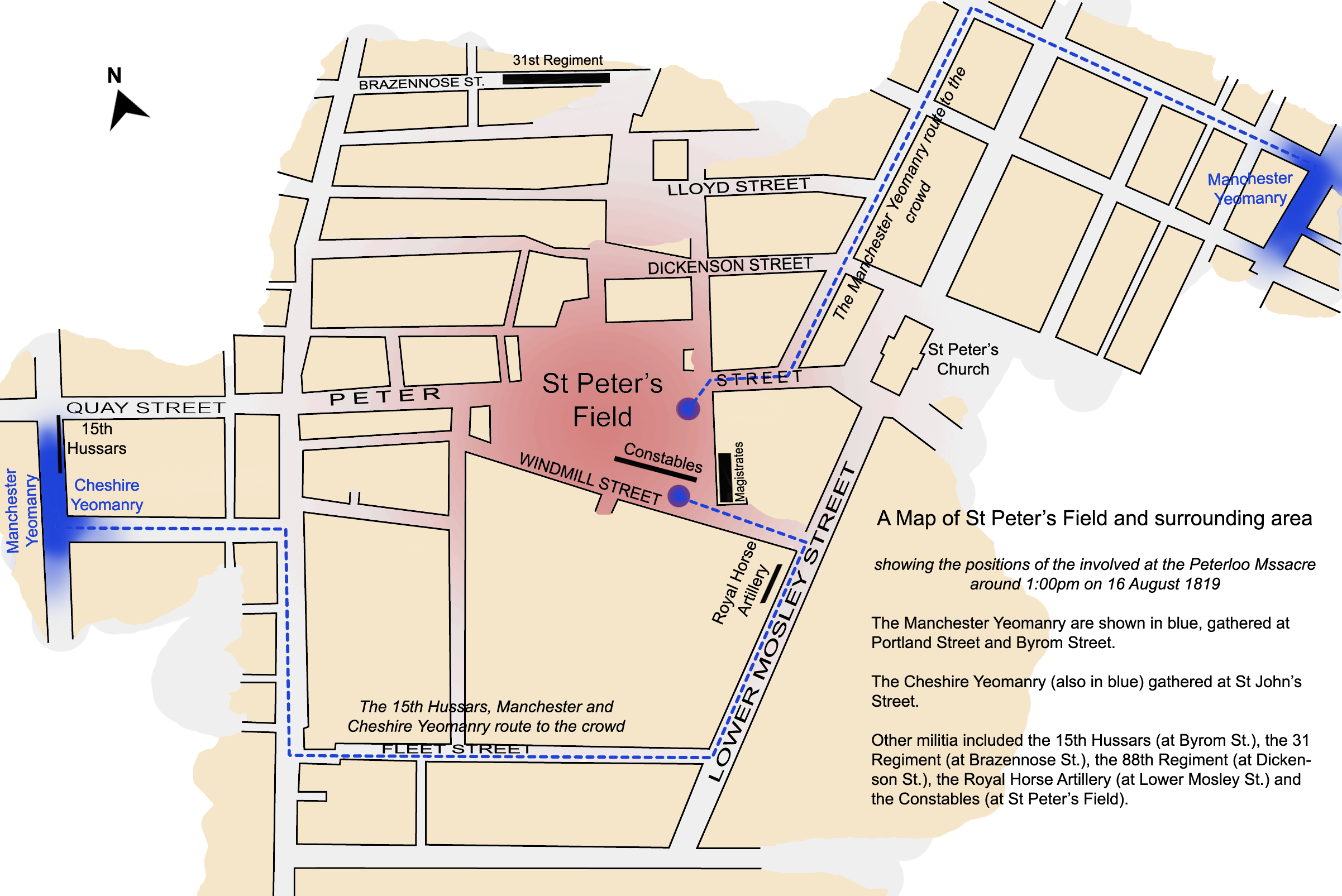
Map showing the events of the Peterloo Massacre at St Peter's Field on 16 August 1819

Up to the turn of the 18th and 19th centuries, the area now occupied by St Peter's Square was at the edge of the town of Manchester, bounded by countryside on its south, west and east sides, with open fields running down to the River Medlock. With the onset of the Industrial Revolution, Manchester's population was growing, and a new church, St Peter's Church, was built on this site 1788-94 to serve the expanding population. The church was built in the neoclassical style by the architect James Wyatt, and was once famous for its church music. The church's dedication to Saint Peter gave its name to nearby locations: by 1801, a public square name St Peter's Square was laid out around the church, and Peter Street, along with adjoining Oxford Street, were being established.

The open fields to the west became known as St Peter's Field, also named after the church. In 1819, a crowd of protestors gathered here demanding Parliamentary reform; this protest was violently put down by army forces. James Wroe, editor of the Manchester Observer, condemned the military action and coined the name "Peterloo Massacre", a portmanteau of "St Peter's Field" and "Waterloo", in reference to the Battle of Waterloo that had taken place four years earlier. Thus, St Peter's Church gave its name not only to the surrounding locations, but also to one of the most prominent violent events in British political history. (Note: The Peter's Fields name has recently been revived by property developers for the area to the west of the square.)

As Manchester grew into a large industrial city, the middle classes moved out of the city centre to live in the suburbs, and the residential population of the Manchester parish dwindled. St Peter's Church became redundant and it was demolished in 1907. Today, a stone cross, erected in 1908, marks the site of the former church.

From the 1860s, the south side of the square was occupied by the Prince's Theatre, a popular entertainment venue designed by the architect Edward Salomons and opened in 1864. The theatre closed in 1940 and was sold to ABC Cinemas. It was later demolished, but due to the contraints of World War II, the planned new cinema was not built.

In 1903, the Midland Hotel opened on the junction of Peter Street and Lower Mosley Street facing St Peter's Square. This large, ornate building was designed by Charles Trubshaw in Edwardian Baroque style and is clad in red brick, brown terracotta and polished granite. It was built as a railway hotel by the Midland Railway to serve the adjacent Manchester Central railway station, which had been opened in 1880.

=== 20th century ===
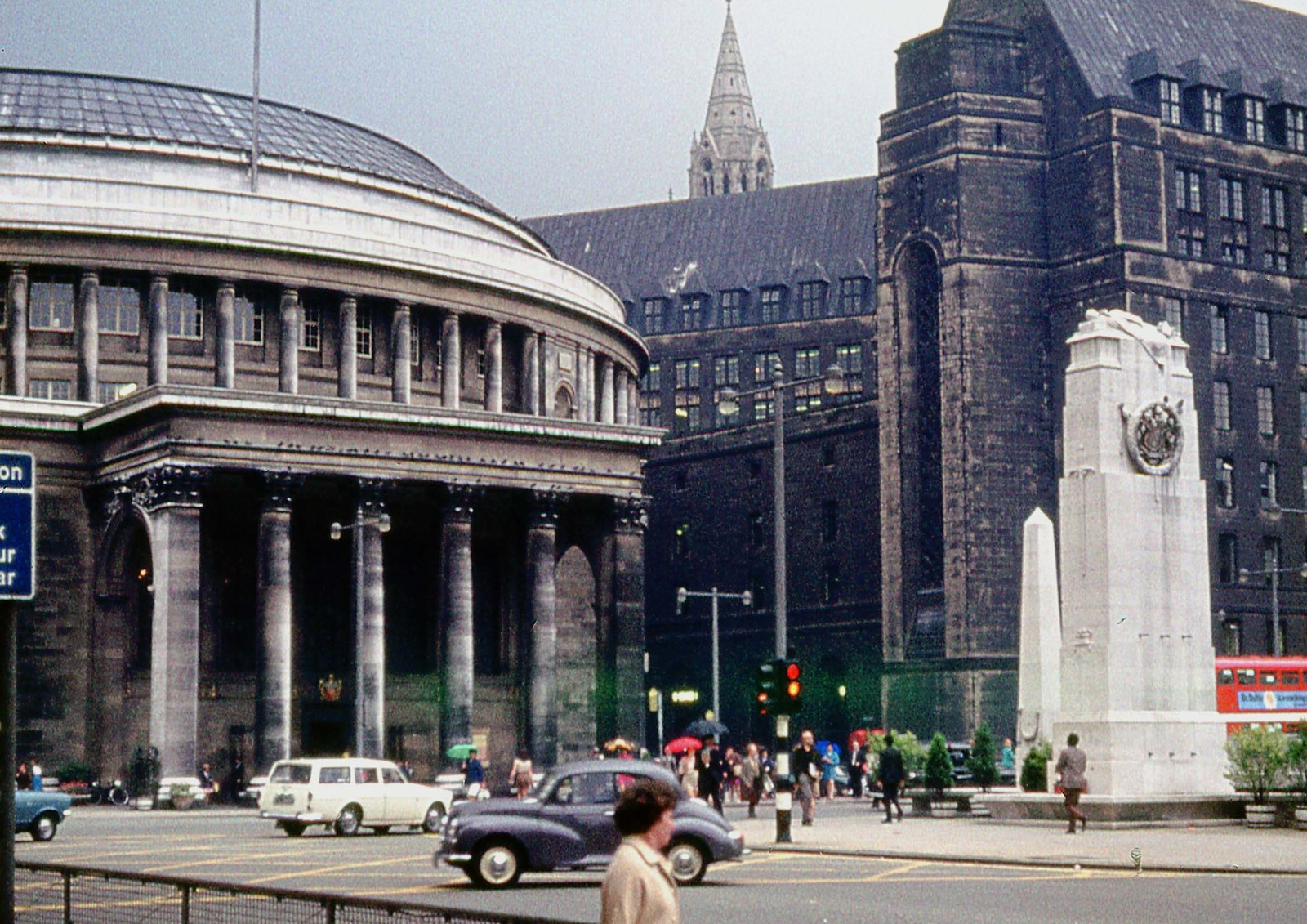
St Peters Square in 1969, with the Manchester Cenotaph in its original location in front of Manchester Central Library

In the aftermath of World War I, a war memorial was commissioned and it was decided to locate it in St Peter's Square. It was initially proposed that the St Peter's cross should be removed to make way for the new memorial, but the decision was taken to retain the cross and situate the monument in front of it. The Manchester Cenotaph, designed by Edwin Lutyens, was erected in 1924, and in 1949, the site was laid out with a garden designed by Leonard Cecil Howitt. The square is the site for the city's Remembrance Day commemoration each year.

In the 1930s, the square underwent significant redevelopment. Architect Vincent Harris won a competition to build the new Manchester Central Library on the western side of the square, on the junction with Peter Street. Opened in 1934, the library is a large circular building fronted with a portico of Corinthian columns. Harris's design was influenced by the Pantheon, Rome as well as by contemporary library buildings in the US. Harris also won the contract for the neighbouring building, the Town Hall Extension, built 1934-38, an addition to the ornate Gothic Revival Manchester Town Hall. The curved southern facade of the extension complements Harris's adjacent library building, forming Library Walk from the square to Lloyd Street.

In the Postwar Era, new Modernist buildings were erected in St Peter's Square. The vacant site of the Prince's Theatre was filled by Rediffusion House (later named Peter House), designed by the architects Ansell & Bailey for the television company Rediffusion and completed in 1957. The 11-storey building is clad in Portland stone and notably is built on a curve to match the ben in Oxford Street. In 1971, Elisabeth House was built on the south-east side of the square, adjoining Oxford Street. The concrete-framed building was designed by the architects Cruikshank & Seward. It was originally intended to be clad in stone to complement neighbouring buildings, but due to a limited budget, the developer used concrete facing instead.

In 1980, Manchester City Council declared Manchester a Nuclear-free city, and marked this designation by laying out a Peace Garden in the northern part of St Peter's Square.

In the later 20th century, as the city's transport network developed, St Peter's Square began to emerge as a potential location for a rapid transit station. In the 1970s, proposals for the Picc-Vic tunnel envisaged the construction of an underground railway station to serve both St Peter's and the neighbouring Albert Square. These plans were later abandoned. The early proposals for an on-street light rail system in Manchester revived the idea of a station in the square, and the idea was retained as the project evolved, becoming a reality when the Metrolink system opened in 1992.

=== 21st century redevelopment ===
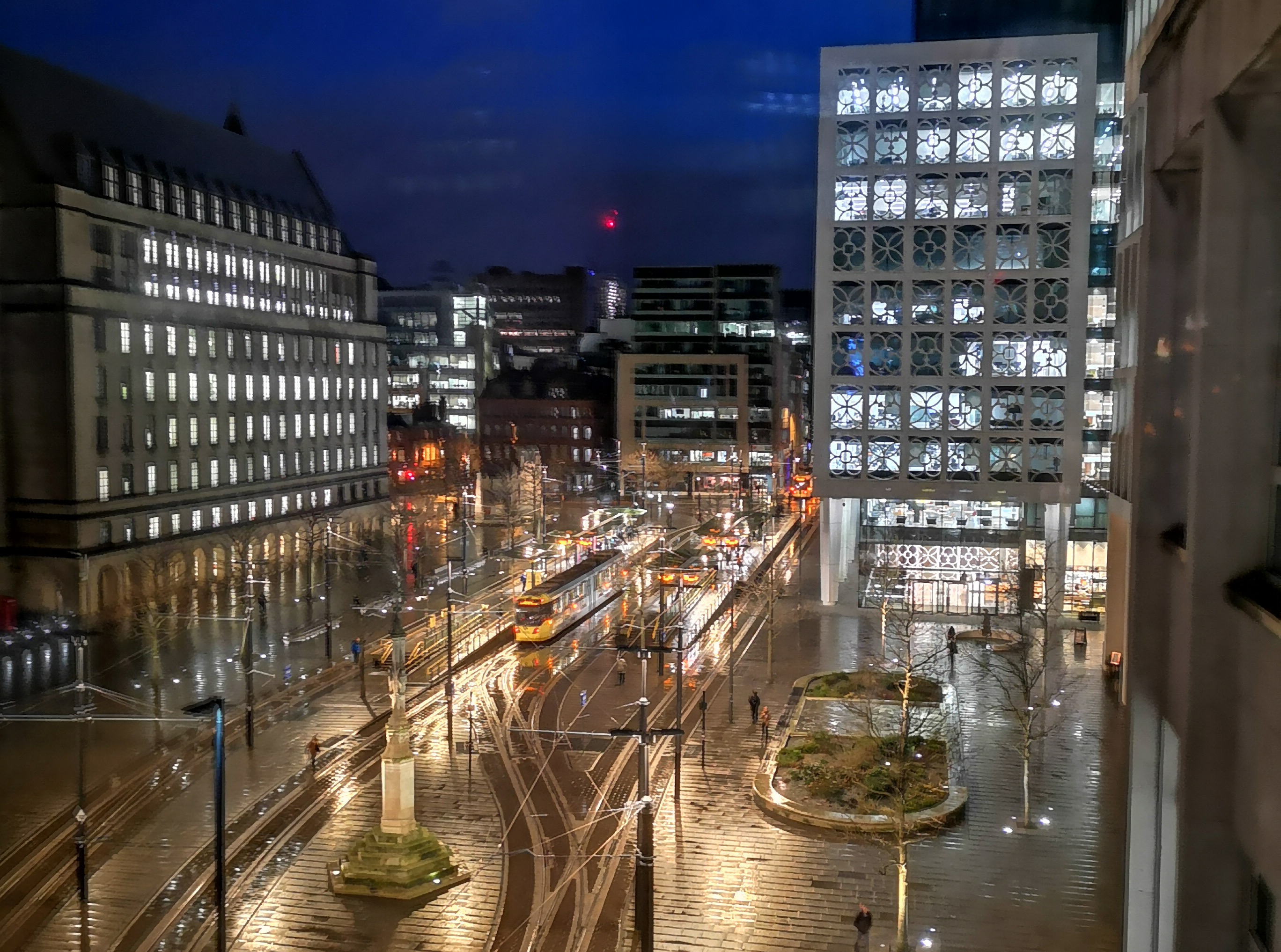
Night view of the redeveloped St Peters Square in 2019, with new buildings on the east side and an expanded tram interchange

In 2013, Manchester City Council approved plans for the redevelopment of the square, including the expansion of the Metrolink stop to four platforms. This coincided with the construction of the One and Two St Peter's Square buildings and the refurbishment of Manchester Central Library, both adjacent to the square.

The £20 million scheme involved moving the Cenotaph, demolishing the Art Deco Century House to establish a new office quarter and closing Library Walk to the public. The Peace Garden was moved to a new location in nearby Lincoln Square. The Manchester Modernist Society objected to the planned alterations to the square, arguing that the collection of Lutyens' Cenotaph and Central Library and the Town Hall extension formed "one of the best inter-war ensembles in the country", and criticising the scheme as "bland and insipid". The Twentieth Century Society argued for the retention of Century House. English Heritage stated that the loss of Century House would be outweighed by "public benefits"."

Numerous archaeological finds were made when construction work uncovered the former crypt of the long-demolished St. Peter's Church, which had a concrete raft built over it in order to safely construct the new tram lines. The outline of the church is marked in the paving around the square.

Notable buildings around St Peter's Square

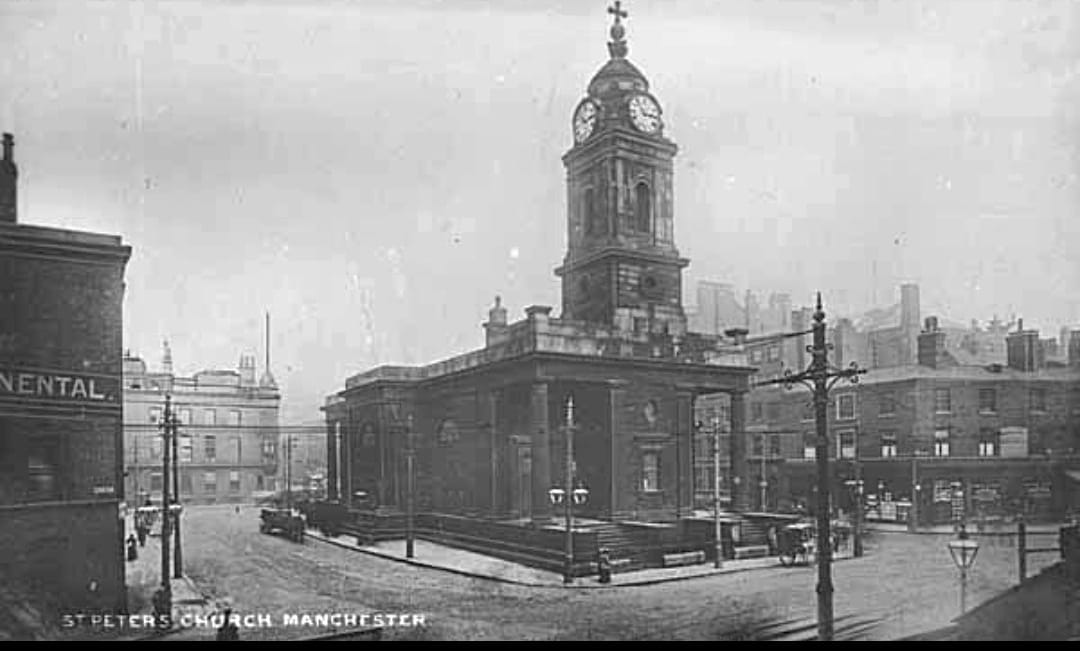
St Peter's Church (James Wyatt, 1794, demolished 1907)

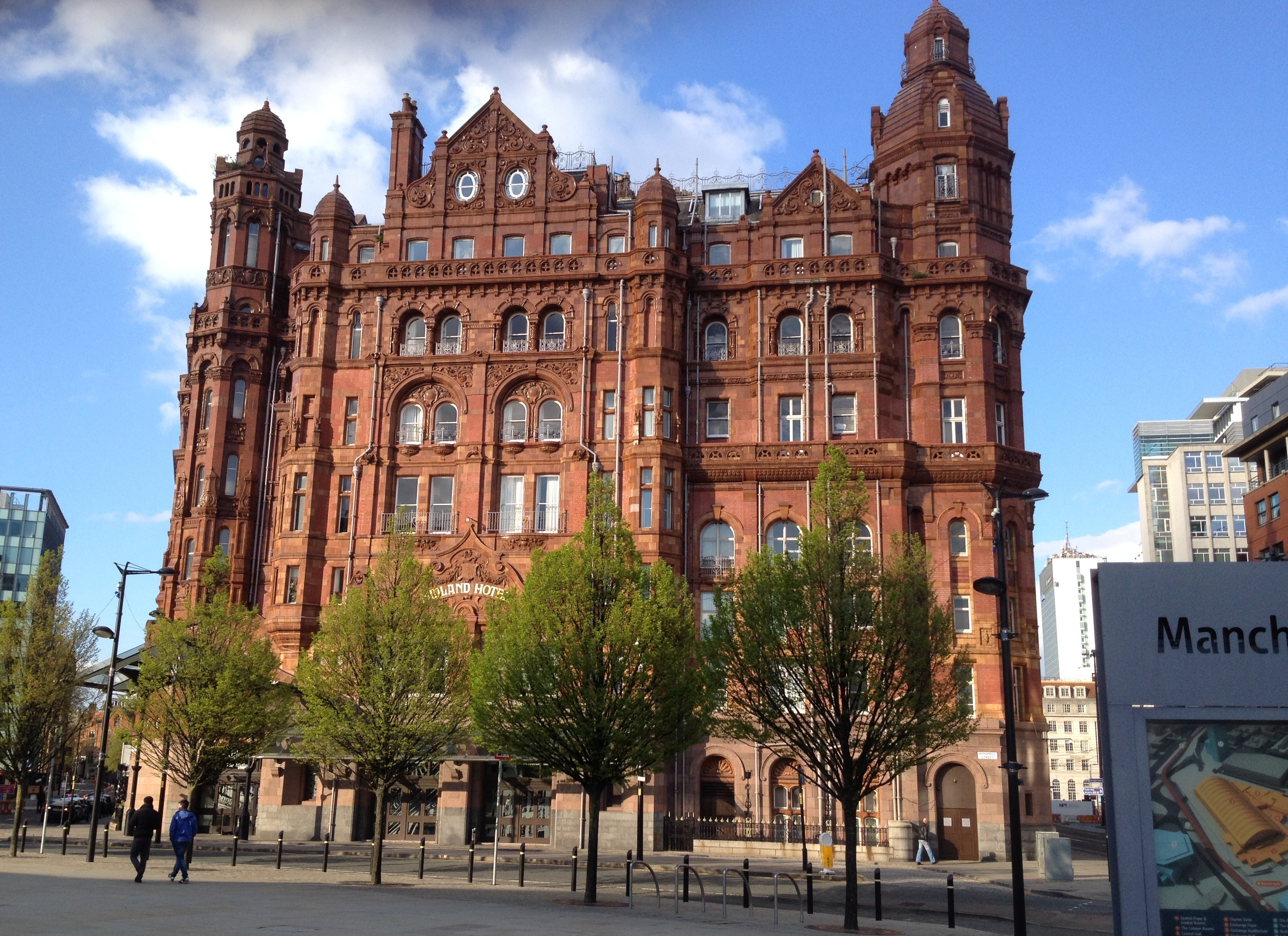
The Midland Hotel (Charles Trubshaw, 1903)

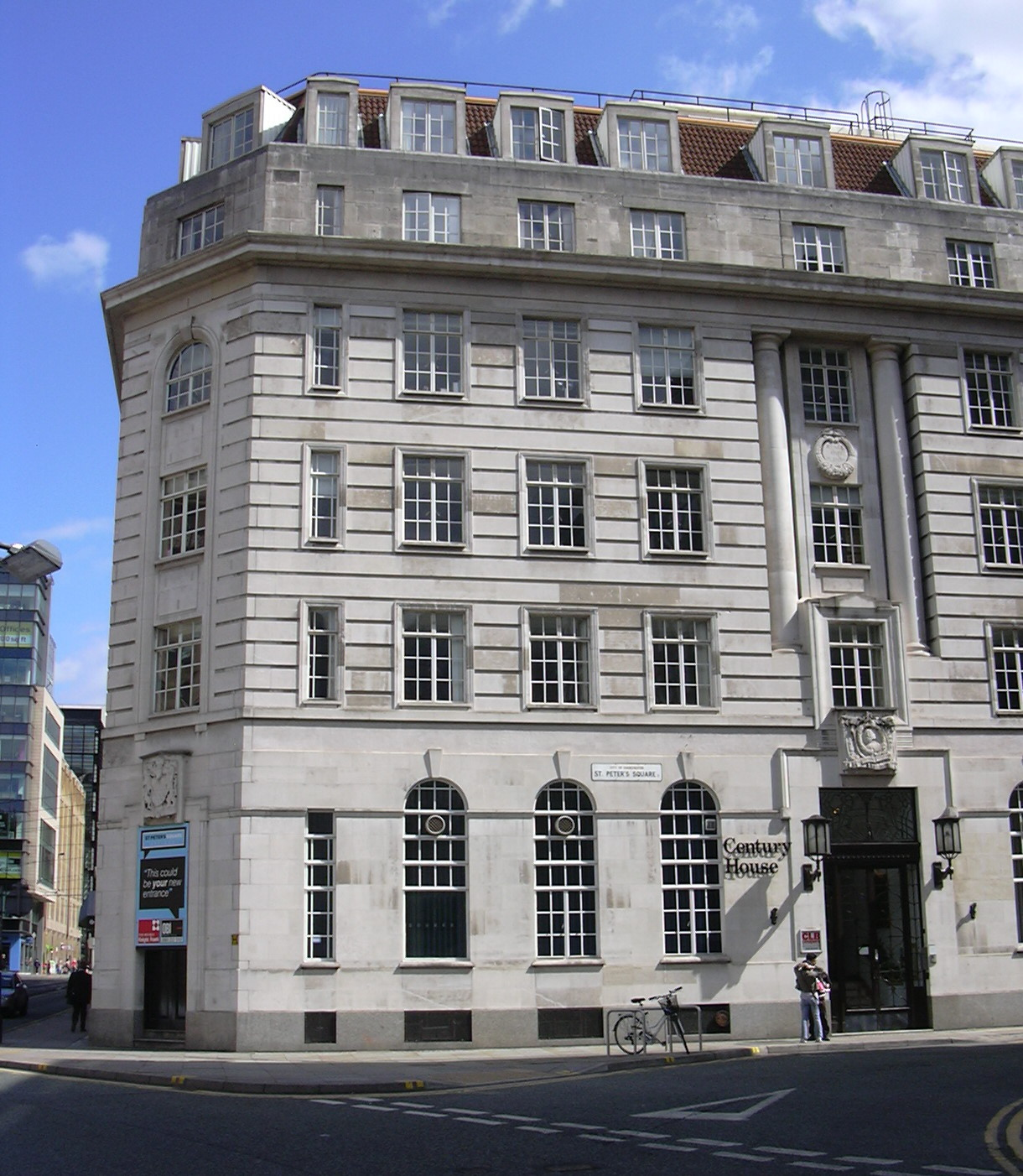
Century House (A W Roques, 1934, demolished 2014)

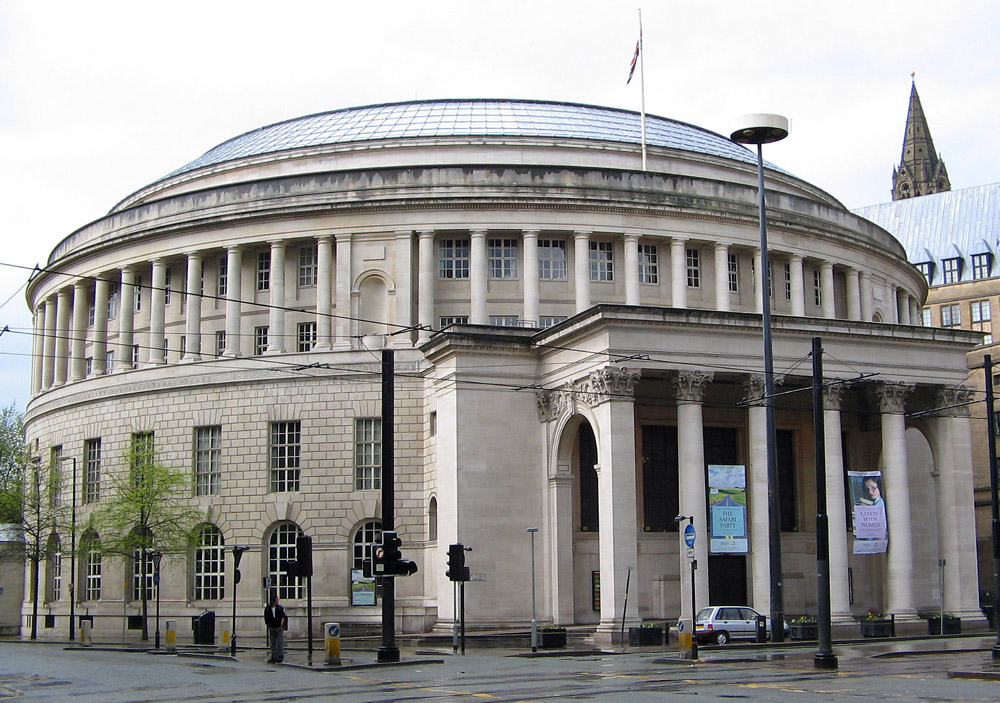
Manchester Central Library (Vincent Harris, 1934)

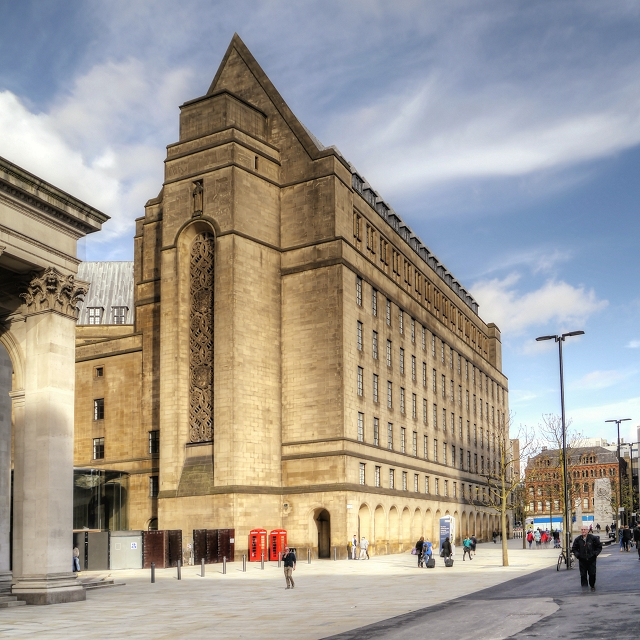
Manchester Town Hall Extension (Vincent Harris, 1938)

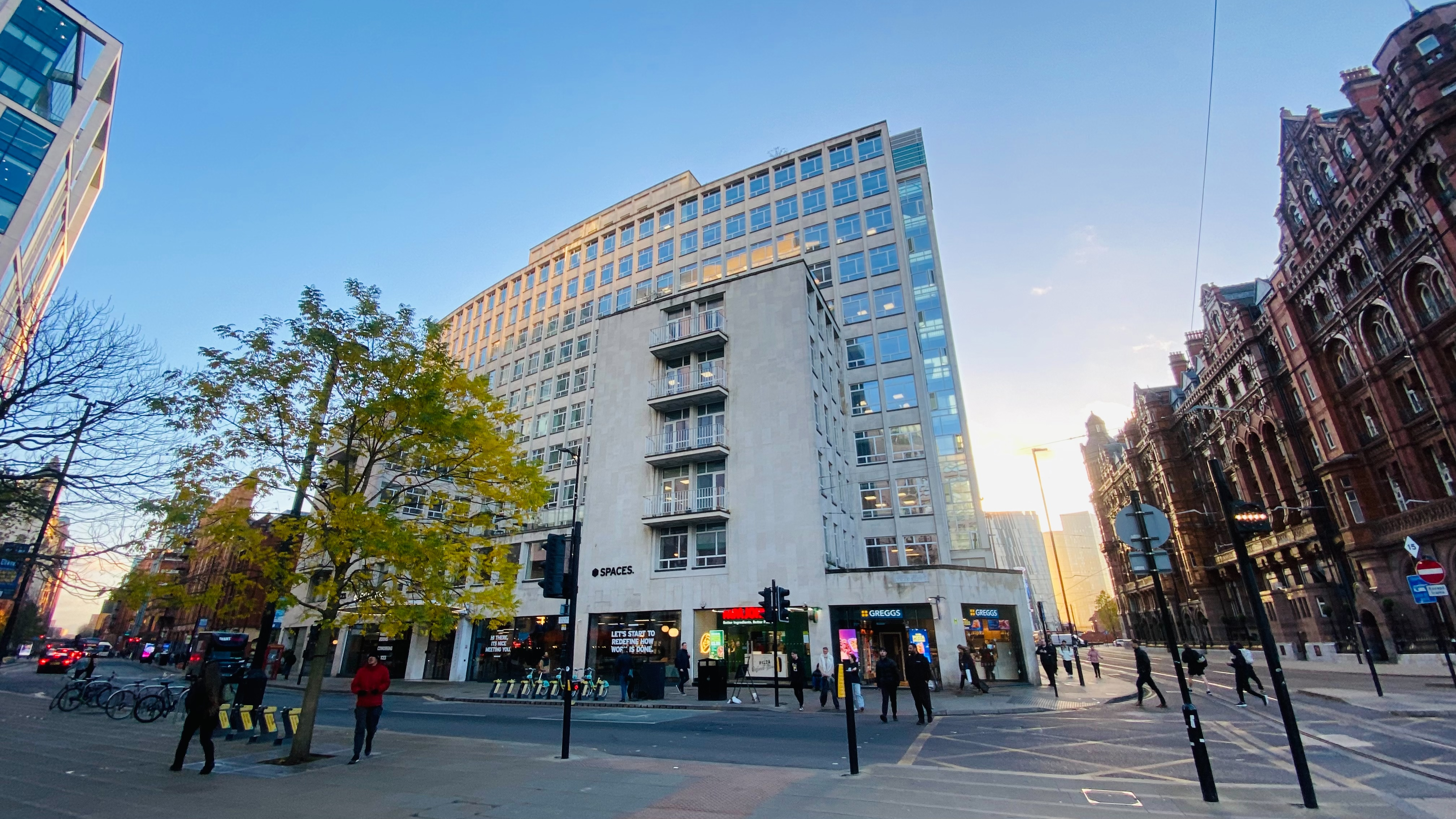
Peter House (Ansell & Bailey, 1958)

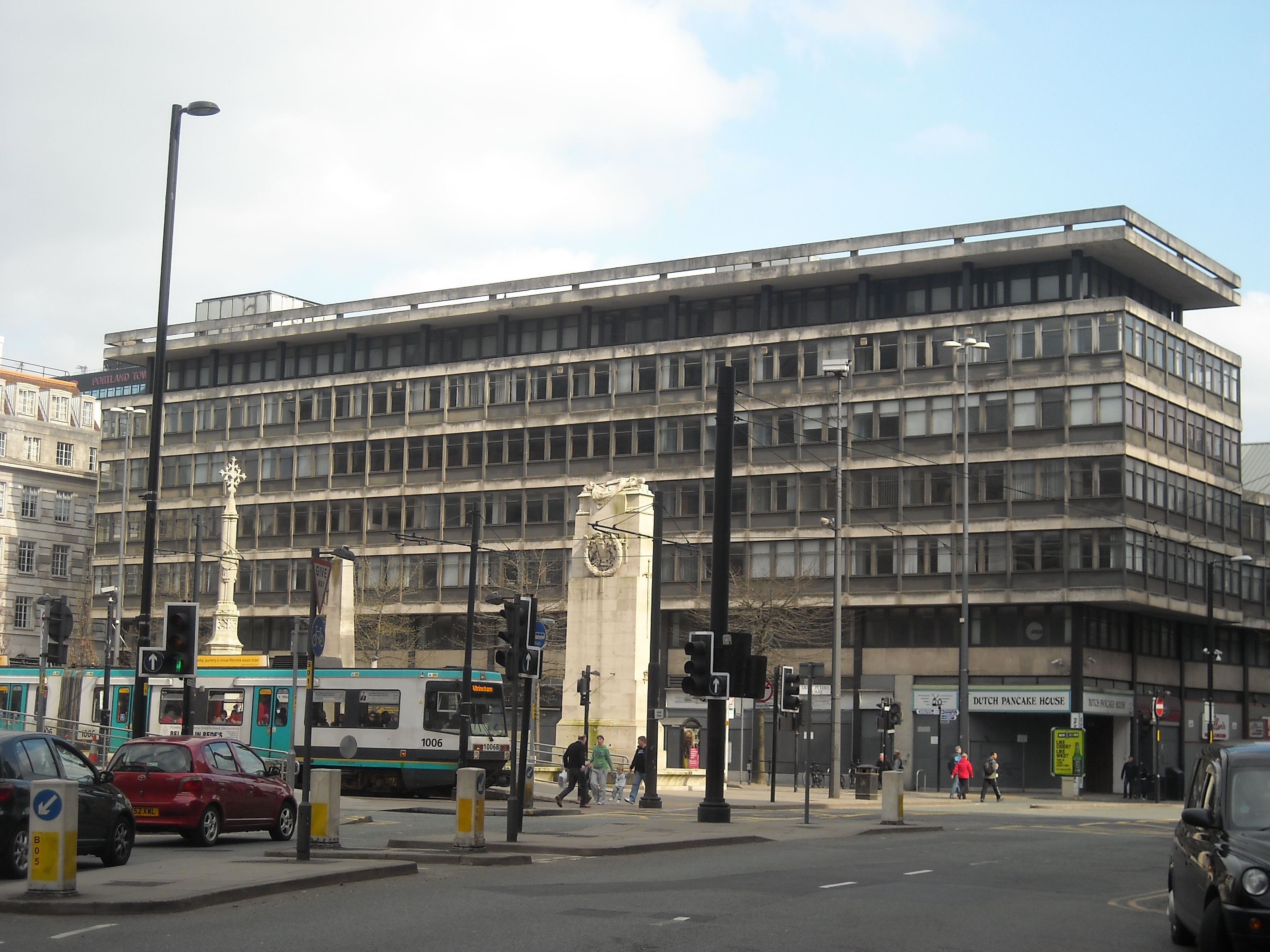
Elisabeth House (Cruickshank & Seward, 1971, demolished 2014)

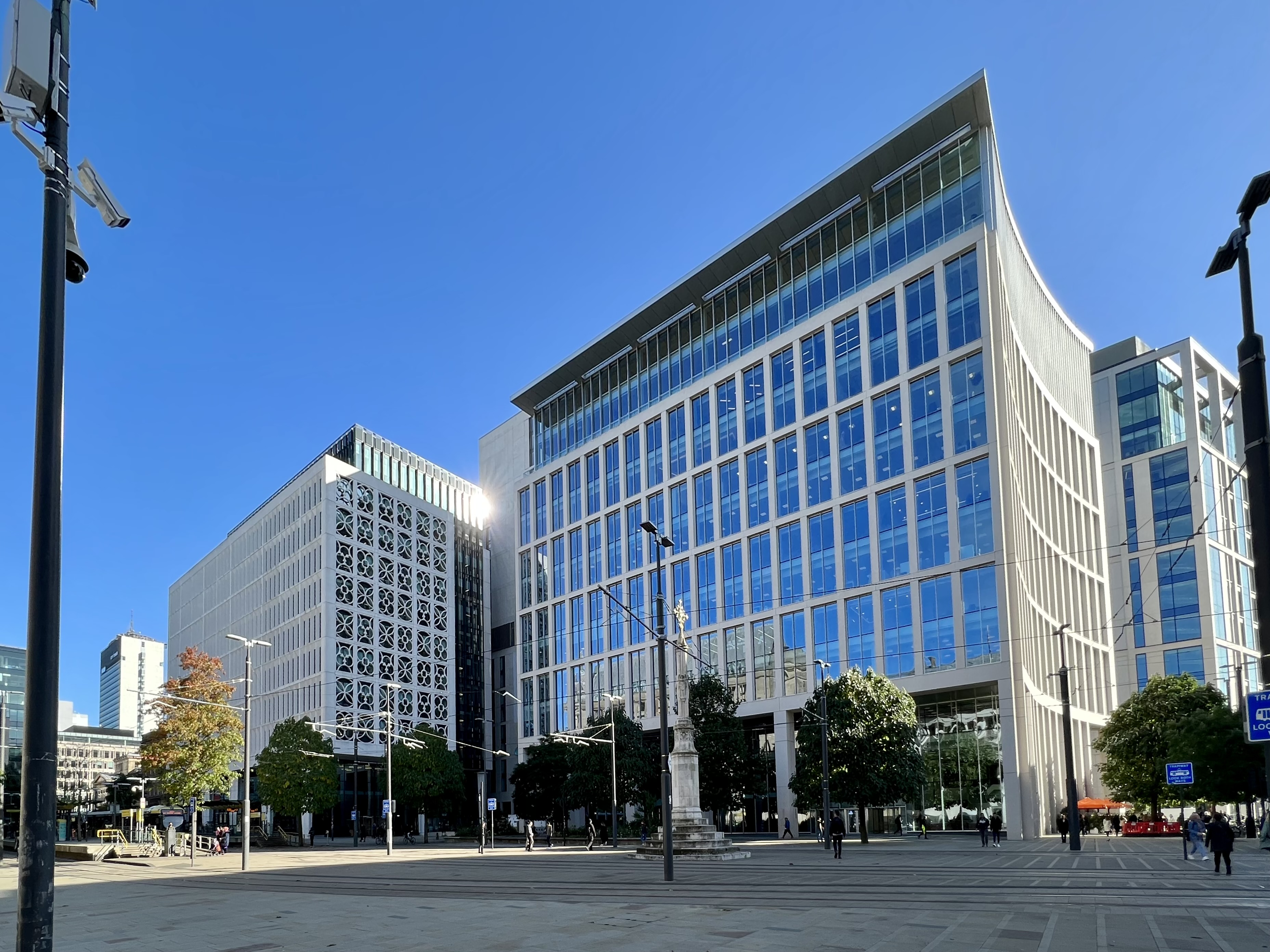
One St Peter's Square (Glenn Howells, 2014)

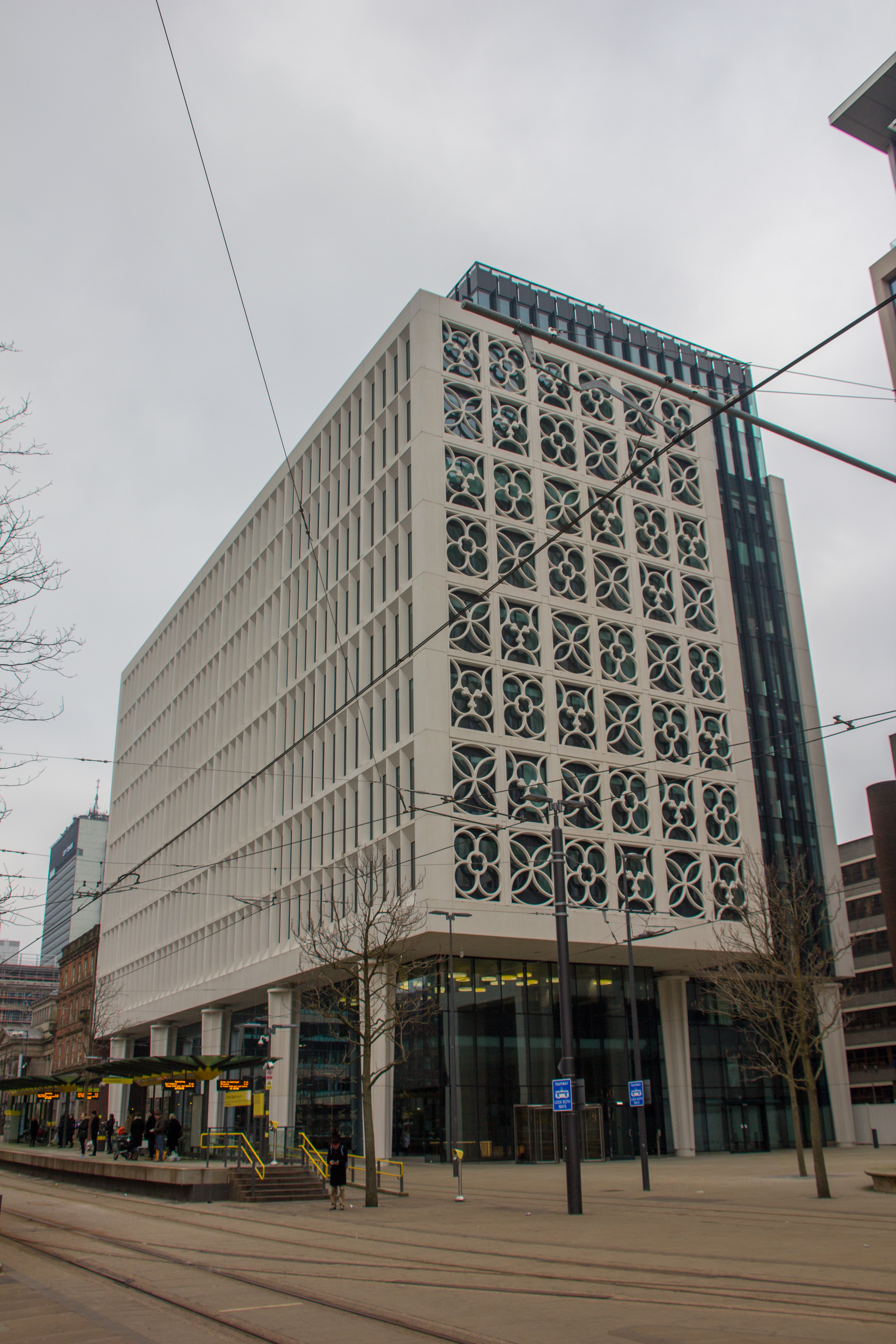
Two St Peter's Square (SimpsonHaugh, 2015)

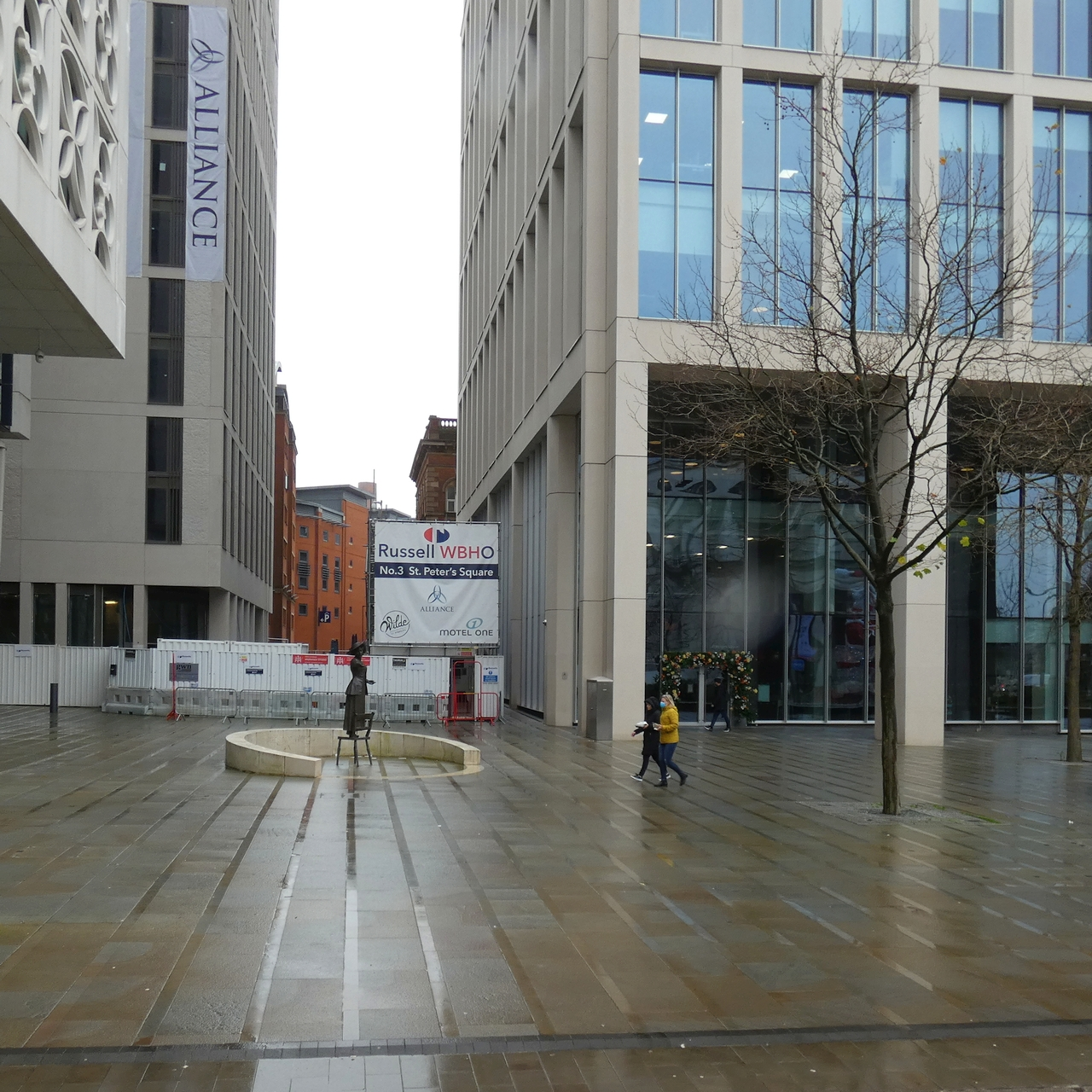
Three St Peter's Square

== Monuments and statues ==
Various monuments and works of public art have been installed in St Peter's Square over the years.

After the demolition of St Peter's Church in 1907, the site was marked by a Gothic-style Portland stone cross designed by Temple Moore, mounted on a hexagonal plinth and adorned with carved angels bearing the cross keys emblem of St Peter. Moore's design was subject to criticism at the time, as some expressed the view that a Renaissance style would be more fitting.

When the Peace Garden was laid out in the 1980s, a statue was commissioned from the sculptor Barbara Pearson, Messenger of Peace, consisting of a seated bronze female figure surrounded by doves. It was installed in the new garden in 1986; shortly afterwards, the doves were stolen and had to be replaced. When the garden was moved to Lincoln Square, it was decided not to retain the Messenger of Peace sculpture.

Manchester City Council held a competition for a second sculpture on the theme of peace, and a work by Philip Jackson was selected, Struggle for Peace and Freedom. The sculpture consisted of four male and female figures walking forwards, one with an outstretched arm. On the inscription on the granite pedestal, the sculptor's name was misspelled. At its unveiling in 1988, the work was dubbed "The Burghers of Manchester" (in reference to Auguste Rodin's 1889 sculpture The Burghers of Calais). Due to budget constraints, Jackson's sculpture was cast in cold-cure bronze. By 2004, it had weathered badly and had to be removed. Its whereabouts are not known.

John Cassidy's 1907 bronze sculpture, Adrift, depicts a family clinging to a raft in a stormy sea, with a central male figure holding a sheet aloft signaling distress. The statue once formed the centrepiece of the newly laid out Piccadilly Gardens. It was relocated in 1953 to the north side of the gardens to make way for a fountain commemorating the Coronation of Elizabeth II, and was then put into storage when the gardens were redeveloped in 2000. In 2009 it was installed in St Peter's Square outside the Central Library, and following the redevelopment of the square, it was relocated once again to its present location around the corner on Peter Street.

Rise up, Women, a statue of Emmeline Pankhurst, was unveiled on 14 December 2018 to commemorate 100 years since women were first allowed to vote in United Kingdom general elections.

Monuments and statues in St Peter's Square

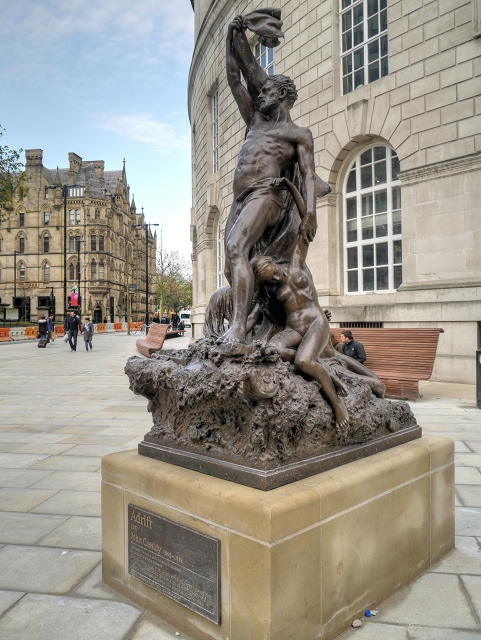
Adrift by John Cassidy (1907)

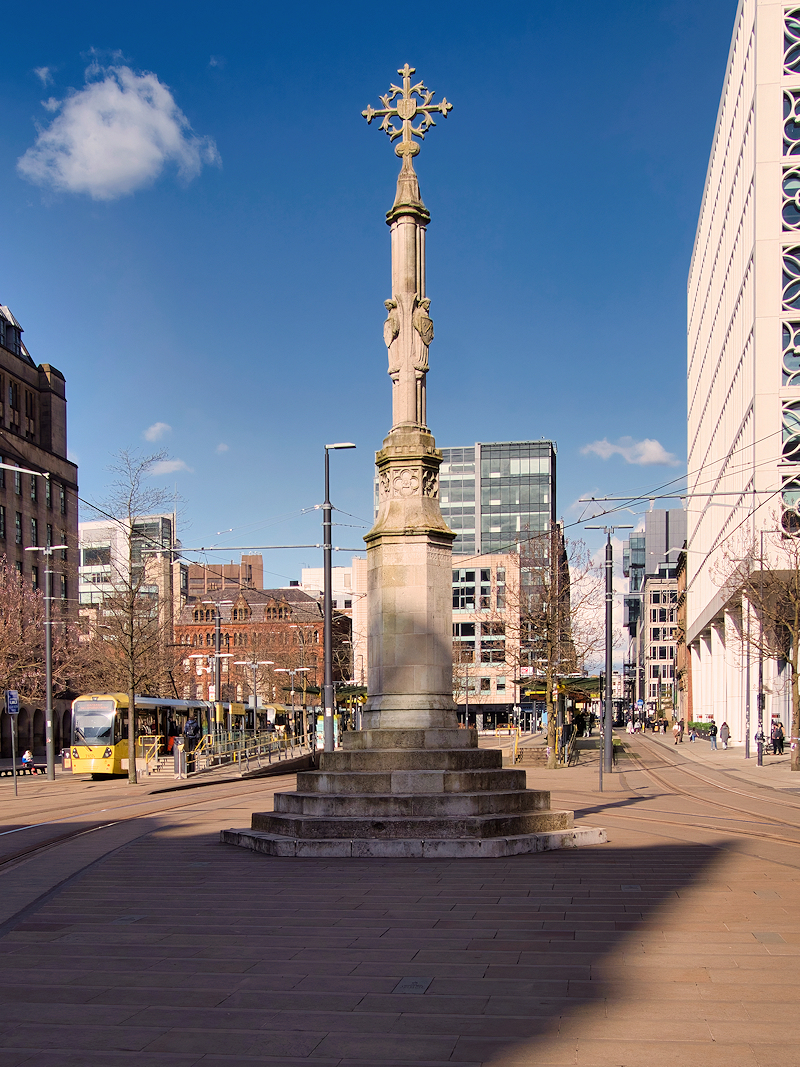
St Peter's Cross (1908)

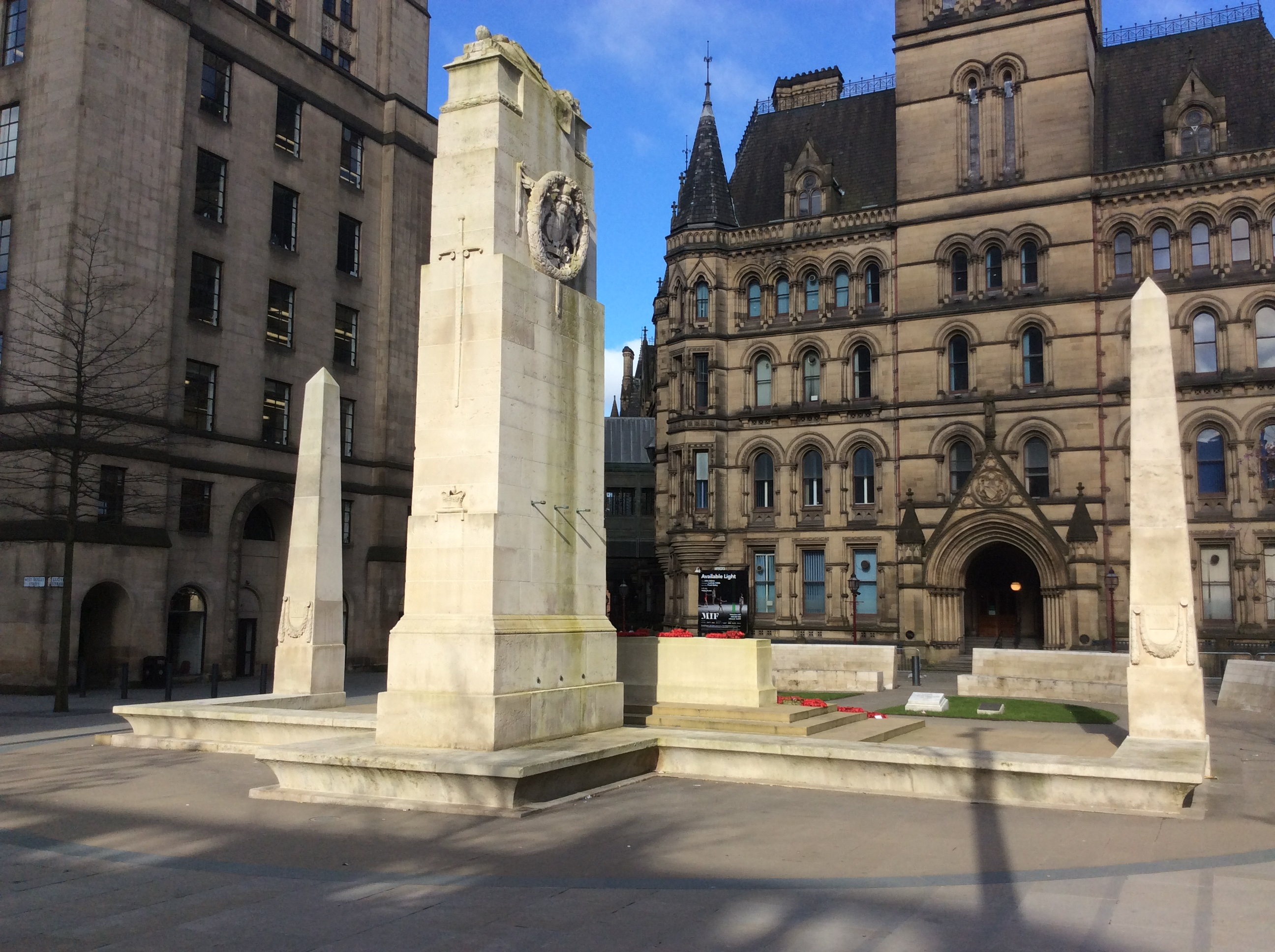
The Cenotaph by Edwin Lutyens (1924)

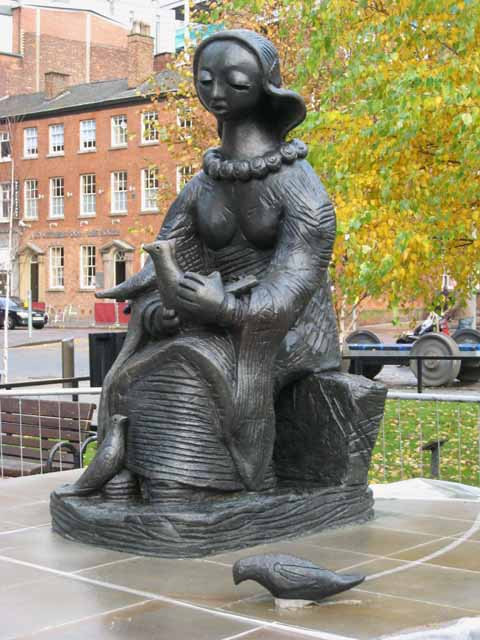
Messenger of Peace by Barbara Pearson (1986)

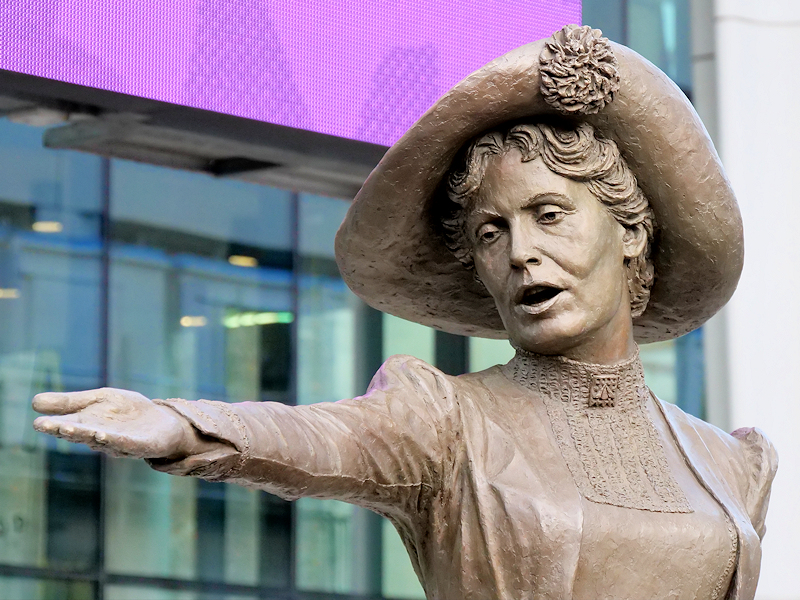
Rise up, Women by Hazel Reeves (2018)

=== Manchester Cenotaph ===
This is the work of Sir Edwin Lutyens and has similarities to the Cenotaph in Whitehall, London. It was inaugurated in 1924 and the ceremonies of Remembrance Day have been observed here annually since then. In 2014 the cenotaph was relocated to the north-east end of the square; opposite the Cooper Street entrance to the Town Hall.
