= Intercontinental Tower, Manchester =

Cancelled tower in Manchester, England

Coordinates: 53.4774°N 2.2466°W

Intercontinental Tower
- Artist's render of how the preferred design was to look when constructed
- Interactive map of the Intercontinental Tower area

General information
- Status: Proposed
- Type: Hotel and residential
- Location: Windmill Street, Manchester
- Construction started: Never started
- Cost: £80 million
- Operator: InterContinental Hotels Group

Height
- Antenna spire: 200 m (660 ft) max
- Roof: 160 m (520 ft) est.

Technical details
- Floor count: 30 to 48 storeys est.

Design and construction
- Architect: Stephenson Bell
- Developer: Benmore

Other information
- Number of rooms: 250

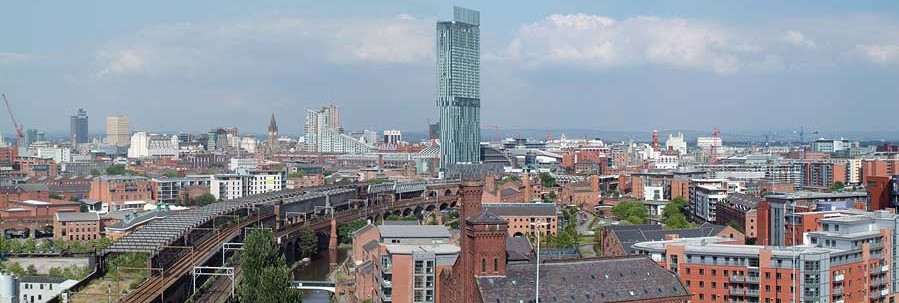
The Intercontinental Tower would have formed a coherent cluster with the Beetham Tower.

The Intercontinental Tower, Manchester is a cancelled landmark skyscraper that was proposed in Manchester city centre, England. The building would have been a five-star luxury hotel run by InterContinental Hotels Group, and developed by Northern Irish development firm, Benmore.

The skyscraper was proposed in a press release by developer Benmore in May 2009 and discussed with Manchester City Council in summer 2009. In 2010, the tower was part of the city council's preliminary plans to regenerate the surrounding civic quarter, and opposition to building a skyscraper in the heart of its historic district had been minimal.

The tower would have featured a helipad and two decorative spires, much like the Willis Tower in Chicago, which would have taken its pinnacle height to approximately 200 m (660 ft), 30 m taller than Greater Manchester's tallest skyscraper at the time, the Beetham Tower. The plans for the 48-storey tower were drawn up before the Great Recession but were abandoned when the financial market crashed. Planning negotiations resumed and architect Roger Stephenson designed a 25-storey tower to contain 270 hotel rooms and a presidential suite at the top. The theatre façade was to be retained to become the entrance to the hotel foyer. The structure was intended to be created behind the theatre's façade.

== Background ==
The skyscraper was proposed in May 2008 as the Theatre Royal Tower and the initial design was modified, with its height being increased from approximately 118 m (387 ft) to 200 m (660 ft).

Developers Benmore, who have invested in Manchester, revealed in a 2010 press release that they were in "advanced negotiations to bring an internationally renowned hotel chain to the city - the first of that brand in the North West". InterContinental Hotels Group were linked to the development. A factor in the proposal was that it would have been within the security cordon for Manchester Central Conference Centre which is a popular destination for business and political conferences.

The tower would have been close enough to the Beetham Tower to form a coherent cluster. Also planned was a helipad on top of the skyscraper which would have been the first of its kind in the United Kingdom.

In October 2009, the general manager of Manchester's Radisson Blu Edwardian Hotel believed the city had reached a 'tipping point' and would not see any major hotel investment for three years. Manchester City Council held a public consultation on the plans in February 2010. The Radisson Edwardian said they had "no objection to the re-instatement of the theatre here [Library Theatre] but object strongly to the proposal to redevelop the site for a 'tall' building which they define as any building exceeding 15 storeys". The council acknowledged that "a new quality hotel" was being planned but claimed, "The principle of a taller building on this site was established when planning permission was granted for a 17-storey office building on 2 June 2005. The impact on the historic environment (and in every other sense) of a scheme of this height was considered to be acceptable at that time. Therefore, officers do not consider that development at the Theatre Royal site should not exceed 15-storeys". Under the proposal, the skyscraper would have been built to the rear of the Theatre Royal, which would have been restored and its future preserved.

== See also ==
- Beetham Tower, Manchester
- List of tallest buildings and structures in Greater Manchester
