= Burmantofts Pottery =

Pottery and ceramics manufacturer

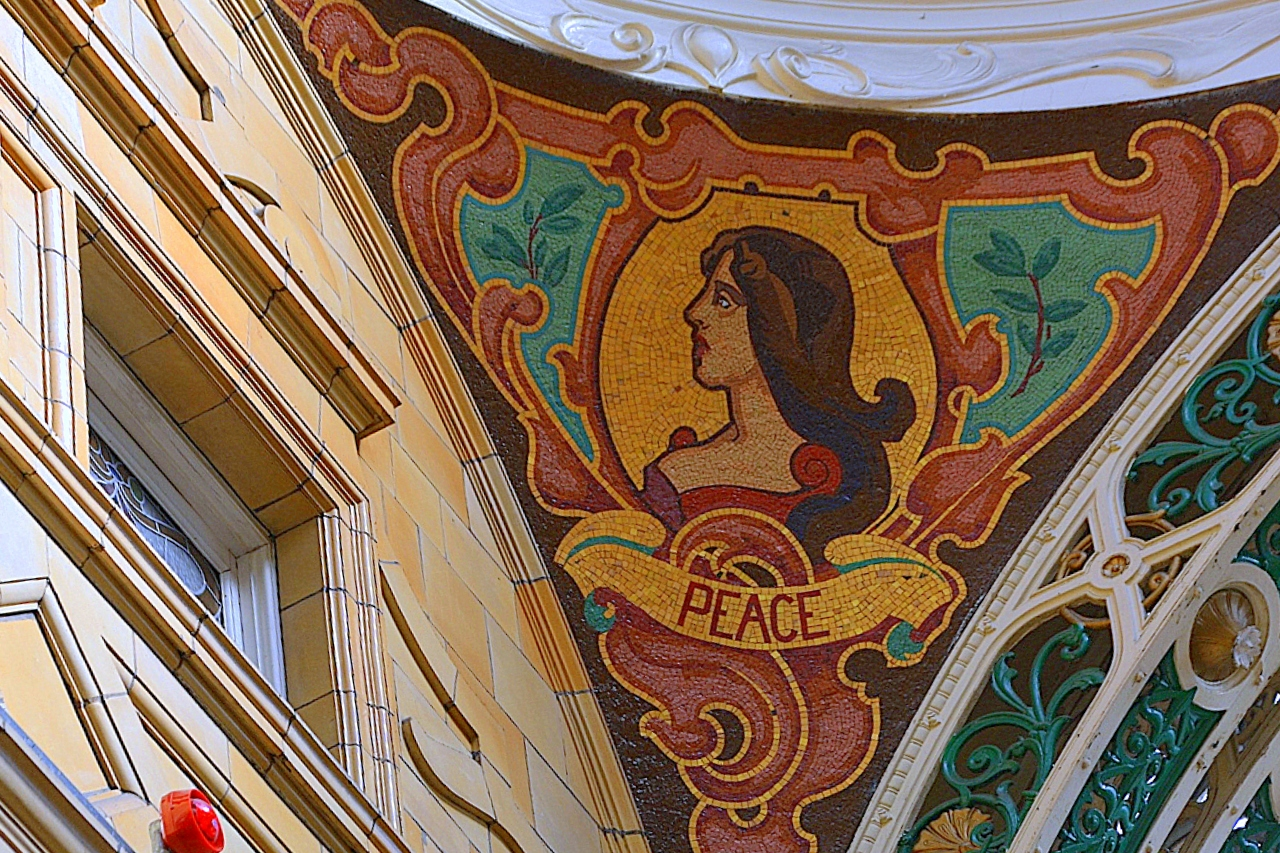
Burmantofts Vitreous Mosaic in County Arcade, Leeds

Burmantofts Pottery was the common trading name of a manufacturer of ceramic pipes and construction materials, named after the Burmantofts district of Leeds, England.

Following the example of Royal Doulton, having grown into a large company known for unglamorous utilitarian wares, the company expanded into decorated art pottery and decorative architectural ceramics such as tiles and glazed bricks. It closed in 1957, after cheaper foreign competition reduced profitability.

At various points the company was called: Wilcock & Co (1863), The Burmantofts Company (1888), Leeds Fireclay Co. Ltd. (1889).

== Company history ==
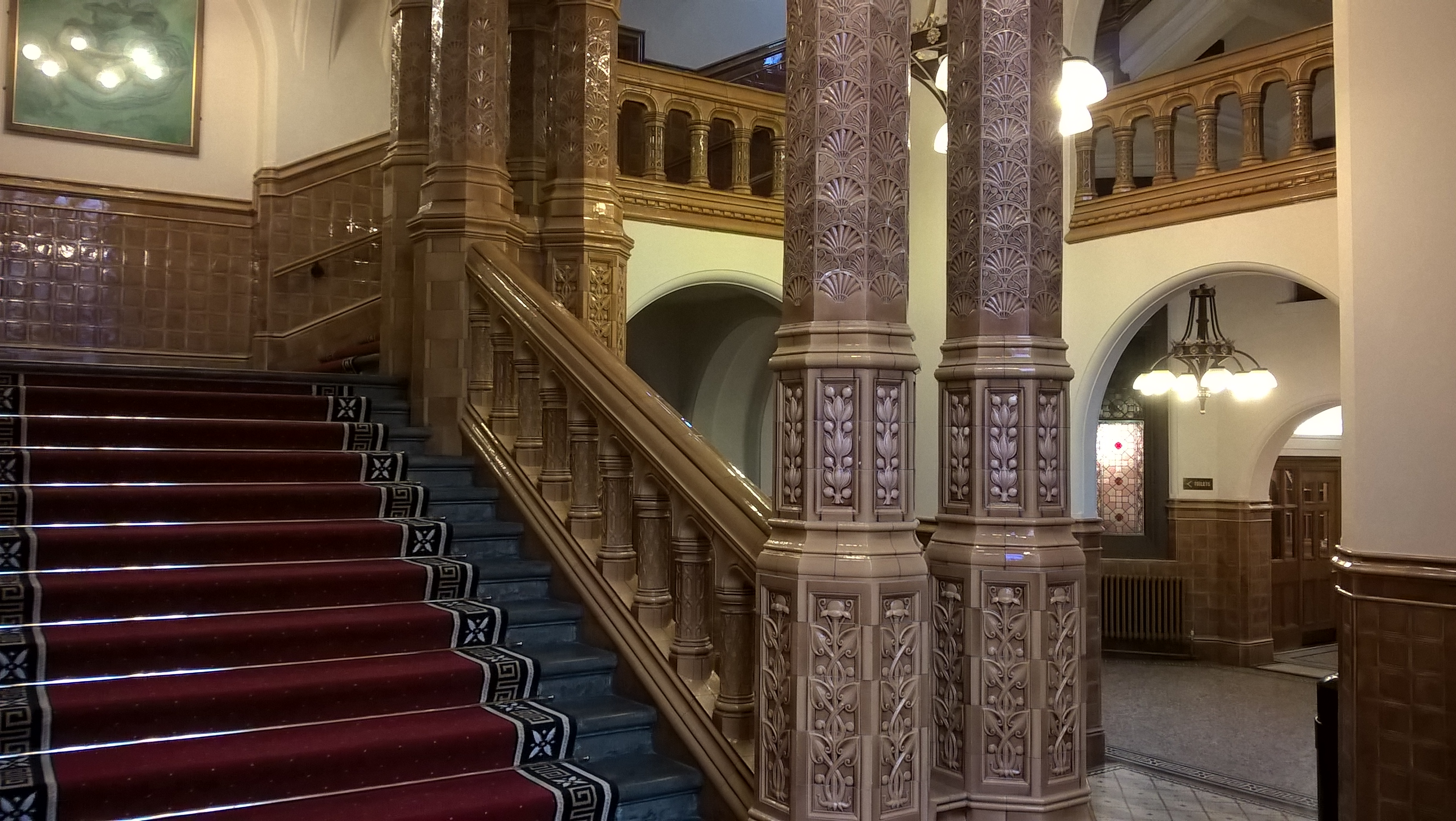
Burmantofts faience in the Great Hall of the University of Leeds

The business began in 1859 when fire clay was discovered in a coal mine owned by William Wilcock and John Lassey. In 1863 Lassey's share was bought by John Holroyd and the company then named Wilcock & Co.

In 1879, after a period of expansion, the firm made decorative bricks and tiles in orange or buff-coloured architectural terracotta, glazed bricks, and glazed terracotta. Architect Alfred Waterhouse used their materials in his Yorkshire College (1883) in Leeds, and his National Liberal Club (1884) in London. From 1880 they also made art pottery such as vases and decorative domestic items.

In 1888 the company was renamed The Burmantofts Company but in 1889 it merged with other Yorkshire companies to found The Leeds Fireclay Co. Ltd., the largest in the country.

The firm closed in 1957, at which time it comprised ninety kilns on 16 acres (65,000 m^{2}) of land.

== Burmantofts art pottery ==
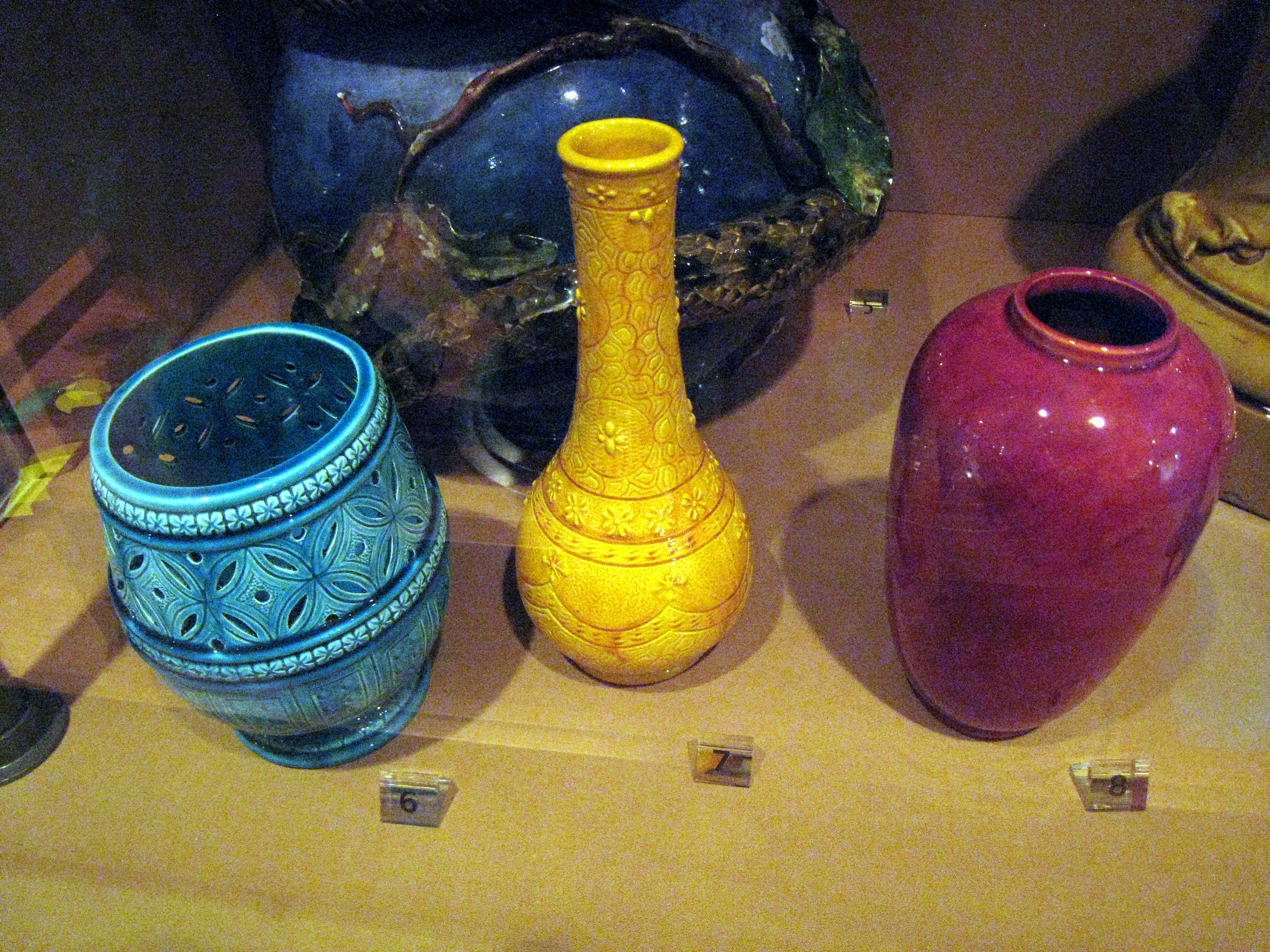
Single colour art pottery in Leeds Museum

This was produced between 1880 and 1904 at the instigation of James Holroyd, the works manager, as an addition to industrial glazed ceramic products. Companies such as Mintons, Royal Doulton and William De Morgan had established a market for middle-class home decorative objects. The company was fortunate in having both coal and four sorts of high-purity clay on the same site. The plasticity gave good reproduction of shape and the low iron content meant there was not discoloration by oxidation when fired at high temperature, giving glazes of high clarity and brilliance.

Early examples were individual works of art, notably in barbotine style where a plain base had a design worked in relief with slip and painted, but the company soon developed production lines for decoration of individual shapes, either in a single glaze or painted with flowers and so on (signed by the decorator), for sale at a lower price to a larger market, but still of high quality. Over 2000 different shapes are recorded, including pots, vases, bottles and table items. The base usually had 'Burmantofts Faience' or later 'BF' on the base, along with the shape number. Influences included Art Nouveau, Persian, Chinese and Japanese. French artist Pierre Mallet (who also designed for Minton's) contributed a number of designs. Decorative tiles were also produced.

In 1885 products were on sale in London (at Harrods and Liberty's), Paris and Montreal. However, by 1904 the products were no longer profitable because of a large number of competing products from Britain and nearby Europe of lower price, and production ceased.

== Burmantofts architectural faience ==
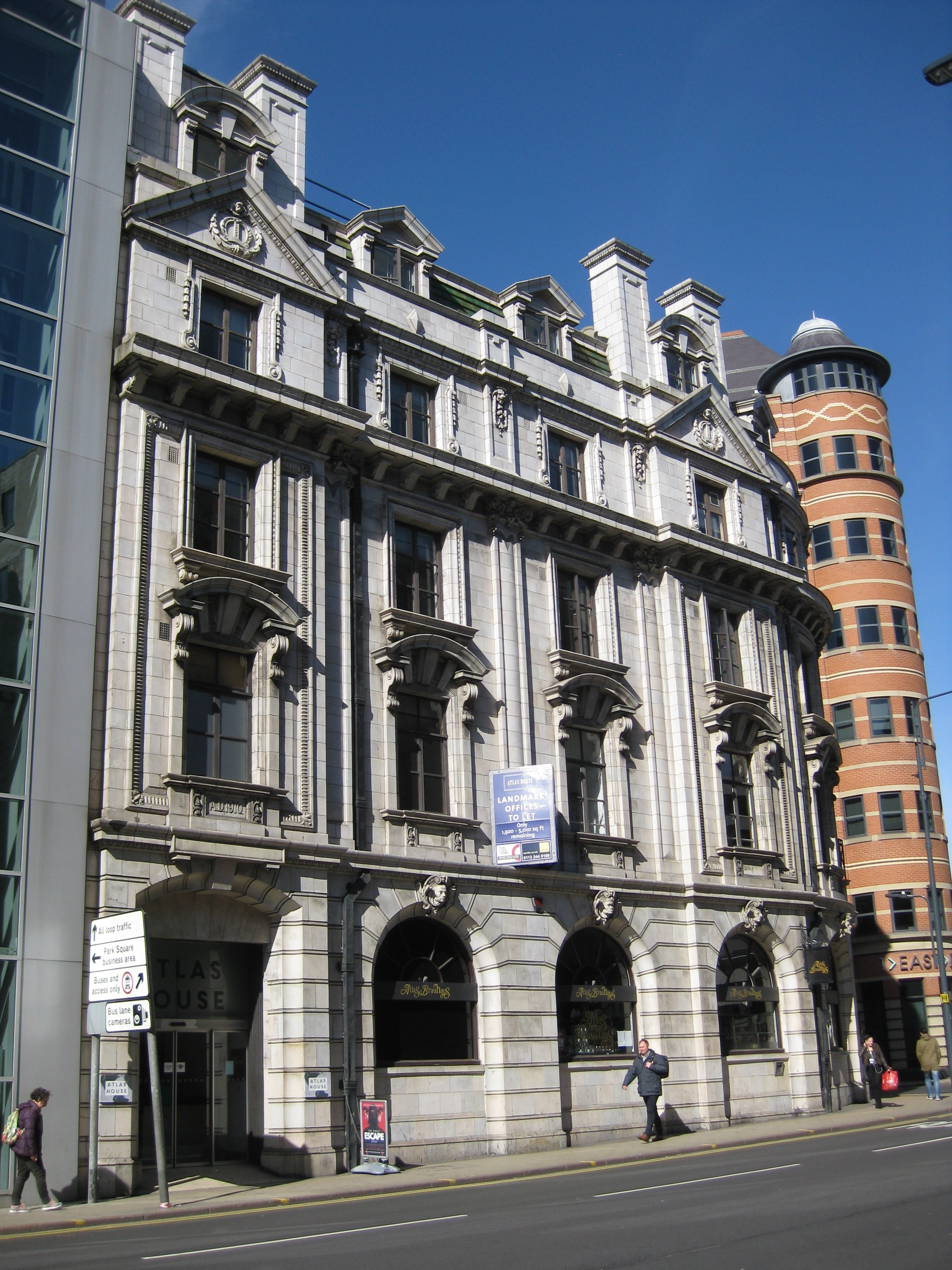
Atlas House, faced in Marmo

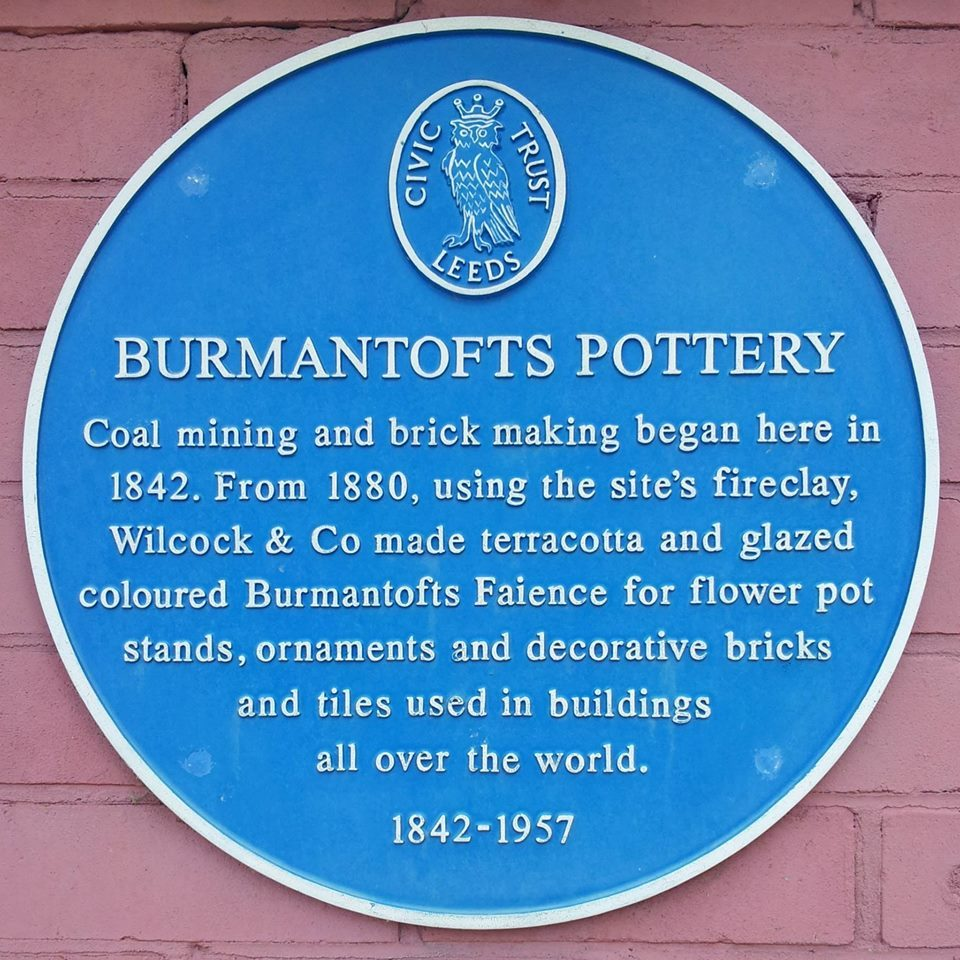
Burmantofts Pottery Blue Plaque

James Holroyd realised that a more decorative version of the company's salt-glazed bricks could be useful as an architectural facing material which could be washed from the grime of industrial cities and be more permanent than paint. This combination of artistic and business sense led to considerable success and material which is still in good condition more than a century later. He created a team of experts for the practical side and employed sculptor Edward Caldwell Spruce and architect Maurice Bingham Adams in designs. Simple coloured tiles or bricks were complemented by relief patterns, and a variety of glazes. However, the fashion for highly modelled surfaces passed and from 1904 the company concentrated on plain tiles used as facing, notably an artificial marble called Marmo, as used on Atlas House, King Street, Leeds and Michelin House, London, and Lefco which had a granite appearance and was also used for garden ornaments. These were in production until the company closed in 1957.

== Examples ==
- Atlas House, King Street, Leeds
- County Arcade, Leeds (Frank Matcham)
- Great Hall interior, University of Leeds, 1890–94, (Alfred Waterhouse)
- Shire Hall, Durham
- Centurion Bar, Newcastle Central Station
- Michelin House, South Kensington, London
- National Liberal Club, London
- London Road Fire Station, Manchester
- Midland Hotel, Manchester (Charles Trubshaw)
- Peveril of Peak, Manchester
