= Peter Street, Manchester =

Street in Manchester, England

Peter Street
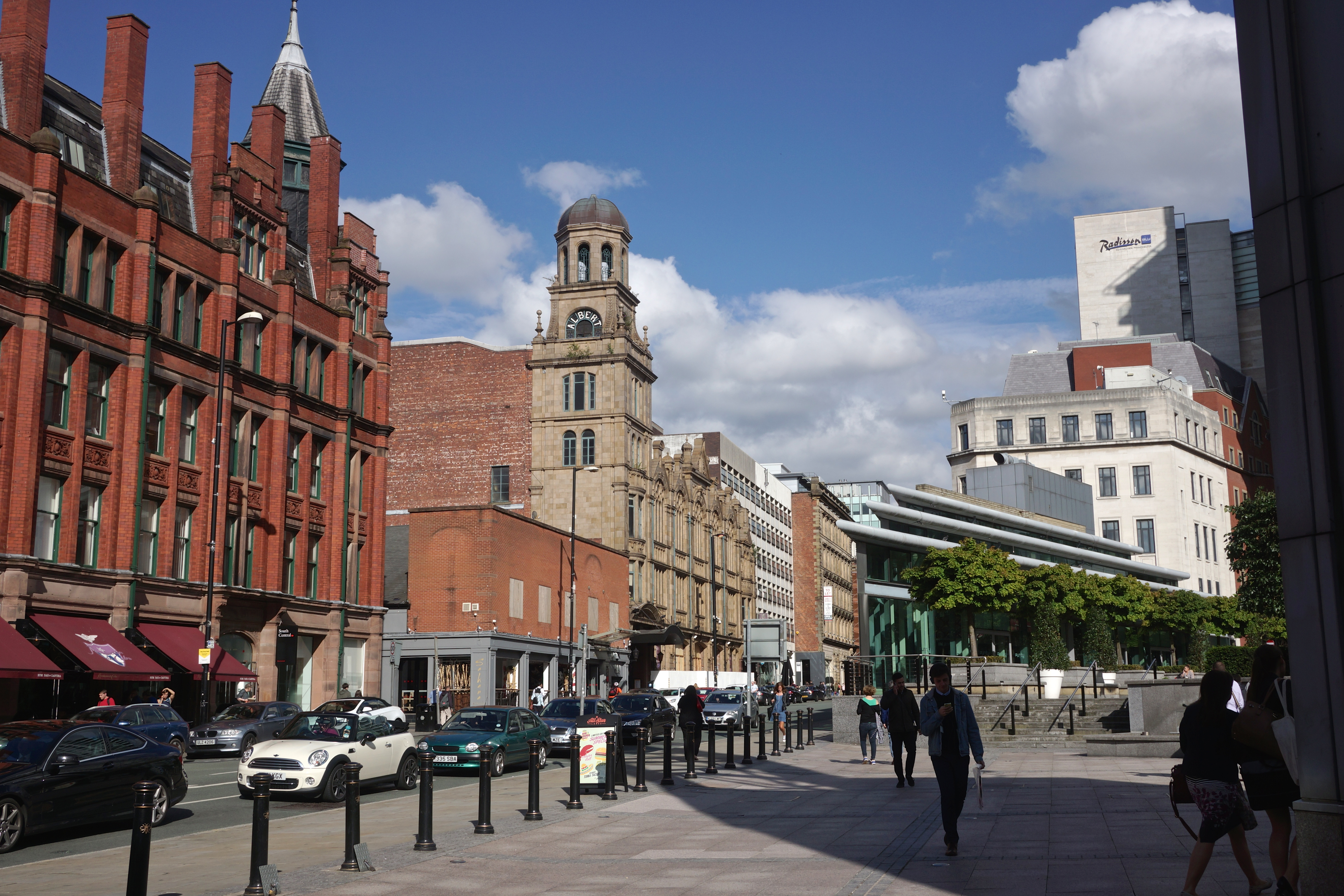
- Peter Street from Deansgate in 2015
- Interactive map of Peter Street
- Namesake: St Peter's Church
- Length: 300 m (980 ft)
- Location: Manchester, England
- Postal code: M2
- Coordinates: 53.4783°N 2.2475°W
- West end: Deansgate
- East end: St Peter's Square

Construction
- Completed: Late 18th century

Other
- Known for: Albert Hall, Free Trade Hall, Midland Hotel, Theatre Royal

Peter Street is a major thoroughfare in Manchester city centre, England, running east–west between St Peter's Square and Deansgate, and noted for its concentration of historic cultural and entertainment buildings. The street, designated the A34, continues east as Oxford Street and west as Quay Street. It forms part of the Deansgate/Peter Street conservation area and is lined with prominent venues including the Midland Hotel, the Free Trade Hall, the Theatre Royal, and the Albert Hall. The street developed from the late 18th century as Manchester expanded westwards, and today it remains a focal point for cultural, entertainment and commercial activity in the city centre.

== History ==
Peter Street was laid out in the late 18th century as part of Manchester's westward expansion, created when Quay Street was extended eastwards in 1794 to link the Irwell quay with Mosley Street. The new street took its name from St Peter's Church, then under construction on Mosley Street. Before this period the area formed part of Aldport Lane, a historic route running south from Deansgate through largely agricultural land until urban development accelerated in the 1730s. Part of the land south of the new street formed St Peter's Field, the site of the Peterloo Massacre of 1819; the present Free Trade Hall occupies a portion of this former open ground. The formation of Peter Street marked the transition of this section of the old manor lands into a planned urban thoroughfare, later complemented by the creation of St Peter's Square following the church's demolition in 1906.

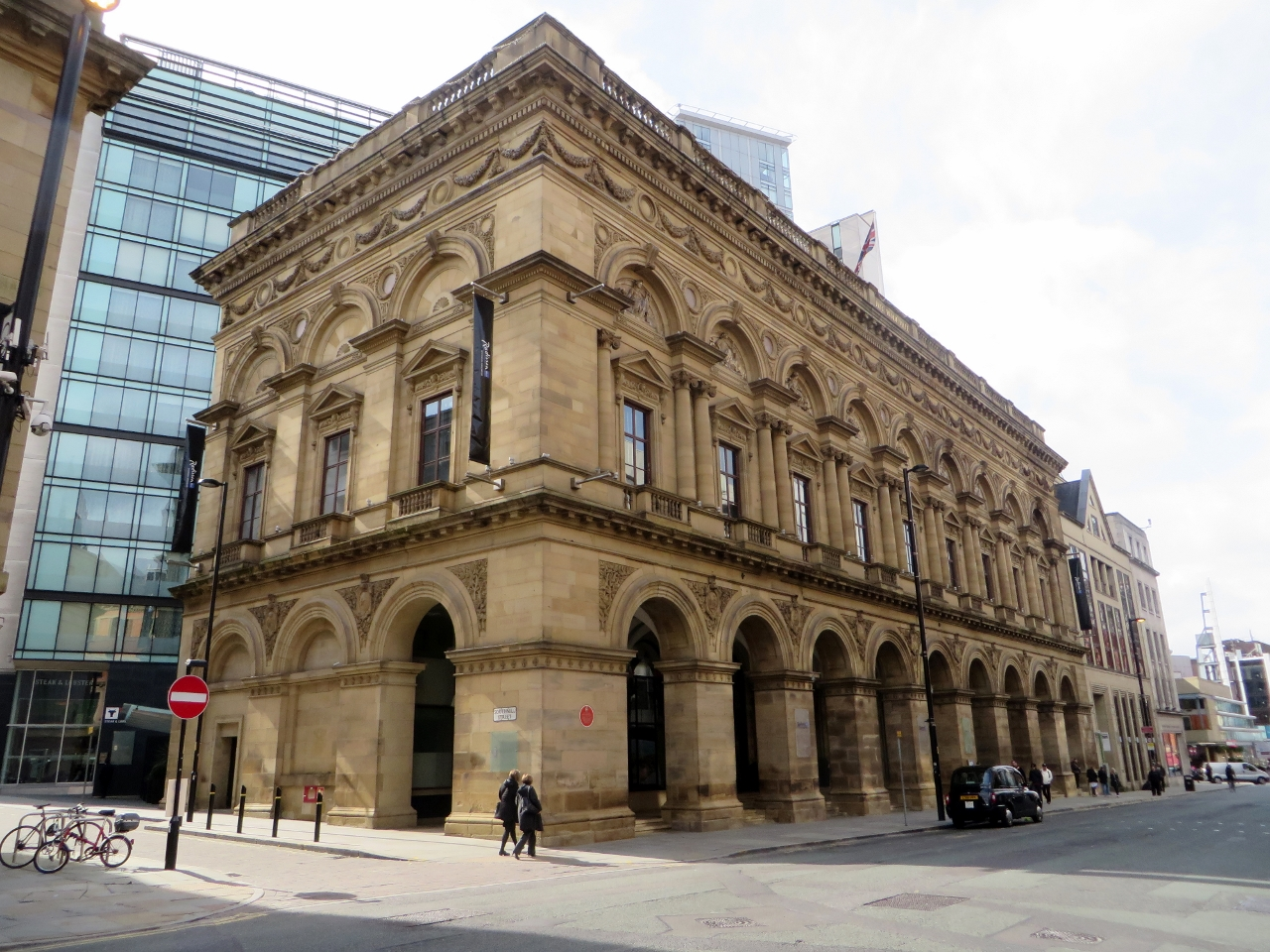
The Free Trade Hall on Peter Street in 2017

From 1835 to 1875 Peter Street housed the city's early natural history museum, whose collections later passed to Owens College and are recorded in British Museum catalogues as originating from the "Peter Street Museum"; the building was later demolished to make way for St George's House, completed in 1911, and the side street between it and the Theatre Royal is now called Museum Street.

Peter Street sustained bomb damage during the Manchester Blitz in December 1940, with the Free Trade Hall in particular suffering extensive destruction to its interior and roof.

In June 1985, Peter Street became part of the newly designated Deansgate/Peter Street conservation area, reflecting the concentration of historic civic and entertainment buildings along the route.

Public realm works in the 2010s associated with the redevelopment of St Peter's Square also altered the eastern end of the street, with widened footways, new paving and revised traffic arrangements.

== Architecture and layout ==
The street runs roughly east–west between St Peter's Square and Deansgate, forming part of a dense commercial and cultural district within the Deansgate/Peter Street conservation area. It contains several notable buildings, listed here from east to west: the Midland Hotel (Grade II*), an Edwardian Baroque hotel built for the Midland Railway; the Theatre Royal (Grade II), Manchester's oldest surviving theatre building; the Free Trade Hall, (Grade II*), rebuilt after wartime damage and long associated with the Hallé Orchestra; and the Albert Hall (Grade II), a former Wesleyan mission hall with a prominent terracotta façade that now operates as a live music venue. Other listed buildings on the street include Harvester House (No. 37), Lancashire House (No. 47), and St George's House (Nos. 56–58). At its western end Peter Street opens onto Great Northern Square, a public space situated in front of the Grade II*-listed Great Northern Warehouse. The surrounding blocks include additional places of assembly, together with offices and late‑Victorian and Edwardian commercial buildings that maintain a continuous street frontage and contribute to the area's established townscape.

Peter Street continues east as Oxford Street, which leads into the Oxford Road corridor, and west as Quay Street towards Salford, forming part of an east–west route across the southern side of the city centre.

== See also ==
- List of streets and roads in Manchester
