= Pierre Mallet =

French artist

Pierre Mallet (1836–1898) was a French artist known for painted designs on ceramic ware, who mainly worked in England.

== Life ==
Mallet was born in 1836 in at Jussey in Haute-Saône, France. He was trained in etching. He married and had two daughters, but was a widower by 1891. By 1873 he had moved to London, describing himself as a 'Painter on Porcelain' and working at Borgen and Co. in collaboration with Léonce Goutard. Both artists also produced work for Wedgwood and Mintons. From at least 1879 to 1877 he was a regular exhibitor at an annual exhibition and competition 'Painting on China' where reviews praised his imagination. The Pottery Gazette described some work as "...one of the finest specimens in the entire galleries. For depth of tone and colour, and delicacy of workmanship, it is one of the best specimens of china painting that we have ever seen." In about 1885 he moved to Leeds to work on Burmantofts Pottery, then in 1887 he moved to Brighton (though his designs continued to be produced in Leeds) and exhibited an etching at the Royal Academy, the first of many. He died in 1898, at Boulogne-sur-Seine.
