= Midland Hotel, Manchester =

Listed building in Manchester, England

Midland Hotel
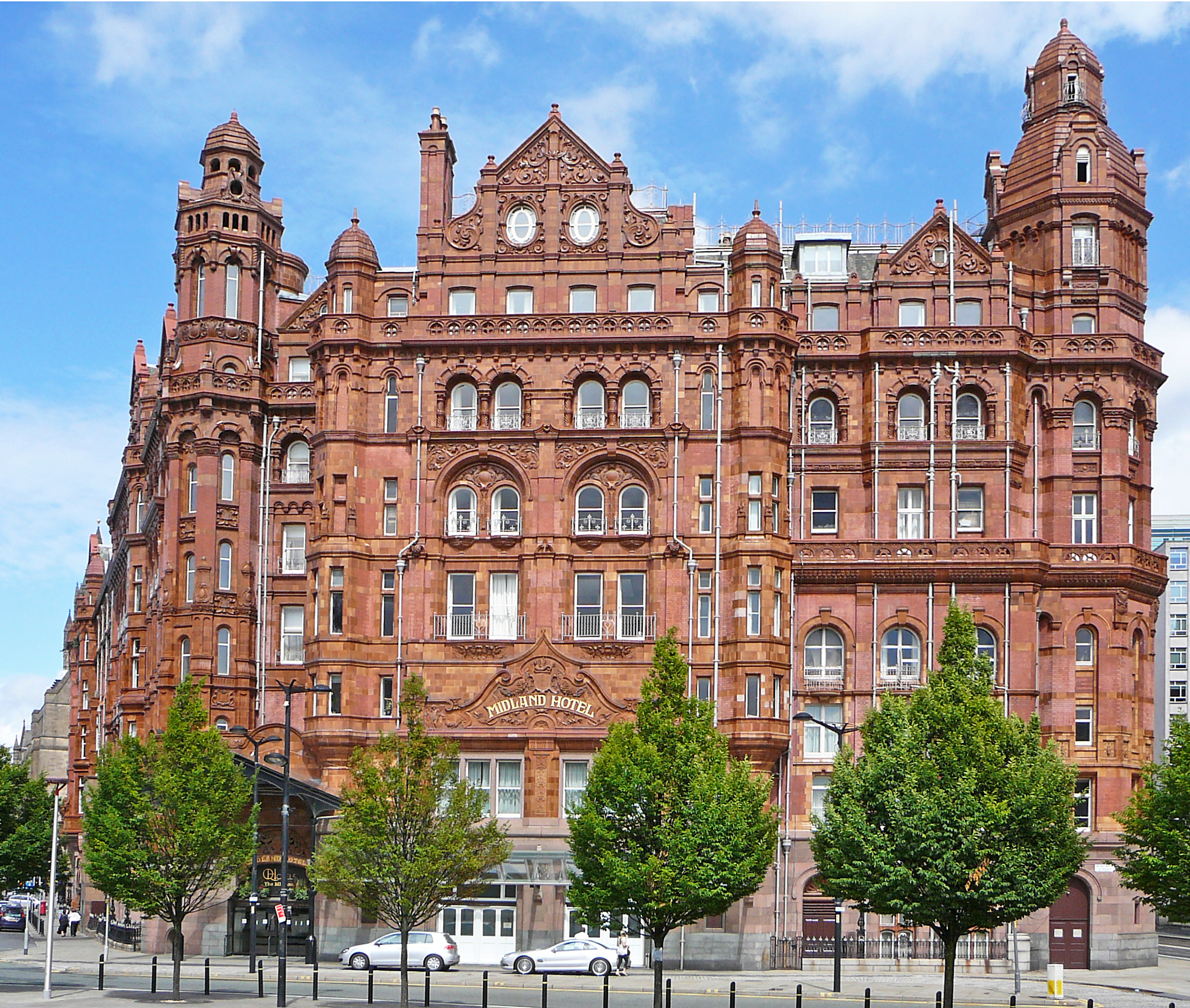
- West façade

General information
- Type: Hotel
- Architectural style: Eclectic Edwardian Baroque
- Location: 16 Peter Street, Manchester, M60 2DS, England
- Coordinates: 53.477222°N 2.245°W
- Construction started: 1898
- Opened: 5 September 1903
- Cost: £1 million in 1903 (£105 million in 2025)
- Client: Midland Railway Company

Technical details
- Structural system: Steel frame, red brick, brown terracotta, polished granite and Burmantoft terracotta

Design and construction
- Architect: Charles Trubshaw
- Designations

Listed Building – Grade II*
- Official name: Midland Hotel
- Designated: 3 October 1974
- Reference no.: 1271154

Website
- themidlandhotel.co.uk

The Midland Hotel is a grand hotel on Peter Street in Manchester, England. Opened in 1903, it was built by the Midland Railway to serve Manchester Central railway station, its northern terminus for its rail services to London St Pancras. It faces onto St Peter's Square. The hotel was designed by Charles Trubshaw in Edwardian Baroque style and is a Grade II* listed building.

== History ==
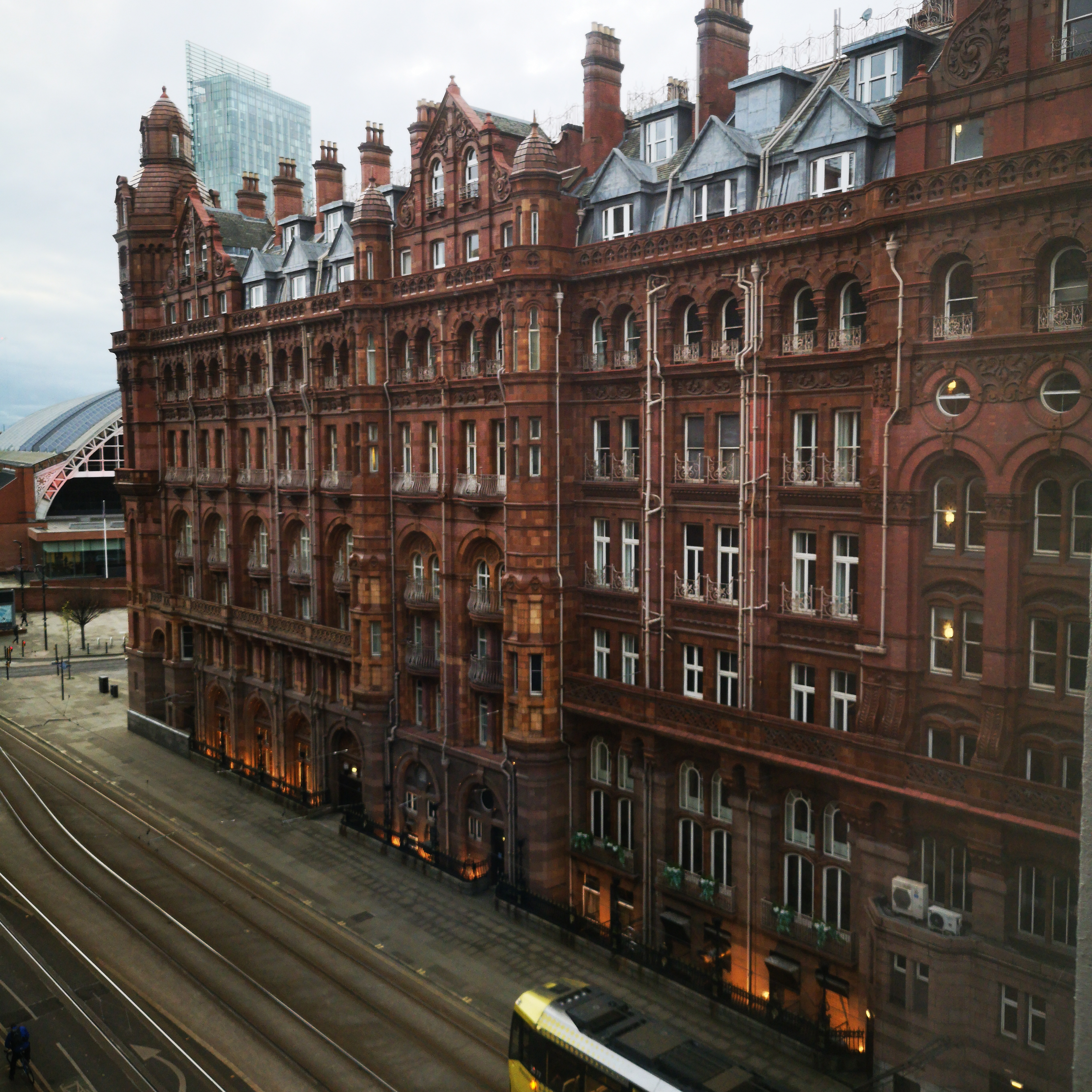
Side of the Midland Hotel

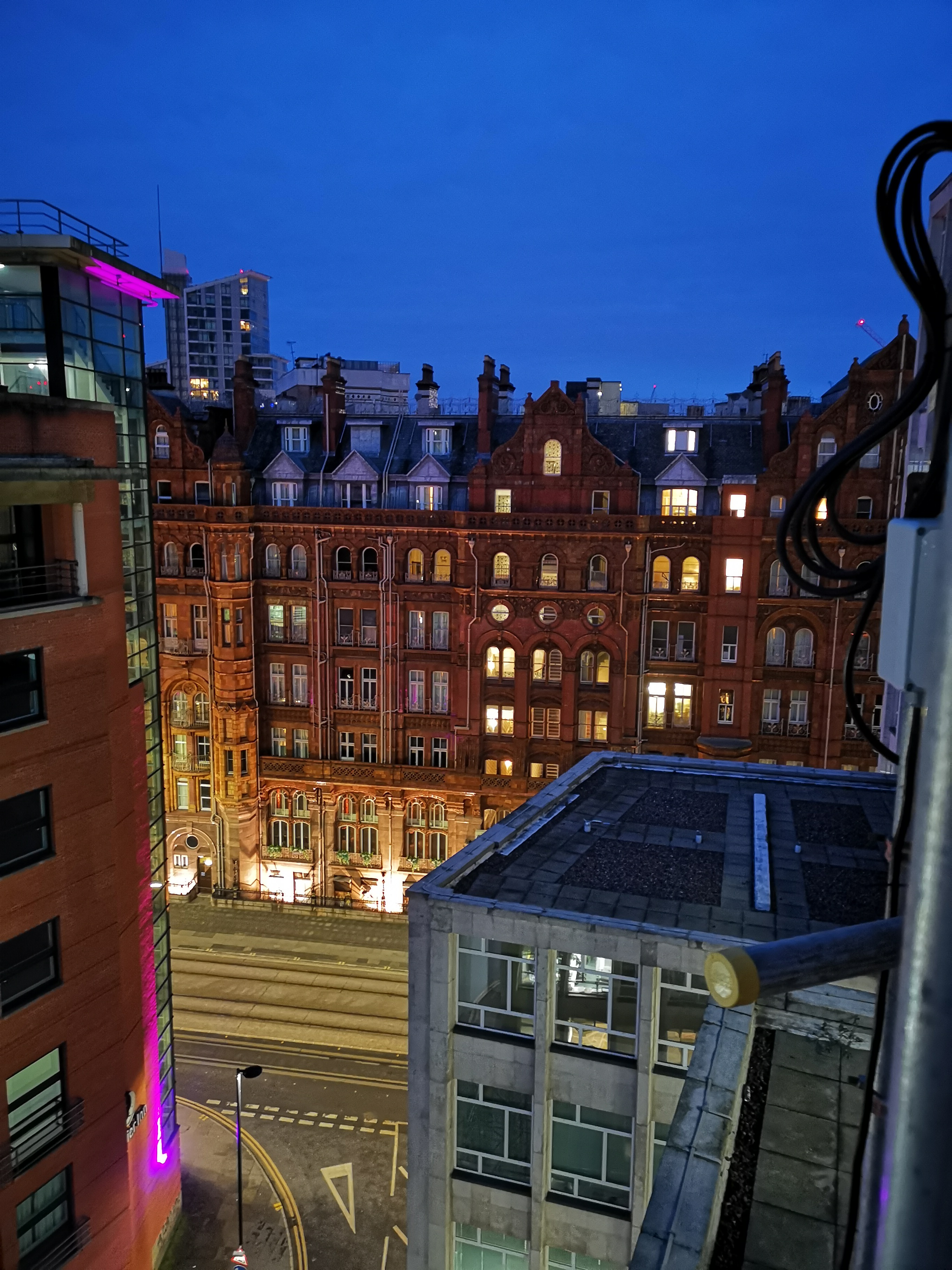
The Midland Hotel at night

Built at the junction of Peter Street and Lower Mosley Street opposite Manchester Central railway station, terminus for Midland Railway express trains to London St Pancras, the hotel was designed by Charles Trubshaw and constructed between 1898 and 1903 for the Midland Railway Company at a cost of more than £1 million (equivalent to £105 million in 2025). In 1908 The Railway News reported that the hotel had over 70,000 guests in its first year and described it as a "twentieth century palace". The hotel had a 1,000-seat purpose-built theatre where opera, drama and early Annie Horniman performances were staged, and a roof terrace where a string quartet performed.

The Midland Hotel was allegedly coveted by Adolf Hitler, who maintained a keen interest in architecture, as a possible Nazi headquarters in Britain. American intelligence speculated that the area of Manchester around the town hall was spared from bombing during the Second World War so as not to damage or destroy the Midland Hotel.

Charles Rolls met Henry Royce in the Midland Hotel, leading to the formation of Rolls-Royce Limited in 1904. The Queen Mother dined in the hotel's Trafford Restaurant in November 1959 after attending a Royal Variety Performance at the Palace Theatre. The Beatles were famously refused access to the French Restaurant for being "inappropriately dressed".

Once known as the Crowne Plaza Manchester – The Midland, it was bought by the Paramount Hotel Group (now the Hotel Collection) in 2004. It was upgraded in a £12 million renovation and was transferred to QHotels, formerly Quintessential Hotels, Paramount's sister company.

The hotel was sold in 2018 to a partnership of the Swedish firm Pandox and the Israeli firm Fattal Hotels. The new owners undertook a £14 million renovation. As of 2023, the Midland Hotel was operated by the Fattal Jurys Operation as a Leonardo Royal Hotel.

== Architecture ==
The Midland has a steel structure clad in red brick, brown terracotta and several varieties of polished granite and Burmantofts terracotta to withstand the polluted environment of Manchester. This includes some fine modelled panels by the sculptor Edward Caldwell Spruce. The building shares some similarity with other highly decorative Edwardian Baroque buildings in Manchester such as London Road Fire Station and Lancaster House. The building has been designated a Grade II* listed building by Historic England. The building was voted Greater Manchester's second-favourite building by readers of the Manchester Evening News in 2012.

== Hotel ==
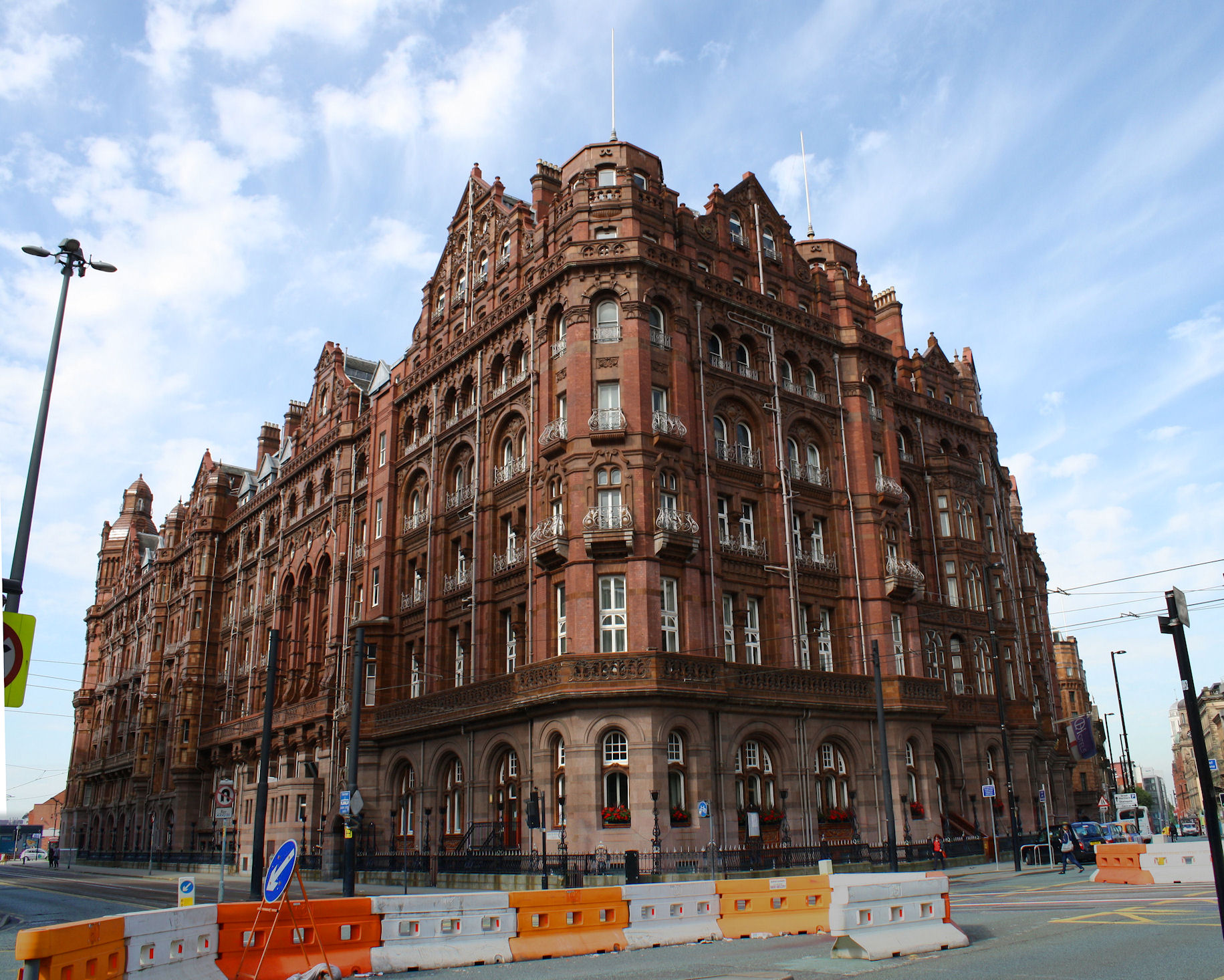
Midland Hotel, from the junction of Oxford Street and St Peter's Square

The hotel is close to Manchester Central exhibition and conference centre on the site of the former railway station, the Bridgewater Hall and Manchester Central Library. The hotel has 312 en-suite bedrooms and 14 suites, a health club and two restaurants – Adam Reid at The French and Mount Street Dining Room & Bar.

=== Restaurants ===
The French, once described by The Good Food Guide as "Manchester's finest dining room", was one of Britain's first Michelin-starred restaurants – awarded in 1974 in the first guide. It re-opened in March 2013 and chef Simon Rogan who stated his desire was to re-establish it to its former opulence and was rated the 12th best restaurant nationally in its first year of opening and awarded the best New Entry award by The Good Food Guide. The French was awarded three Rosettes – the maximum permitted in the first year of opening.

The Colony was named after the cotton traders who sold raw cotton to mill owners and referred to themselves as the Old Colony Club. It closed for refurbishment in 2013 and re-opened in the September as Mr. Cooper's House & Garden in tribute to Thomas Cooper, whose house and gardens occupied the hotel site in 1819. The family were coach-makers and their garden was famous for its strawberries, gooseberries, apples and flowers.

Following a complete makeover, the restaurant is now called Mount Street Dining Room & Bar.

== See also ==
- Grade II* listed buildings in Greater Manchester
- Listed buildings in Manchester-M60
