= Quay Bar =

Former building in Castlefield, Manchester, England

Coordinates: 53.4737°N 2.2535°W

Quay Bar was a building situated next to the Bridgewater Canal basin in Castlefield, Manchester, England. It was designed by architects Stephenson Bell (now stephenson hamilton risley STUDIO) for their client Wolverhampton & Dudley Brewery (better known as Banks).

Shortly after completion in 1998, the building won a number of awards, including an MSA Design Award, RIBA Award and the Manchester Civic Society Award. It was also shortlisted for the prestigious Stirling Prize.

With competing bars and restaurants opening closer to the city centre, particularly the popular Deansgate Locks, Quay Bar faced difficulties in attracting the same crowds it achieved when it first opened. The bar closed in 2003.

It was bought by Urban Splash who rebranded it as the rather short-lived Modo Clubroom, and was subsequently let out on an occasional basis to military themed bar operator Canteena.

The building became vacant in 2005, subsequently falling into disrepair. During 2006–07, it became notorious for its use by drug addicts, suffering a number of arson attacks and prompting calls for its demolition.

In November 2007, the building was demolished, due to its dilapidation and frequent vandalism.
