= Theatre Royal, Manchester =

Historic theatre in Manchester, England

Theatre Royal
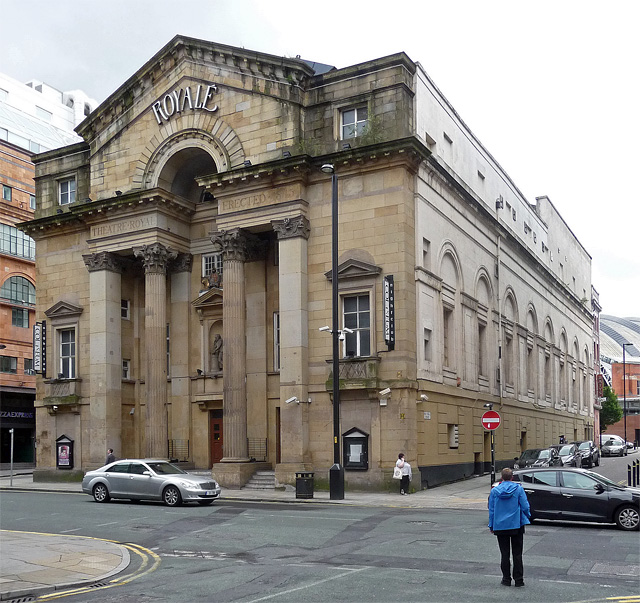
- Theatre Royal front façade
- Address: Peter Street, Manchester, England
- Coordinates: 53.4777°N 2.2465°W
- Owner: Edwardian London
- Type: Victorian variety theatre

Construction
- Opened: 1845
- Reopened: 1875, 1921, 1963, 1972, 1990
- Years active: 1845–1921 (as a theatre)
- Architects: John Gould Irwin & Francis Chester (1845); Edward Salomon (1871 alteration)

Listed Building – Grade II
- Official name: Royale Club
- Designated: 3 October 1974
- Reference no.: 1246667

The Theatre Royal on Peter Street in Manchester, England, opened in 1845. Situated next to the Free Trade Hall, it is the oldest surviving theatre in Manchester. It was commissioned by Mancunian businessman John Knowles who wanted a theatre venue in the city, and it is the oldest theatre building in Manchester city centre.

The Theatre Royal operated as a theatre from 1845 until 1921, when it closed in the face of growing competition from the Palace Theatre and Opera House. The building has since been converted numerous times for use as a cinema, bingo hall and nightclub. It has been unoccupied since 2011, with the nightclub hosting its last night on 31 December 2010.

In 2012, the building was purchased by Edwardian Hotels, owner of the neighbouring Radisson Edwardian. Edwardian Hotels have no intention of re-developing the Grade II listed building and it was placed on the Theatres Trust's "At Risk" register in 2013. Recent infractions include an order in 2019 for making alterations without listed consent and in 2024 for leaks into the interior.

== Architecture ==
The theatre, which stands on an island site on the south side of Peter Street, is constructed in sandstone ashlar. It has two storeys, with an attic, and was built in the neoclassical style. Around the building, between the upper storey and the attic, is a modillioned cornice. Its entrance front facing Peter Street is symmetrical with three bays, the central bay being wider than the lateral bays. The central bay is in the form of a portico, with Corinthian columns and pilasters. Its entablature contains a central semicircular arch breaking through to the gable. Steps lead up to entrances in each bay. Above the central entrance is a pedimented niche containing a statue of William Shakespeare, which is based on the statue by Peter Scheemakers in Westminster Abbey. The lateral bays contain windows with balconies on the upper storey. Along the sides of the theatre are alternating rectangular windows and panels, with a blank semicircular arch above each window. The interior of the theatre has been altered, but retains its 1875 gallery. The theatre was designated as a Grade II listed building on 3 October 1974. The authors of the Buildings of England series describe it as a "splendid classical composition in stone, one of the best examples of theatre architecture surviving anywhere in England from the first half of the 19th century". The Theatres Trust described it as "unique and architecturally significant", with the façade being "one of the finest examples of theatre architecture to have survived in Britain from the first half of the nineteenth century", stating that it influenced the design of the Royal Opera House, London.

== Use as a theatre ==
Manchester appears to have two previous Theatres Royal before the current building was constructed in 1845. The first opened in Spring Gardens on 5 June 1775 having been approved by the Manchester Theatre Act 1775 (15 Geo. 3. c. 47). It operated on that site until the expiration of the proprietors' lease in 1807.

The second Theatre Royal opened in Fountain Street on 12 July 1807 and was destroyed by fire on 7 March 1844. John Knowles took over the management of this second Theatre Royal some time before the fire, at a time when the theatre in Manchester was at its lowest ebb. Knowles set up a strong stock company and proved himself a very capable, though somewhat authoritarian, theatre manager. However, following the 1844 fire the proprietors of the theatre on Fountain Street refused to rebuild it.

At a public dinner in his honour in July 1844, Knowles was presented a plate "in acknowledgement of his energetic and successful efforts to revive national drama in Manchester". Knowles told the gathering that if they could get no one else to build a theatre then he would do it himself. As a result, Knowles bought the patent rights and set about finding a site for the new theatre. Knowles had always been an admirer of theatrical performances and he was anxious to see their renovation in this, his native town. He desired to see the revival of the legitimate drama, and the plays represented in a manner duly worthy of them.

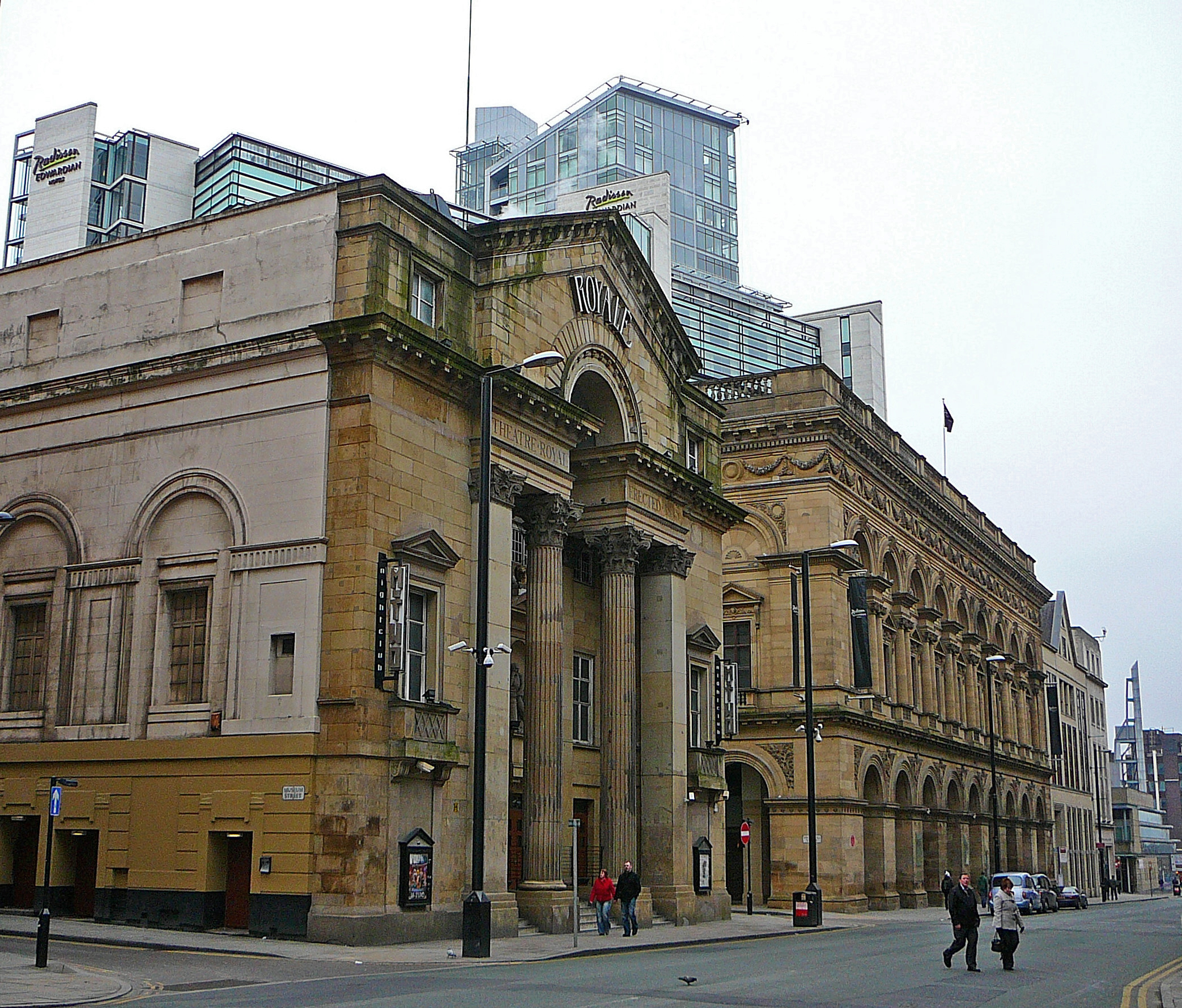
Theatre Royal front façade on the left with the Free Trade Hall.

Knowles found a new site for his theatre on Peter Street. He demolished the Wellington Inn and Brogden's Horse Bazaar. Knowles employed Francis Chester and John Gould Irwin as the architects for his new theatre. In preparation for the building of the new Theatre Royal, Knowles and Chester went to London and visited most of the metropolitan theatres, noting their areas, internal forms, acoustic capabilities, etc. With a cost of £23,000, the new Theatre Royal opened to an audience of 2,500. Precautionary measures against fire were taken by placing a tank on the roof capable of holding 20,000 gallons of water, which was connected by pipes to the stage and the green room. Its programme that night included Weber's Oberon overture, Douglas Jerrold's "Time works wonders" and an elaborate ballet spectacle "The Court Ball in 1740". Knowles's schedule of productions was intensive – in one season there were 157 performances at which two and sometimes three plays were performed. The popularity of the theatre grew. Charles Dickens, John Leech and George Cruikshank were amongst notable people who appeared at the theatre. The theatre was dedicated to Shakespeare and Knowles installed a Carrara marble statue of the playwright above the entrance. It was Manchester's finest outdoor statue. In 1875, after years of success, Knowles severed his connections with the theatre, disposing of it to a limited company for £50,000.

== Later use ==
In 1921 the theatre was converted to a cinema due to competition from the Palace Theatre and the Opera House. In 1972 the theatre became a bingo hall, then a nightclub in 1978, at which point various lighting bridges and rigs were added. It was known successively as the "Discotheque Royale", "Infinity" (from August 2000) then "M2" and finally a rename and rebrand to "Coliseum". The nightclub closed in 2011.

In 2008 a 118 m (387 ft), 28-storey tall office and retail tower was proposed, called "Theatre Royal Tower", that would be connected to the back of the original theatre. It was designed by Stephenson Bell with The Benmore Group as the developer.

It was announced in 2011 by owners Benmore that the Theatre Royal would receive a £2 million refurbishment to convert the building into a live music venue. Plans to convert the building into a hotel and live music venue never came about.

Despite the promise of investment, Benmore sold the building in November 2012. It was purchased by Edwardian Hotels, who owned the Radisson Blu Edwardian hotel adjacent to the theatre in the Free Trade Hall. It was initially thought that the building could potentially be restored as a theatre or banqueting hall as a complementary extension for the hotel. but As of September 2025 the building remains unused.

The 1845 exterior façade is virtually intact, and the building retains the balcony from 1875. Theatres Trust has said that the internal conversions for its past usage in various guises appear to have obscured – rather than destroyed – the interior. The Trust classify the original interior work as "restorable as a theatre".

== See also ==
- Listed buildings in Manchester-M2
