= Chorlton Park Apartments =

Apartment building in Manchester, England

Coordinates: 53.4344°N 2.2729°W

- Interactive map of the Chorlton Park Apartments area

General information
- Architectural style: Modernist
- Location: Chorlton, Manchester, England
- Completed: April 2002
- Client: Irwell Valley

Design and construction
- Architect: Roger Stephenson
- Structural engineer: Whitby Bird

The Chorlton Park Apartments is a green apartment building in Chorlton, Manchester, England. It was designed by architect Roger Stephenson and built as part of collaboration between Tom Bloxham's development company Urban Splash and Irwell Valley in 2002.

The development won a number of awards including the Housing Design Award in 2001, Roses Design Awards - best residential project in 2002 and in 2003 won the MSA Design Award in the residential section. Its most prestigious award came in 2004 when it was awarded the Royal Institute of British Architects RIBA Award.

Stephenson liked the design so much that he bought a top floor apartment for himself.

== Background ==
The site was formerly a contaminated petrol filling station at 417 Barlow Moor Road, an arterial route connecting Cheshire to Manchester city centre via the suburb of Chorlton-cum-Hardy.

The site was acquired by the Irwell Valley company in the late 1990s. The company, concerned it was acquiring the image of a "worthy-but-dull" organisation, instigated a limited invited architectural competition in 1999 to design a scheme for approximately 20 homes on the site and invited four high-profile architects including Stephenson Bell (now Stephenson:ISA Studio), MBLC and Sterling Award winners Ian Simpson and Stephen Hodder to compete for the instruction.

Each submission was submitted anonymously and the design brief was to provide "space, light and warmth, flexibility, integration of external environment, and the maximisation of natural heat, ventilation and light" with Manchester City Council's planning department requiring a distinctive landmark design providing variety to a location predominantly made up of two-storey semi-detached residential properties and low-rise retail units.

The design by Stephenson Bell won the competition. Tom Bloxham, of Urban Splash, one of the judges, admired the scheme so much that he offered to become a joint venture partner in the development. After Urban Splash came on board the scheme was altered slightly to provide underground parking with additional duplex units along its front elevation on Barlow Moor Road.

== Design ==
The scheme is predominantly of three-storey construction, with a five-storey element overlooking Chorlton Park. All units can be accessed by disabled users and the individual apartments are accessed via an open timber deck with a lift servicing all floors including the basement car park. The building has low embodied energy, is highly insulated. Communal space includes the underground car park, circulation areas, roof garden and courtyard garden with barbecue facility and basement bicycle store. There is a single entrance devised to encourage communal activity.

Natural light is maximised by the orientation of its living rooms with bedrooms located on the inner or courtyard side of the building to minimise noise from the street. Each apartment has a balcony with louvred screens on rollers to provide shade and privacy. They are designed to be an extension of the living space and are constructed using a frame of green-oak posts and beams which were reclaimed from a wind-damaged forest in France.

The architect used high insulation and energy conservation measures to ensure energy efficiency and the U value of the building is increased to 0.11 to ensure low heating costs. Its construction is of timber platform frame improved cost effectiveness and used renewable materials. The external materials are designed to be easily maintained through the use of robust materials.

== Construction ==
The building employs a timber frame construction, with innovative balconies of reclaimed bare timber which overlook Chorlton Park across Barlow Moor Road.

The structure gives the appearance of masonry, but it is actually a highly insulated timber frame. The units all have generous balconies, framed in wind-toppled French oak, with sliding louvred shutters to control privacy and sunlight, which look out on to the parkland across the road. This is quite a busy thoroughfare, particularly at peak hours, but the flats are remarkably quiet.

Contaminated fill was cleared, providing space for a basement car park of in situ concrete. Sustainable construction and low heating and maintenance costs were among the priorities in developing the site. To deliver the necessary level of heat retention, we made walls and floors of sealed units filled with insulating material. Each unit is formed from timber joists some 300 mm deep, set close together and sandwiched between floorboards or sheets of marine ply. Externally, the architect's choice of materials is emphasized by the oak-framed balconies provided for every apartment.

== See also ==
- Roger Stephenson
