= London Road Fire Station, Manchester =

Former fire station in Manchester, England

Coordinates: 53°28′36″N 2°13′56″W

London Road Fire Station
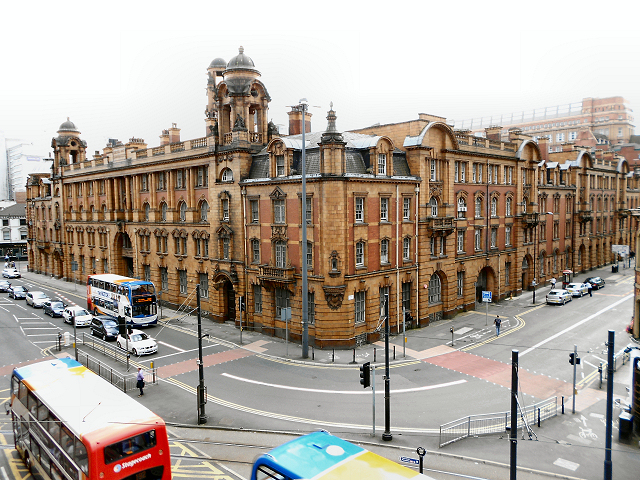
- View from junction of London Road and Whitworth Street

General information
- Type: Mixed use
- Architectural style: Edwardian baroque architecture
- Location: Manchester, England
- Construction started: 1904
- Completed: 27 September 1906
- Cost: £142,000
- Client: Manchester City Council

Technical details
- Floor count: 4

Design and construction
- Architects: Woodhouse, Willoughby & Langham (Manchester)
- Other designers: J J Millson, G W Parker
- Designations

Listed Building – Grade II*
- Official name: Police and Fire Station
- Designated: 3 October 1974
- Reference no.: 1197918

London Road Fire Station is a former fire station in Manchester, England. It was opened in 1906, on a site bounded by London Road, Whitworth Street, Minshull Street South and Fairfield Street. Designed in the Edwardian Baroque style by Woodhouse, Willoughby and Langham in red brick and terracotta, it cost £142,000 to build and was built by J. Gerrard and Sons of Swinton. It has been a Grade II* listed building since 1974.

In addition to a fire station, the building housed a police station, an ambulance station, a bank, a coroner's court, and a gas-meter testing station. The fire station operated for 80 years, housing the firemen, their families, and the horse-drawn appliances that were replaced by motorised vehicles a few years after its opening. It was visited by royalty in 1942, in recognition of the brigade's wartime efforts. After the war it became a training centre and in 1952 became the first centre equipped to record emergency calls. However, the fire station became expensive to maintain and after council reorganisation decline set in. The building was the headquarters of the Manchester Fire Brigade until the brigade was replaced by the Greater Manchester Fire Service in 1974. The fire station closed in 1986, since when it has been largely unused despite several redevelopment proposals.

It was placed on English Heritage's Buildings at Risk Register in 2001 and in 2010; Manchester City Council served a compulsory purchase order on the fire station's owner, Britannia Hotels. Britannia announced in 2015 their intention to sell the building after nearly 30 years of dereliction. It was sold to Allied London in 2015 and renovation commenced in 2018 with the building to be redeveloped as a mixed-use comprising leisure and hotel facilities.

== Construction ==
In 1897 the Manchester Watch Committee was considering a replacement for its fire station on Jackson's Row. A five-man sub-committee was set up and recommended a site on Newton Street. In 1899, George William Parker, who had designed fire stations in Bootle and Belfast, and been referred to as the "architect of the world's fire service", was appointed Chief of the Manchester Fire Brigade and asked his opinion on the proposal. Parker reported that the site on Newton Street was unsuitable and submitted plans for a fire station on a site bounded by London Road, Whitworth Street, Minshull Street South and Fairfield Street.

Parker's proposal was for a 7-bay fire station on a site more than double the size of the one proposed on Newton Street. The choice of London Road was influenced by its proximity to a development of warehouses on Whitworth Street and Princess Street. Parker convinced the city council to choose his proposals rather than those on Newton Street.

A competition, with prizes of £300, £200 and £100 (equivalent to £32,000, £21,000 and £11,000 in 2025) was organised to design the new fire station. The competition drew interest from across the country, attracting 25 entries. The winning entry was by John Henry Woodhouse, George Harry Willoughby and John Langham, a team of local architects. Their design was based closely on Parker's initial plans. The fire station was described by Fire Call magazine as "the finest fire station in this round world" before construction started.

The fire station was built between 1904 and 1906 at a cost of £142,000 (equivalent to £14.9 million in 2025). The building's substructure and foundations were built by C. H. Normanton of Manchester. The superstructure was built by Gerrard's of Swinton at a cost of £75,360. It was faced with red brick and terracotta by Burmantofts, a common choice for early 20th-century buildings in Manchester as it was cleanable and resisted the pollution and acid rain caused by local industry. Other notable Manchester buildings from this era making use of terracotta include the Midland Hotel, the Refuge Assurance Building, the University of Manchester's Sackville Street Building and the Victoria Baths. The building's exterior featured sculptural models by John Jarvis Millson representing the functions of the building such as justice, fire and water.

The building had stained glass windows and the interior was decorated with glazed bricks, similar to other public buildings of this era in the city, such as the Victoria Baths. The similarities suggest the influence and adoption of a standard design by Henry Price's newly created City Architect's Department.

== Operation ==
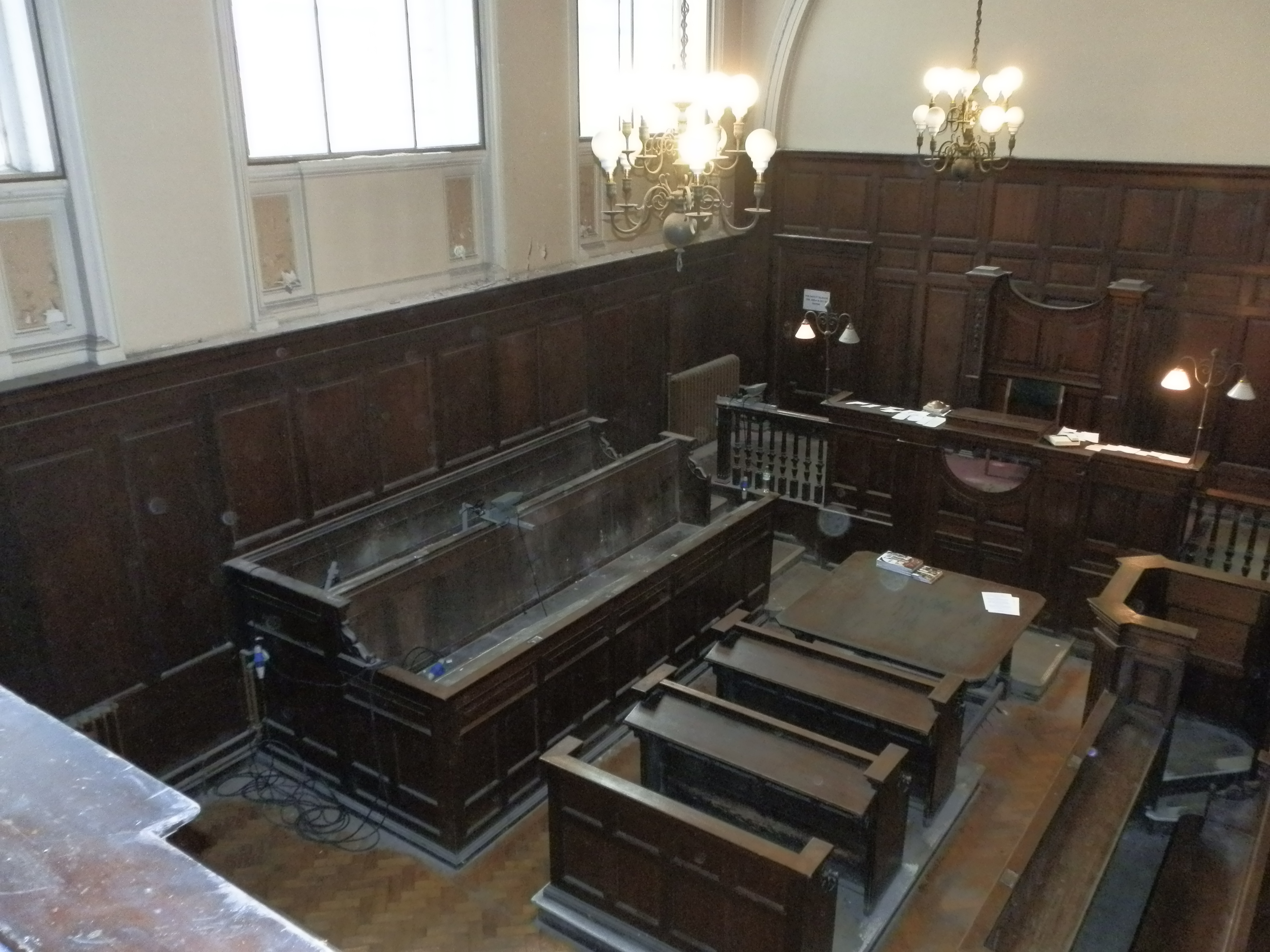
The station's coroner's court

The building was opened on 27 September 1906 by the Lord Mayor of Manchester James Herbert Thewlis. In addition to the fire station, it housed a police station on Whitworth Street, an ambulance station on Minshull Street South, a branch of Williams Deacon's Bank at the corner of London Road and Fairfield Street, a coroner's court, and a gas-meter testing station on London Road. The coroner's court and gas-meter testing station replaced the proposed public library and gym.

Plan showing the layout of the building. Legend Fire Station Ambulance Station Police Station Gas-meter Testing Station Coroner's Court Bank

The fire station contained flats for 32 firemen and their families and six single firemen. Facilities included a laundry, gym, billiards room and children's play-areas. The complex contained stables for the horses that pulled the fire appliances, and a blacksmith's workshop. There were electric bells and lights to alert firemen to an alarm, poles to expedite the firemen's response, suspended harnesses to allow the horses to be harnessed quickly, and electric doors. The fire station was also designed with foresight; the appliance bays were made wide enough to take motorised fire appliances. The station's first motorised fire appliance arrived in 1911, five years after it opened.

The building has a 130-foot (40 m) hose tower and a ventilation system designed by Musgrave and Company to prevent the odour from the horses' stalls entering the firemen's living quarters. Fresh air was drawn in through the top of the fire station's tower, purified and circulated around the building. When the air reached the end of the circuit, in the stalls, it was extracted from the building. The system meant that the air in the building was replaced every 10 minutes.

During the Second World War, the basement was converted into an air-raid shelter and an extension built in the yard to provide more space in the control room. The fire services were nationalised in 1941, and London Road became the headquarters of Division C. In recognition of the fire fighters' efforts, King George VI and Queen Elizabeth visited the fire station in 1942.

After the war, the Manchester Fire Brigade was again municipalised, and reorganised. London Road Fire Station was restored as the headquarters of the brigade and became the only fire station serving the city centre. A fire service training centre was established in 1948. At about the same time, the ambulance station closed and was converted into the fire brigade's workshops. The control room was modernised in 1952, becoming the first in the country with equipment to record emergency calls.

The interior was refurbished in 1955. The exterior had been cleaned every year since the fire station opened, and as a result was in pristine condition when the building celebrated its Golden Jubilee on 6 October 1956.

== Decline ==
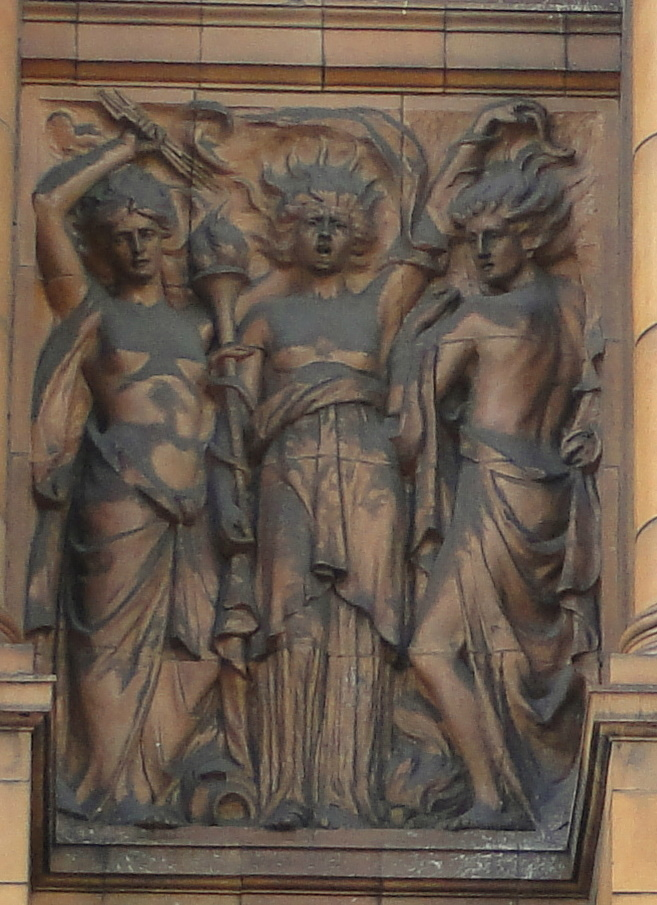
A relief panel above London Road entrance, representing fire

By the end of the 1960s, maintenance was becoming increasingly expensive, and the building's design ill-suited to modern fire appliances. Plans to replace the fire station were put on hold pending the formation of the Greater Manchester Fire Service.

The building has been Grade II* listed since 1974, the same year that the replacement of the Manchester Fire Brigade by the Greater Manchester Fire Service precipitated the relocation of the brigade's headquarters to a new facility in Swinton. As part of the reorganisation, London Road became the headquarters of the brigade's "E Division", with the station's control room responsible for two divisions covering the City of Manchester, the Metropolitan Borough of Stockport and Tameside.

The reorganisation meant the number of appliances was reduced, until only three remained at the station. The control room at London Road closed in 1979, replaced by a single computerised control room at brigade headquarters in Swinton.

In the same year, following the establishment of Greater Manchester Police and a reorganisation of policing in the city, the police station in the building also closed. The closure left the ground floor on the Whitworth Street side empty. The last tenants of the bank section, a firm of solicitors, and the fire brigade's workshops, also vacated the building at about the same time.

In 1984 construction work began on a £2.4 million, 4.5-acre (1.8 ha) replacement on Thompson Street and in 1985 the old London Road Fire Station was brought within the Whitworth Street Conservation Area. In 1986 the fire service left London Road for its new fire station, London Road Fire Station closed and the building was sold.

== Dereliction and redevelopment ==
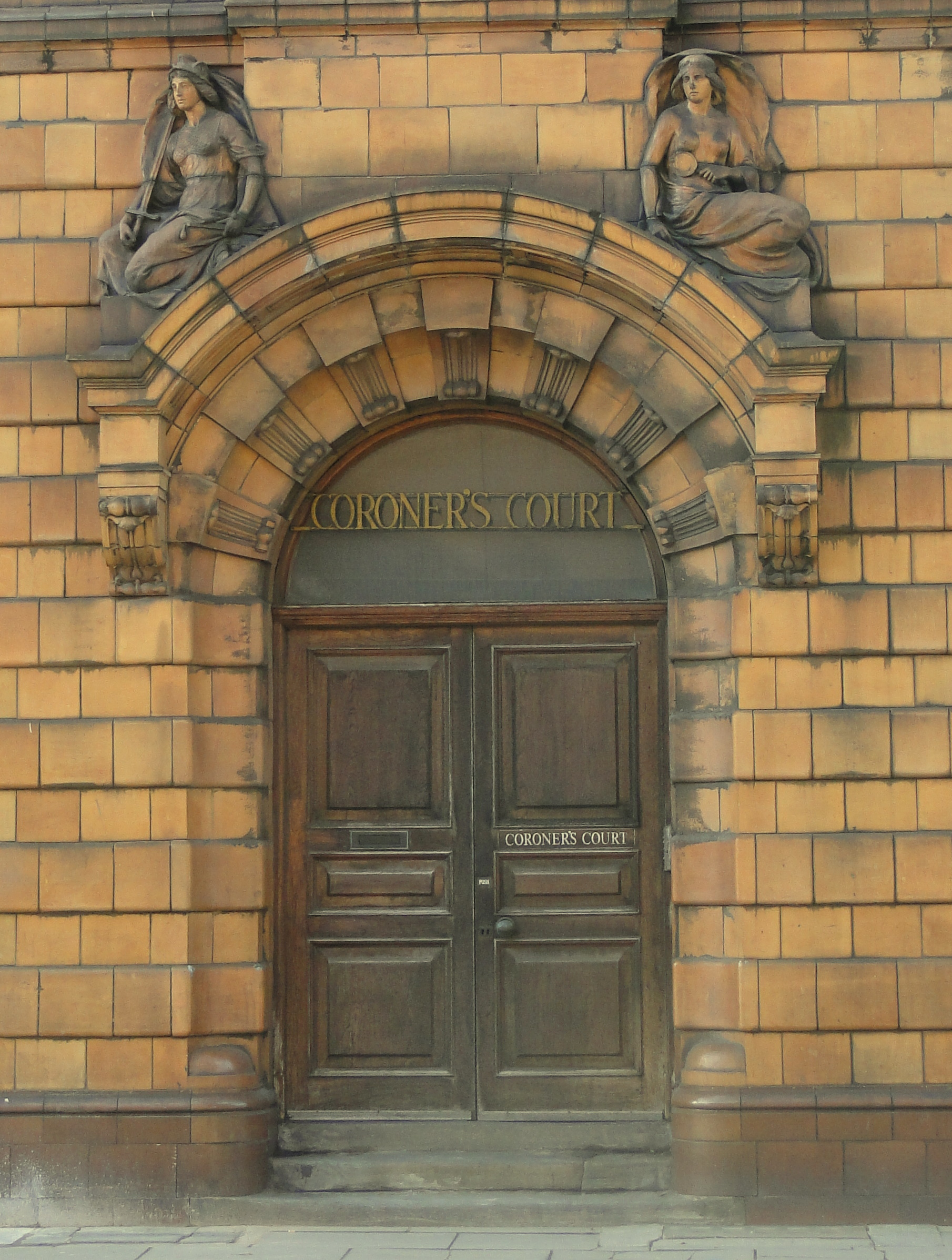
The entrance to the Coroner's Court. Above the doorway to the left is Lady Justice. The mirror held by the woman on the right represents truth.

=== 1986 purchase and decline ===
After the sale in 1986, the building was mainly used for storage whilst planning applications to convert it into a hotel were made in 1986, 1993, and 2001, with varying degrees of success. The coroner's court was the last to vacate the premises, in 1998. In 2001 the building was placed on English Heritage's Buildings at Risk Register. By 2004 it was in steep decline, and momentum was building for the fire station's owner, Britannia Hotels, to act.

=== 2006 plans ===
In February 2006, Argent proposed leasing the building from Britannia Hotels to transform it into a music and arts venue. Manchester City Council backed the plans and refused to rule out a compulsory purchase order (CPO) if the owner did not act to redevelop the building. Britannia Hotels branded Argent's plans "unworkable" and proposed turning the building into a company headquarters, 200-bed hotel, and fire station museum. A planning application was promised by March 2006, but by May none had been made. Work was carried out by February 2007 to make the building watertight and in autumn 2007 a proposal was made by Britannia to convert the building into a hotel.

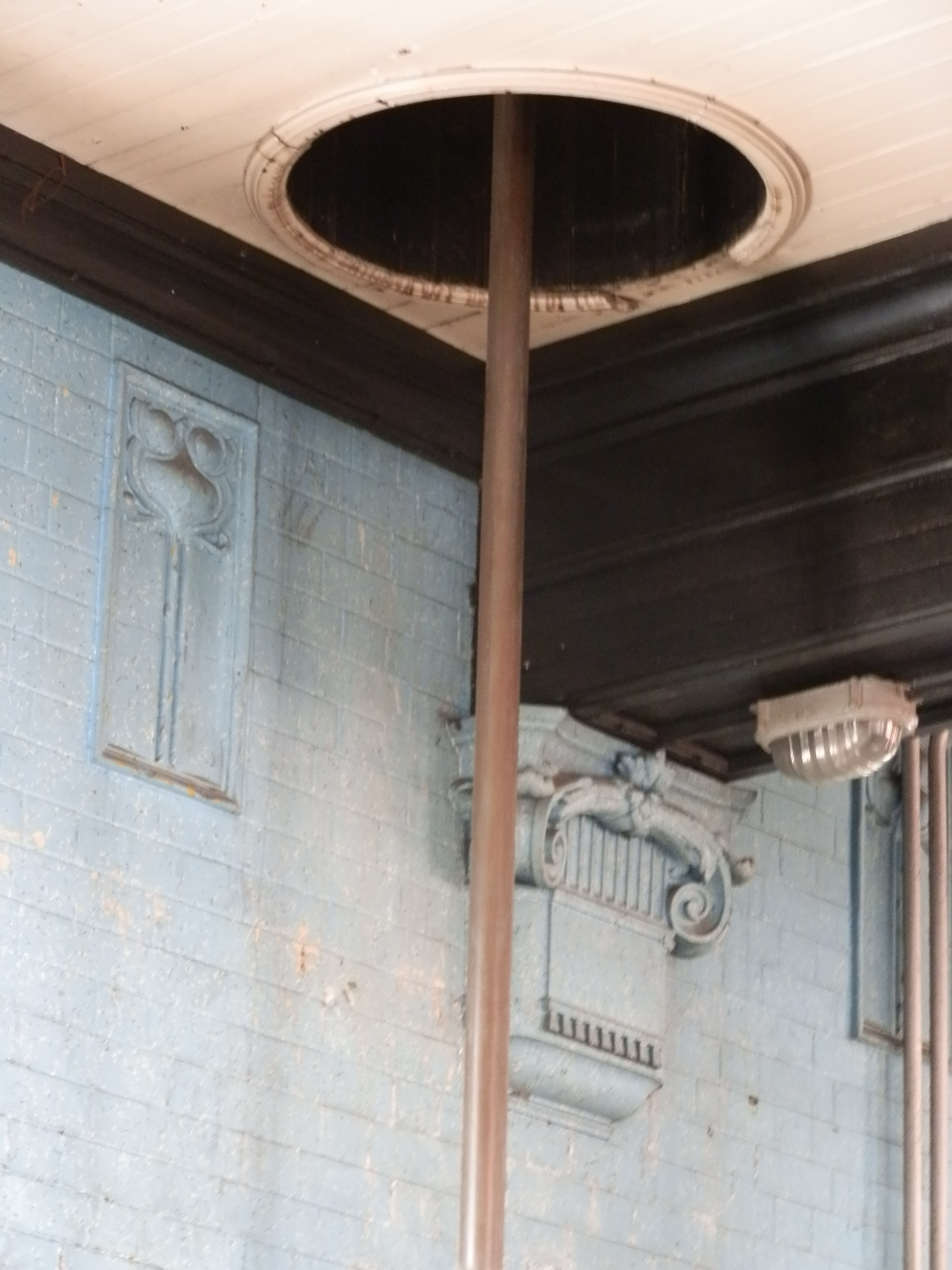
Fireman's pole in the fire engine room.

Britannia Hotels appointed Purcell Miller Tritton to draw up plans to convert the building into a hotel in 2008 but none were produced by May 2009 and the city council lost faith in Britannia Hotels' commitment to its redevelopment. The city council was concerned that the state of the fire station was limiting regeneration in the area, including a proposed government complex on the former Mayfield railway station site. The city council set a deadline of July 2009 for progress on redevelopment. Britannia Hotels' proposal in July 2009 was to convert the fire station into a hotel with a 15-storey tower in its courtyard and promised a planning application by October 2009, but none was made and the city council's chief executive recommended issuing a CPO.

=== 2010 CPO issued ===
A meeting of the city council in January 2010 approved a request for up to £5.25 million to cover the costs associated with the fire station's acquisition. Britannia Hotels responded by pledging to make a new proposal by February 2010, rendering the CPO unnecessary. Britannia submitted an application to turn the fire station into a 227-bed 4-star hotel in June 2010. The Victorian Society praised the proposed conversion. Manchester City Council decided to continue with the CPO. The city council issued a CPO on 5 August 2010. Despite the plans being approved on 16 September 2010, the council continued to pursue a CPO and solicited bids for a development partner in January 2011.

=== 2011 CPO rejected ===
Britannia's objection to the CPO led to a public inquiry in April 2011. On 29 November 2011, the Department for Communities and Local Government confirmed the CPO had been rejected. Despite Britannia's guarantee at the inquiry to proceed with the development, it reconsidered its plans. In a letter to English Heritage, Britannia said the proposed scheme was unsustainable for the foreseeable future. Britannia wanted to return to the rejected tower plan. English Heritage and the city council expressed disappointment. The city council offered to buy the building at market value.

=== 2013 campaign for a second CPO ===
In February 2013 after a public meeting, the Friends of London Road Fire Station (FoLRFS) was formed to pressurise Britannia Hotels and persuade the council to attempt a second CPO. The group organised an online petition, fundraising events, public meetings, an online survey to discover locals' views, an art exhibition and public engagement with its history, and published the outcome of a Freedom of Information Act request on what the council had done regarding surveying the building and issuing urgent-works notices. In November 2013, Britannia applied to extend the 2010 planning permissions but despite objections the applications were approved on technical grounds in December 2013.

=== 2014 second CPO started ===
The council considered applying for a CPO for the second time in September 2014 and confirmed its intention to do so in December 2014 and meet with FoLRFS in early 2015. FoLRFS received a grant from Locality's Community Assets in Difficult Ownership (CADO) programme to pay for public outreach work. On 30 April 2015, FoLRFS met Pat Bartoli, head of the council's urban regeneration team and Howard Bernstein who praised their campaign.

=== 2015 owner sells the building ===
It was announced immediately after the meeting that Britannia Hotels had decided to sell the building. London Road Fire Station was put on the market on 1 May 2015 and expected offers of around £10 million while restoration is expected to cost £20–30 million. Allied London acquired the fire station on 16 November 2015.

=== 2017–present: mixed-use conversion project ===
In 2017 the council approved plans to convert the building into a mixed-use development featuring a 91-room boutique hotel, offices, apartments, a cinema, a luxury spa, and various bars and restaurants. Although initial reports suggested the facility could open by 2019, construction work is still ongoing as of August 2026.

== See also ==
- Grade II* listed buildings in Greater Manchester
- Listed buildings in Manchester-M1
