= Midland Hotel, Bradford =

Victorian hotel in Bradford, England

Midland Hotel
- Main entrance to the hotel

General information
- Location: Forster Square, Bradford BD1 4HU
- Coordinates: 53.7953°N 1.7518°W
- Opening: 1890 (original); 1993 (restored)
- Owner: Britannia Hotels
- Operator: Britannia Hotels

Design and construction
- Architect: Charles Trubshaw
- Developer: Midland Railway Company

Other information
- Number of rooms: 90
- Number of restaurants: 1
- Parking: 40 spaces (free for guests)

Website
- https://www.britanniahotels.com/hotels/midland-hotel-bradford

The Midland Hotel is a 90-bedroom three-star Victorian hotel in Bradford city centre, owned and managed by Britannia Hotels.

The architect was Charles Trubshaw, who was contracted to design many railway stations for Midland Railway Company.

Construction of the hotel began in 1885 and took five years to complete. It was built by the Midland Railway Company as part of the original Forster Square Railway Station, as a showpiece for the company's northern operations.

Following the "golden age of steam" the hotel fell into disrepair until it was bought by Bradford entrepreneur John Pennington in 1992, who restored it and the hotel re-opened as the Pennington Midland Hotel in 1993. It was sold to Peel Hotels in December 1998, who returned it back to its original name.

The hotel was sold to Britannia Hotels in 2023

During its life, the hotel has played host to many famous guests, including Sir Henry Irving, an English stage actor, who died there in 1905.

The corner block of the hotel on Lower Kirkgate (pictured) was made a grade II listed building in 1983.

== See also ==
- Listed buildings in Bradford (City Ward)
