= Albert Hall, Manchester =

Music venue in Manchester, England

Coordinates: 53.47826°N 2.24793°W

Albert Hall
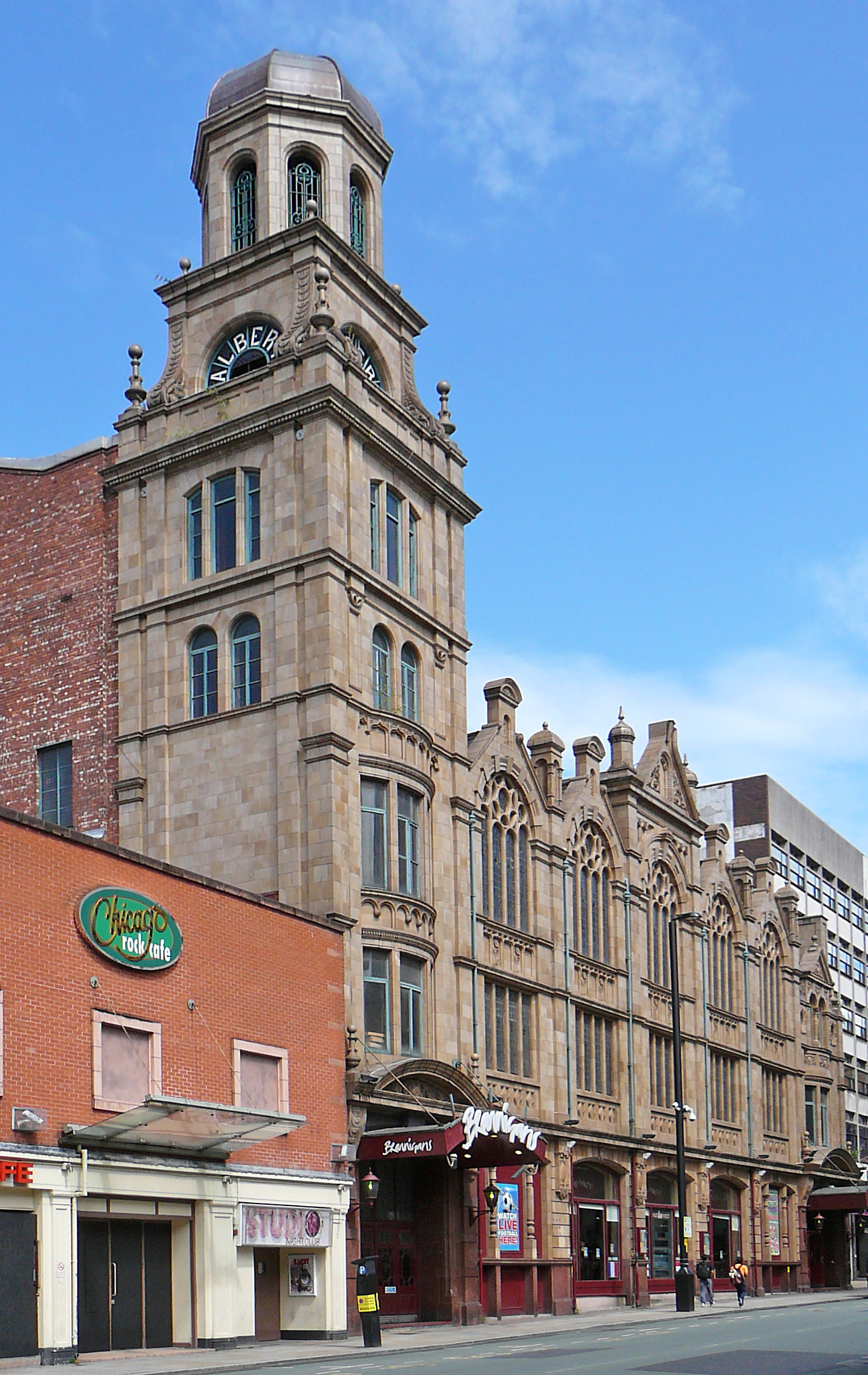
- Exterior of venue seen from Peter Street, c. 2010
- Former names: Albert Hall and Aston Institute (1910–69); Brannigans (1999–2011)
- Alternative names: Albert Mission Hall

General information
- Architectural style: Neo-Baroque
- Location: 27 Peter Street, Manchester, M2 5QR, England
- Groundbreaking: 1908
- Opened: 1910
- Renovated: 2012–14
- Closed: July 1969—March 1999
- Cost: £55,000 ($5.72 million in 2025 dollars)
- Renovation cost: £3.5 million
- Owner: Mission Mars

Design and construction
- Architect: W. J. Morley
- Main contractor: J. Gerrard and Sons
- Designations

Listed Building – Grade II
- Official name: Albert Memorial Hall
- Designated: 29 April 1982
- Reference no.: 1246727

Other information
- Seating capacity: 2,290

Website
- alberthallmanchester.com

The Albert Hall is a music venue on Peter Street in Manchester, England.

Built as a Methodist central hall in 1908 by the architect William James Morley of Bradford and built by J. Gerrard & Sons Ltd of Swinton, it has been designated by Historic England as a Grade II listed building. The main floor was used as a nightclub from 1999 to 2011. The second floor, the Chapel Hall, unused since 1969, was renovated in 2012–14 for music concerts.

The venue hosted a few events towards the end of 2013. It officially reopened on 6 February 2014, with a performance by Anna Calvi.

== History ==
The hall was designed in an eclectic style with Baroque and Gothic elements for the Wesleyan Mission in 1908. A meeting hall is on the first floor with a horseshoe gallery, sloping floor and coloured glass rooflights. The finely detailed terracotta is formed into large windows at gallery level, and the interior is abundant in floral decoration in the plaster work and glazed tiles.

In the 1990s, the lower two floors were converted into a nightclub called Brannigans which closed in 2011. The hall was refurbished and re-opened in 2013 by Trof, a local independent bar and live music company.
