= Edward Caldwell Spruce =

English sculptor and artist

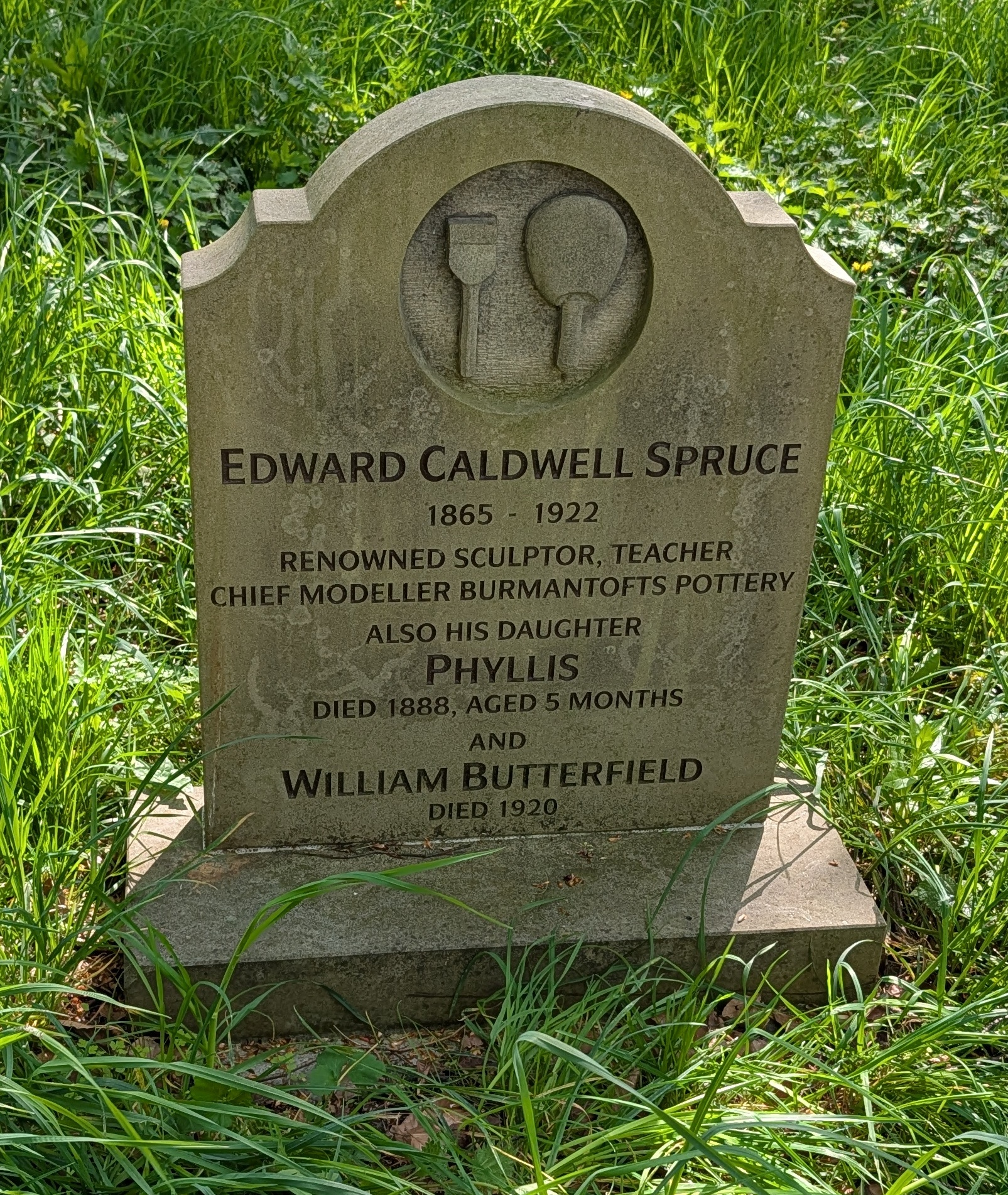
- Born: 1865
- Died: 7 June 1922 (aged 56–57)
- Occupation: Sculptor

Edward Caldwell Spruce (1865 – 7 June 1922) was an English sculptor and artist who mainly worked in Leeds.

== Biography ==
Spruce was born in Knutsford, Cheshire in the summer of 1865. Between 1891 and 1893 he was a student at the Leeds College of Art where he also taught clay modelling.

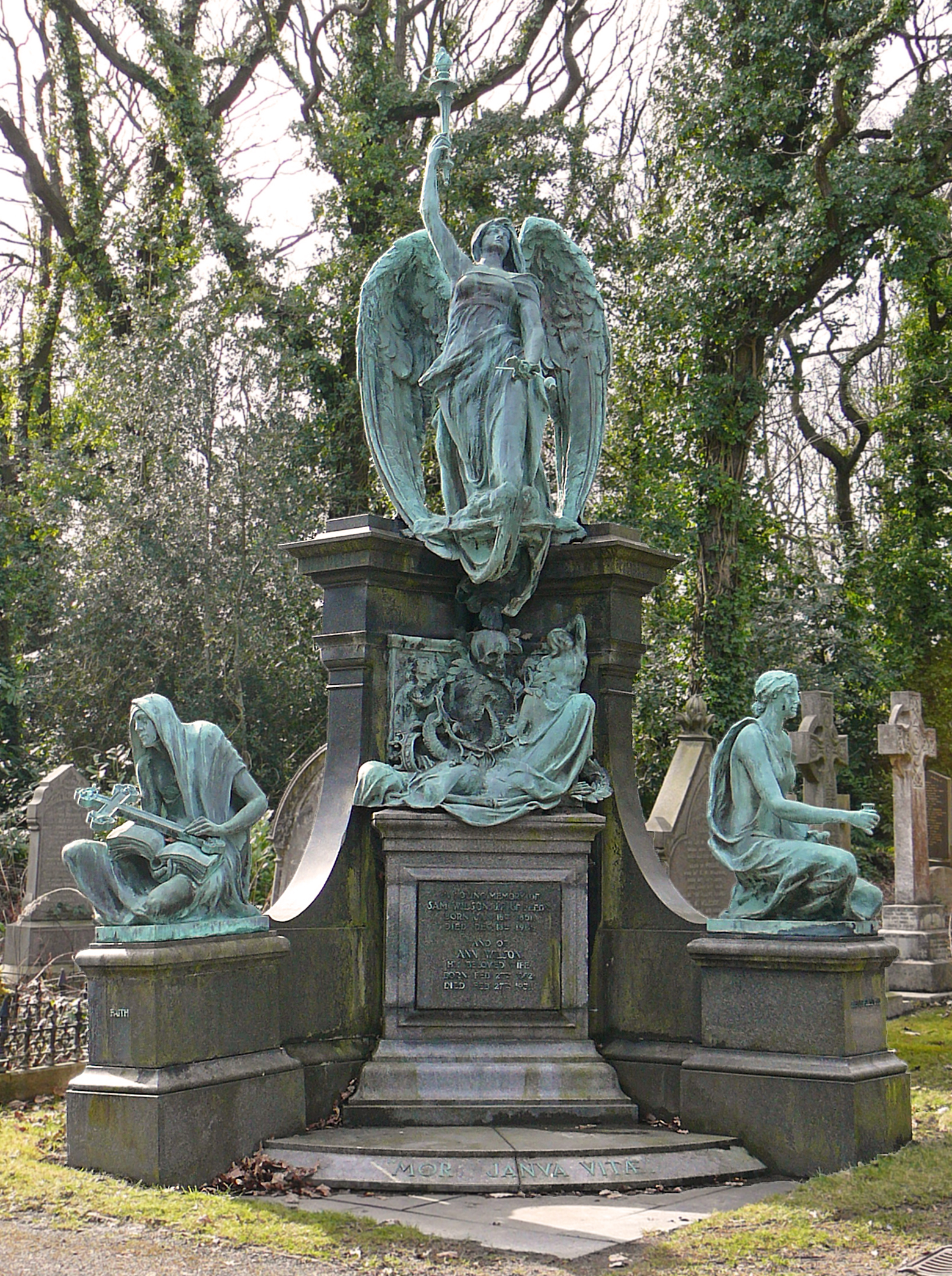
Monument by Spruce to Sam and Ann Wilson in Lawnswood Cemetery, Leeds

Spruce first worked at a local tile factory before moving to Burmantofts Pottery in Leeds, where he was the principal modeller. His work there includes some fine panels on the Midland Hotel, Manchester. He went to Paris to study art and exhibited a piece called "The Blind Man" at the 1908 Salon. He returned to Leeds to set up as a freelance artist with a studio in Chapeltown, Leeds. In this he was successful, performing numerous portrait commissions of contemporarary figures including a bust of the Lord Mayor of Leeds, Sir James Kitson. Between 1906 and 1915 he exhibited at least four works at the Royal Academy in London. He also created the panels for the war memorial at Bailiff Bridge in West Yorkshire. Possibly Spruce's best known work is the 1918 large multi-figure memorial to the Leeds businessman Sam Wilson at Lawnswood Cemetery in Leeds. The monument is recognised by Historic England with a Grade II listing.

Spruce was also a noted member of the Leeds branch of the Savage Club, becoming its "Indian Chief" (i.e. president) in 1912. He died in 1922 in Leeds.
