= Barlow Moor =

Area of Manchester, England

Coordinates: 53.43°N 2.26°W

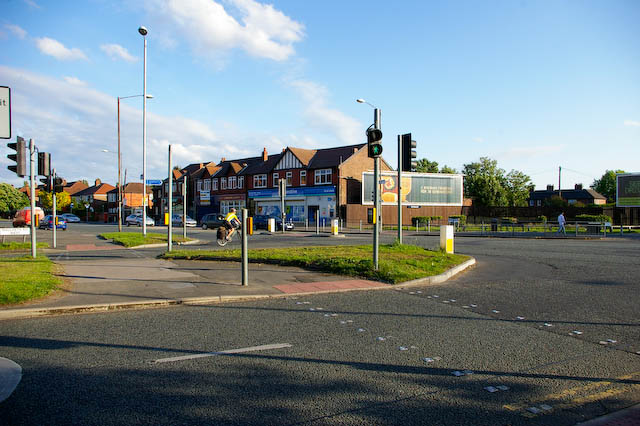
The junction of Barlow Moor Road and Mauldeth Road West

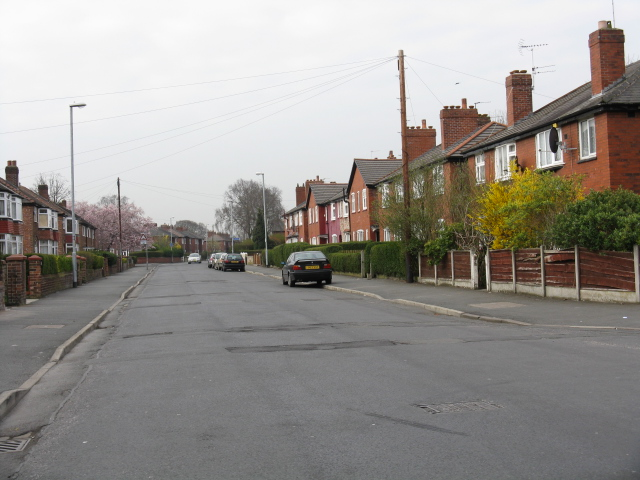
Maitland Avenue, one of the residential roads in the area between Southern Cemetery and Chorlton Water Park

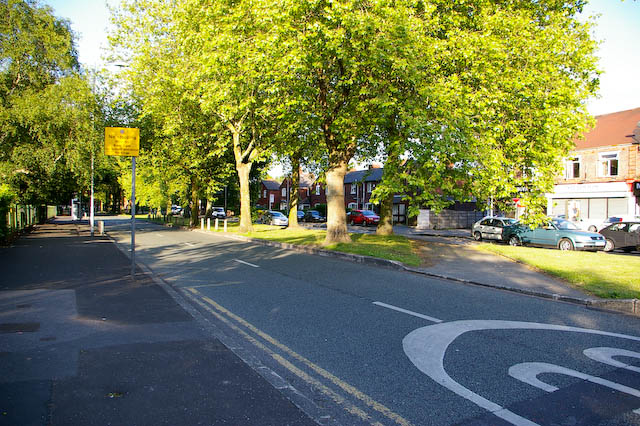
Mauldeth Road West

Barlow Moor is an area of Manchester, England. It was originally an area of moorland between Didsbury and Chorlton-cum-Hardy and was named after the Barlow family of Barlow Hall. Barlow Moor Road runs through the area and connects to Wilmslow Road at the southern end and Manchester Road at the northern end. Southern Cemetery and Chorlton Park are landmarks on the route. Immediately adjacent to the northwest corner of the cemetery, also on Barlow Moor Road, is the Manchester Crematorium which opened in 1892, the second in the United Kingdom. The architects were Steinthal and Solomons who chose to revive the Lombard-Romanesque style. Another notable building is the Chorlton Park Apartments, 2002.

During the English Civil War, Prince Rupert camped on Barlow Moor, halfway between two strategic crossing points of the River Mersey. Prince Charles Edward Stuart, 'Bonnie Prince Charlie', camped here on his way to, and retreat from, Derby in the Rebellion of 1745.

The area has been largely in Chorlton Park ward of the City of Manchester since 1998; previously there was a Barlow Moor ward. John Leech former MP for Manchester Withington has been a City councillor for both these wards; he was succeeded as councillor for Chorlton Park by Bernie Ryan.

The Roman Catholic church of St Ambrose, Princess Road, was built in 1958 to the designs of architects Reynolds & Stone. The dedication to St Ambrose of Milan was chosen because St Ambrose Barlow's birthplace was in the parish. The church of St Barnabas (opened 1951) in Hurstville Road is an Anglican chapel-of-ease dependent on St Clement's Church and serves the Barlow Moor estate and south Chorlton.

== See also ==
- Barlow Moor Road Metrolink station
- A5145
- Fullen Gaels, sports club
