= Charles Trubshaw =

English architect

- Born: 1 January 1840; Staffordshire, England
- Died: 15 February 1917 (aged 77); Derby, England
- Occupation: Architect
- Buildings: Midland Railway stations and hotels

Charles Trubshaw FRIBA (1840 – 15 February 1917) was an architect specifically associated with railway buildings on the London and North Western Railway and Midland Railway lines.

== Career ==
He trained as an architect in the office of his father, also Charles Trubshaw (1811–1862), a civil engineer and also county surveyor for Staffordshire.

He was appointed Associate of the Royal Institute of British Architects on 6 February 1864, and Fellow of the Royal Institute of British Architects on 6 November 1882.

He was on the engineering and architectural staff of the London and North Western Railway 1864–1874. He was then architect to the Northern Division of the Midland Railway from 1874. On the death of John Holloway Sanders in 1884 he became chief architect to the Midland Railway, and held this position until 1905.

== Work ==
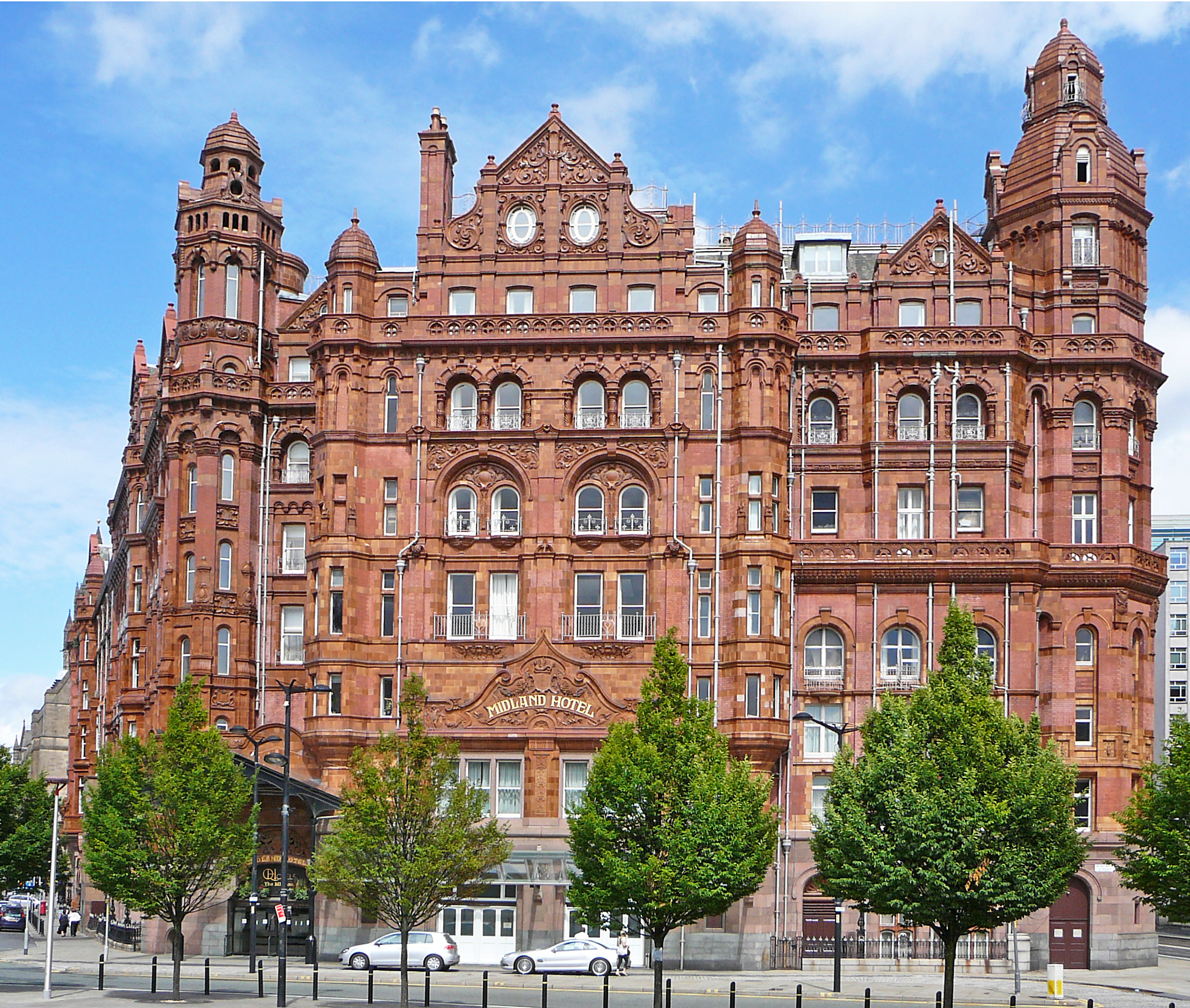
Midland Hotel in Manchester of 1898–1903

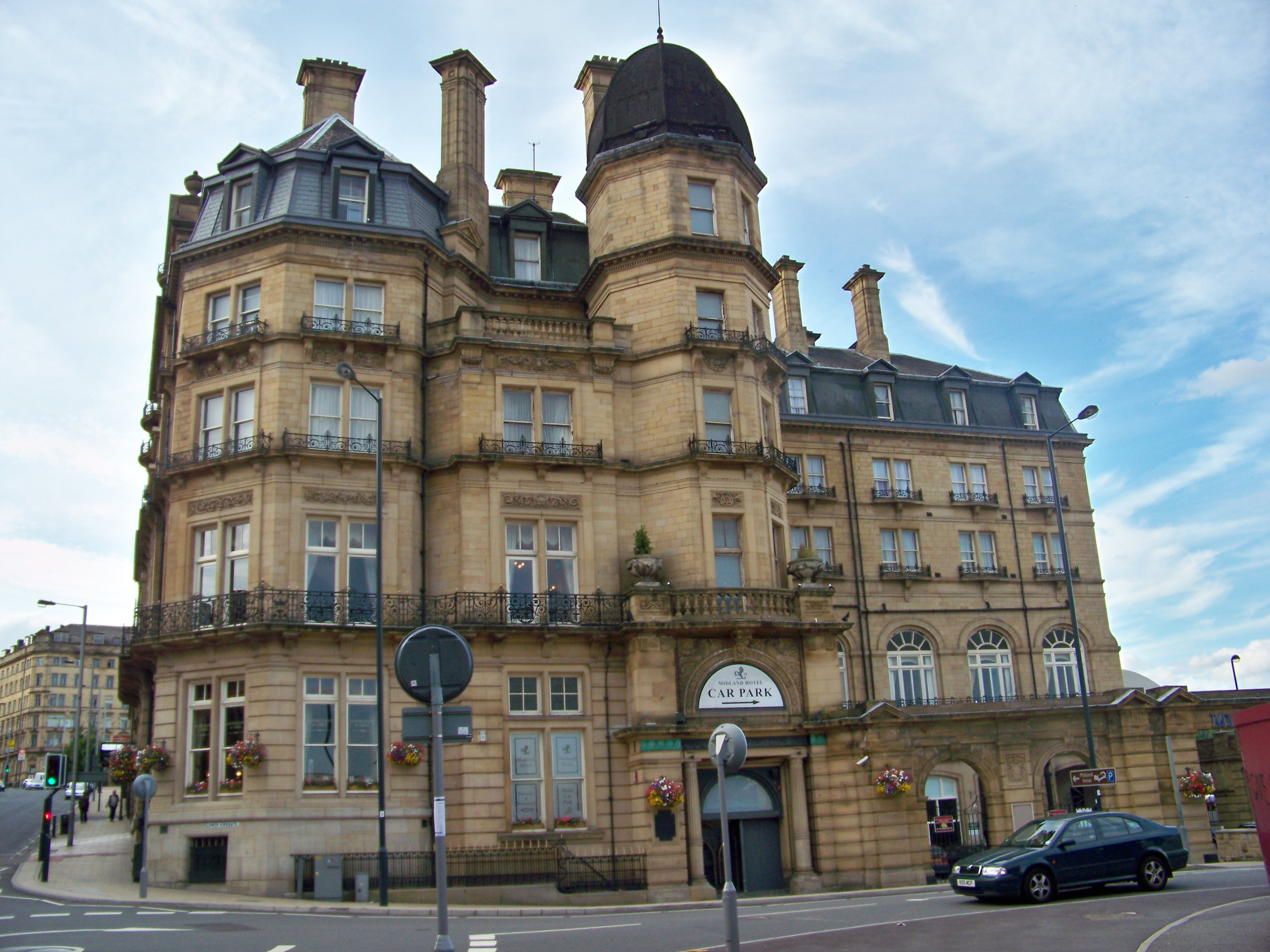
Midland Hotel, Bradford

- Kettering railway station
- Shipley railway station
- Skipton railway station
- Hellifield railway station 1880
- Kimberley West railway station 1882
- Keighley railway station 1883–1885
- Midland Hotel, Bradford 1885–1890
- Oakhurst House, Derbyshire 1888 Enlargement
- Bradford Forster Square railway station 1890
- Bingley railway station 1892
- Derby railway station 1893 – extensions (demolished)
- Midland Railway Institute, Derby 1894
- Leicester railway station 1892–1894
- Langley Mill railway station 1895
- Midland Hotel, Manchester 1898 – 1903
- Nottingham Midland railway station 1904
- Sheffield station 1905 enlargement
