= Roger Stephenson =

- Born: 1946 (age 79–80); London, England
- Occupation: Architect
- Practice: Stephenson Studio
- Buildings: Chethams School of Music, Manchester Chorlton Park, Manchester; Deansgate Quay, Manchester; Lounge at T1 Manchester Airport; Radisson Edwardian Hotel, Hotel The Haçienda Apartments

Roger Stephenson OBE (born London 1946) is an English architect and is the Managing Partner of Stephenson Studio in Manchester.

== Background ==
Stephenson studied architecture at the Liverpool University School of Architecture. After graduating he worked with Building Design Partnership and was partner at Michael Hyde & Partners in Manchester before founding his own practice, established in 1979.

The Practice has been awarded over 40 national awards for buildings it has designed and was shortlisted for the Stirling Prize in 1998 for the Quay Bar, Castlefield and again in 2013 for Chetham's School of Music. It has received acclaim for the way he has dealt with new uses in terms of the historical context found in most British cities. As a recognition to his services to architecture, Stephenson was appointed an OBE in the Birthday Honour's List of 2001.

Stephenson has held a number of external positions; he was a visiting professor and external examiner at the Chinese University of Hong Kong, external examiner at Newcastle University, a Civic Trust assessor, jury chairman for the RIBA Awards and was an RIBA national councillor. He was a member of the CABE national design panel for 6 years and Chairman of RIBA North West.

== Notable buildings designed ==
- Chetham's School of Music New Building
- North House, Bowden
- Trafford College
- Manchester Central
- Radisson Blu Edwardian Free Trade Hall Hotel
- Alderley Park Research Area Link Infrastructure
- City Tower renovation, Manchester
- Chorlton Park Apartments, Chorlton Park, Manchester
- Quay Bar
- The Haçienda Apartments, Manchester
- Smithfield Buildings, Smithfield Market, Manchester
- Houldsworth Mill, Reddish, Stockport
