= Free Trade Hall =

Listed building in Manchester, England

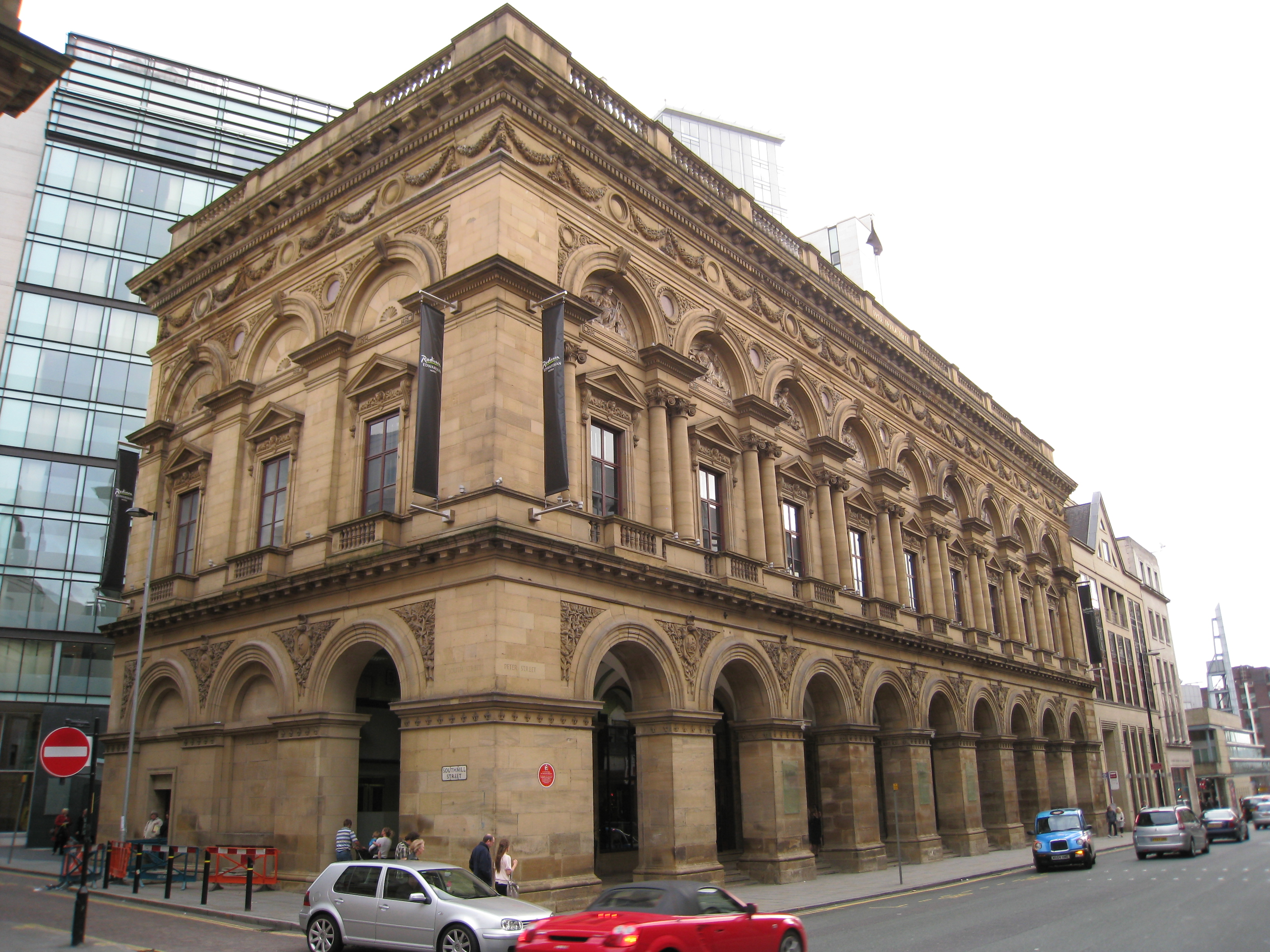
- The Free Trade Hall

General information
- Architectural style: Palazzo
- Location: Peter Street, Manchester, England
- Coordinates: 53°28′40″N 2°14′50″W
- Construction started: 1853
- Completed: 1856

Design and construction
- Architect: Edward Walters
- Designations

Listed Building – Grade II*
- Official name: Free Trade Hall
- Designated: 18 December 1963
- Reference no.: 1246666

The Free Trade Hall on Peter Street in Manchester, England, was constructed in 1853–1856 on St Peter's Fields, the site of the Peterloo Massacre. It is now a Radisson hotel.

The hall was built to commemorate the repeal of the Corn Laws in 1846. The architect was Edward Walters. It was owned by the Manchester Corporation and was bombed in the Manchester Blitz; its interior was rebuilt and it was Manchester's premier concert venue until the construction of the Bridgewater Hall in 1996. The hall was designated a Grade II* listed building in 1963.

== History ==
The Free Trade Hall was built as a public hall between 1853 and 1856 by Edward Walters on land given by Richard Cobden in St Peter's Fields, the site of the Peterloo Massacre. Two earlier halls had been constructed on the site, the first, a large timber pavilion was built in 1840, and its brick replacement built in 1842. The halls were "vital to Manchester's considerable role in the long campaign for the repeal of the Corn Laws. The hall was funded by public subscription and became a concert hall and home of the Hallé Orchestra in 1858. A red plaque records that it was built on the site of the Peterloo Massacre in 1819.

The Free Trade Hall was bought by Manchester Corporation in 1920. It was targeted in the Manchester Blitz of December 1940; severely damaged, it sat as an empty shell for some years following the end of World War II. A new hall was constructed behind two walls of the original façade in 1950–1951, to a design by Manchester City Council's architect, L. C. Howitt. It opened as a concert hall in 1951. As well as being the venue for the Hallé Orchestra, it was also used for pop and rock concerts. A Wurlitzer organ from the Paramount Cinema in Manchester was installed over four years and first used in public in a BBC programme broadcast in September 1977. When the hall closed, the organ, which was on loan, was moved to the great hall in Stockport Town Hall. The Hallé Orchestra moved to the Bridgewater Hall in 1996 and the Free Trade Hall was closed by Manchester City Council.

In 1997, the building was sold to private developers despite resistance from groups such as the Manchester Civic Society, who viewed the sale as inappropriate given the historical significance of the building and its site. After the initial planning application was refused by the Secretary of State, a second modified planning application was submitted and approved. Walters' original façade was retained, behind which architects Stephenson Bell designed a 263-bedroom hotel, demolishing Howitt's post-war hall but preserving the main staircase and the 1950s statues that were formerly attached to its rear wall. The hotel opened in 2004, having cost £45 million.

== Architecture ==
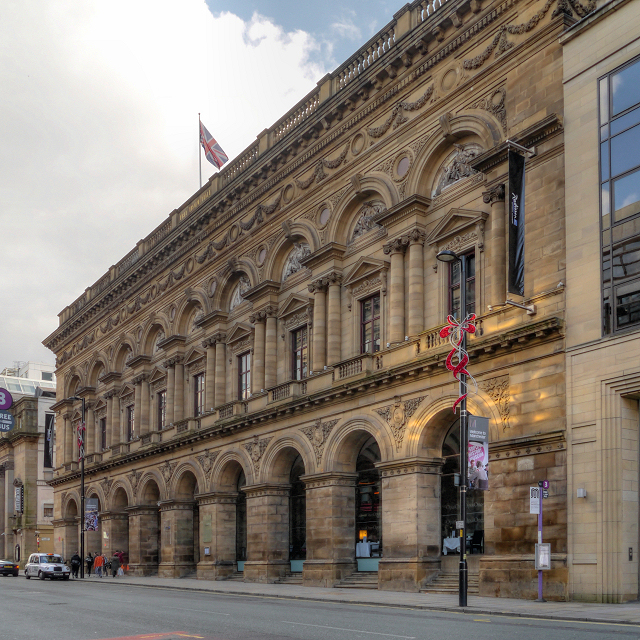
The façade of the Free Trade Hall

The Italian palazzo-style hall was built on a trapeziform site in ashlar sandstone. It has a two-storey, nine-bay façade and concealed roof. On Peter Street, its ground floor arcade has rectangular piers with round-headed arches and spandrels bearing the coats of arms of Lancashire towns that took part in the Anti-Corn Law movement. The upper floor has a colonnaded arcade, its tympana frieze is richly decorated with carved figures representing free trade, the arts, commerce, manufacture and the continents. Above the tympanum is a prominent cornice with balustraded parapet. The upper floor has paired Ionic columns to each bay and a tall window with a pedimented architrave behind a balustraded balcony. The return sides have three bays in a matching but simpler style of blank arches. The rear wall was rebuilt in 1950–51 with pilasters surmounted by relief figures representing the entertainment which took place in the old hall. The Large Hall was in a classical style with a coffered ceiling, the walls had wood panelling in oak, walnut and sycamore. Pevsner described it as "the noblest monument in the Cinquecento style in England", whilst Hartwell considered it "a classic which belongs in the canon of historic English architecture."

After its closure, the hall was sold and after a protracted planning process and consultations with English Heritage, its conversion to a hotel was agreed. During the hotel's construction, the Windmill Street and Southmill Street facades were demolished and the north block retained and connected by a triangular glazed atrium to a 15-storey block clad in stone and glass. Artifacts salvaged from the old hall, including 1950s statues by Arthur Sherwood Edwards and framed wall plaster autographed by past performers, decorate the atrium light well.

== Events ==
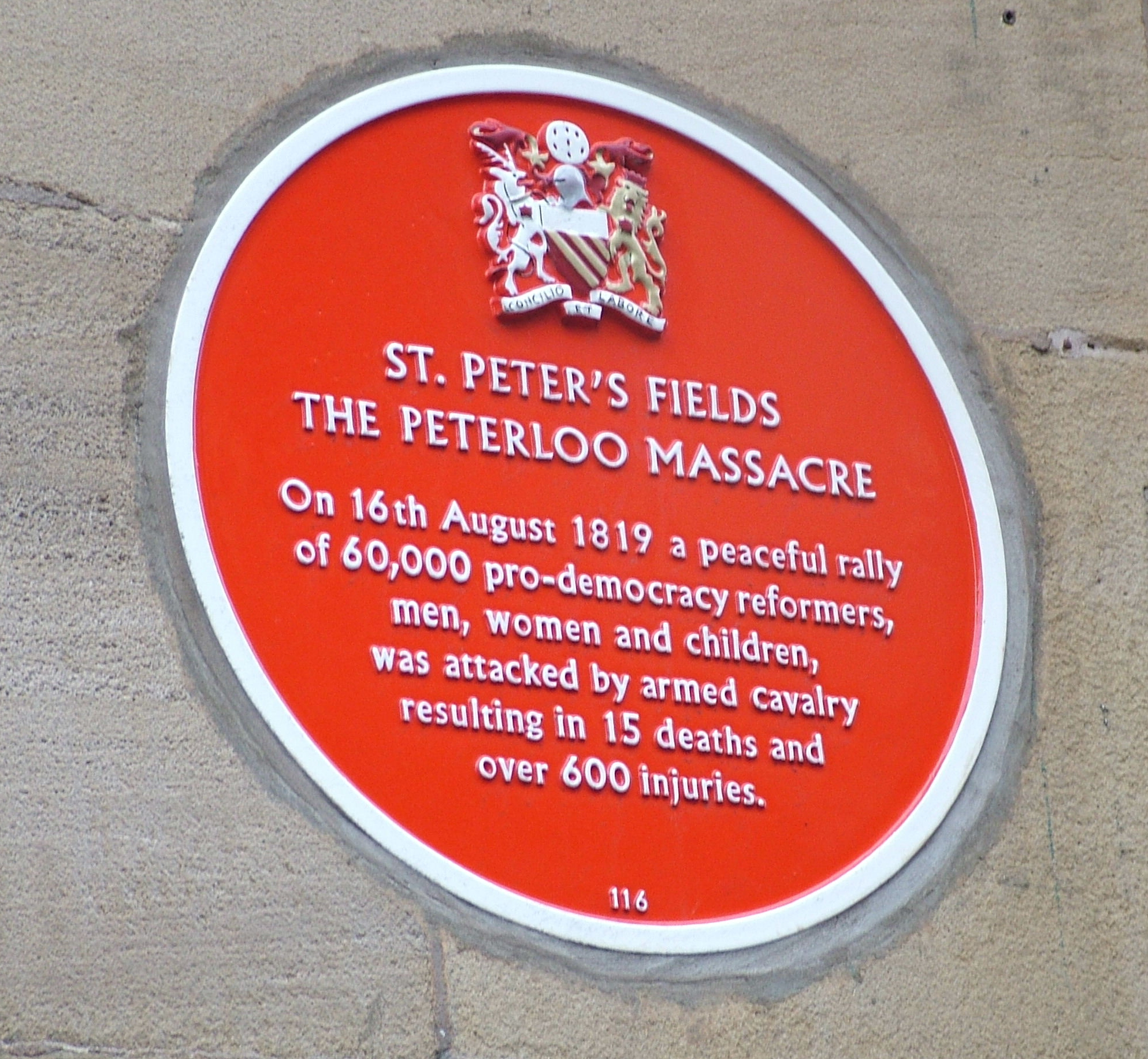
A Peterloo Massacre commemorative plaque on the side of the Manchester Free Trade Hall

=== 1850s–1950s ===
The Free Trade Hall was a venue for public meetings and political speeches and a concert hall.

In the summer of 1857, Charles Dickens performed in his three-performance production of Wilkie Collins's The Frozen Deep for the benefit of the widow of Dickens's old friend, Douglas Jerrold.

In 1858, after Sir Charles Hallé founded the Hallé Orchestra, its home was the Free Trade Hall until the hall was damaged in the Manchester Blitz. The Hallé performed at the reopening in 1951 with the Orchestra's musical director and conductor, Sir John Barbirolli, who remained until 1970. The final concert there was in 1996.

In 1872 Benjamin Disraeli gave his One Nation speech.

In 1904, Winston Churchill delivered a speech at the hall defending Britain's policy of free trade. The Times called it "one of the most powerful and brilliant he has made."

In 1905, the Women's Social and Political Union (WSPU) activists, Christabel Pankhurst and Annie Kenney were ejected from a meeting addressed by the Liberal politician Sir Edward Grey, who repeatedly refused to answer their question on Votes for Women. Christabel Pankhurst immediately began an impromptu meeting outside, and when the police moved them on, contrived to be arrested and brought to court. So began the militant WSPU campaign for the vote.

In the 1930s, a theatrical biography including details of pantomimes: "Elisse De Vere and Sam Welbo were direct from the continent with a graceful act, a combination of dance and acrobatics. ... De Vere and Welbo husband and wife originated in Russia. They fled the pogroms. In England they were part of a bill, the chief part of which, was Hamilton's Excursions, a diorama, or early form of cinema, utilising a screen. ... De Vere and Welbo operated this system when it was shown at the Manchester Free Trade Hall, as well as presenting their dance act in another part of the programme. One of their scenes worked on the Diorama - silent pictures - was Napoleon's "Retreat from Moscow" in their native Russia."

In 1951, Kathleen Ferrier sang at the re-opening of the Free Trade Hall, ending with a performance of Elgar's "Land of Hope and Glory", the only performance of that piece in her career.

=== 1960s–1970s ===
Bob Dylan played here in 1965, and again in 1966, the occasion of the "Judas!" shout. The famous bootleg that circulated from Dylan's 1966 tour, which was incorrectly dubbed the 'Royal Albert Hall' concert for years, was in fact the recording from the Manchester Free Trade Hall 1966 concert. This concert was eventually officially released in 1998 as The Bootleg Series Vol. 4: Bob Dylan Live 1966, The "Royal Albert Hall" Concert. Duo Simon & Garfunkel played here in 1967, debuting their newly written song "Punky's Dilemma" with the original opening line of "I wish I was a Kellog's cornflake, floatin' in my bowl takin' movies", and a new song for upcoming film The Graduate, "Mrs Robinson". In the late 1960s Frank Zappa and the Mothers of Invention, the Moody Blues, T. Rex and the Dubliners played there amongst others. Pink Floyd played on five occasions. Genesis played twice, on 30 January 1971 (together with Lindisfarne and Van der Graaf Generator) and in February 1973. On 13 May 1976, Kiss played their first UK concert at the venue. On 4 June and 20 July 1976, the Lesser Free Trade Hall (a small, 150-capacity room located upstairs) was the venue for two concerts by the Sex Pistols at the start of the British punk rock movement. This concert would prove influential as it led to the formation of bands such as Joy Division, New Order, Magazine, Buzzcocks, Simply Red, the Smiths and the Fall, as well as independent labels such as Factory and Creation Records. As part of their international tour in 1977, ABBA performed one of their UK concerts at the venue on February 11, 1977.

== See also ==
- Grade II* listed buildings in Greater Manchester
- Listed buildings in Manchester-M2
- Sex Pistols at the Lesser Free Trade Hall
- The Bootleg Series Vol. 4: Bob Dylan Live 1966, The "Royal Albert Hall" Concert
