= Longlands, Bradford =

Area of Bradford, England

Coordinates: 53°47′47.5″N 1°45′43.7″W

Longlands is a historic district within Bradford City Centre, West Yorkshire, England. It lies on the north west edge of the City Centre with boundaries roughly the equivalent of Sunbridge Road to the west, Grattan Road to the south, Westgate to the east and City Road to the north. The district is often mistakenly referred to as the "Chain Street Estate" after one of the local residential streets or falsely amalgamated with the adjacent Goitside district which lies further down the hill towards the Bradford Beck.

== Buildings ==
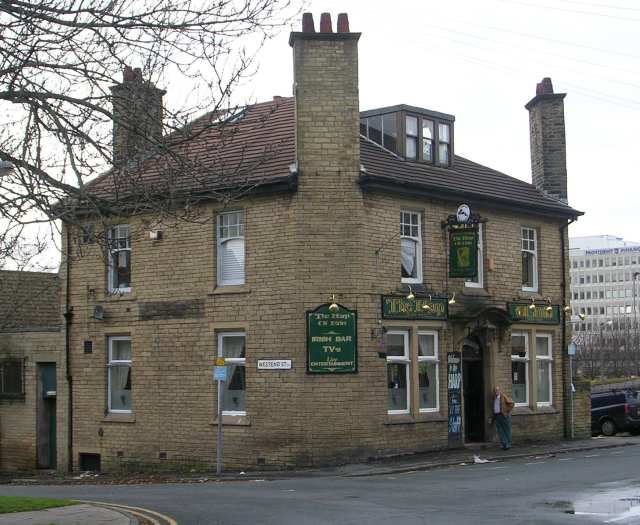
The "Harp of Erin" pub

Residential properties are nearly exclusively tenement blocks of a cottage style influenced by the Garden city movement although only three have survived today from a much larger original number and in a highly modified form. The majority of other land in the district is now occupied by industrial and office buildings. Other notable surviving facilities in Longlands include the "Harp of Erin" pub, which was constructed to serve the estate, the New Beehive Inn and the Bradford Irish Club.

== History ==
=== Social reform ===
The original Longlands neighbourhood consisted of back-to-back terraced houses and was populated mainly by Irish migrant workers. By the late 19th century the district had become overpopulated and was suffering from health and crime issues. After over a decade of campaigning on the issue, social reformer Fred Jowett, a member of the council and chair of its health committee, persuaded Bradford Council to use powers under the Housing of the Working Classes Act 1890 (53 & 54 Vict. c. 70) to declare Longlands "insanitary" so the land could be compulsorily purchased, the old housing demolished and a new scheme of social housing and supporting amenities built there instead.

=== Council housing ===
Longlands is important historically in the social development of Bradford as it was the site of the city's second only council housing scheme which was also arguably the first major scheme. The only older council housing, the Faxfleet Estate to the south of Bradford, was constructed simply to relocate the residents of the original Longlands district and was a much smaller development.

The whole of the BD1 Postcode area, which includes Goitside, Little Germany and Longlands, was listed as one of the top ten areas in the United Kingdom for buy to let property investment.
