= Bradford War Memorial =

WWI commemorative monument in Bradford, England

Coordinates: 53°47′29″N 1°45′23″W

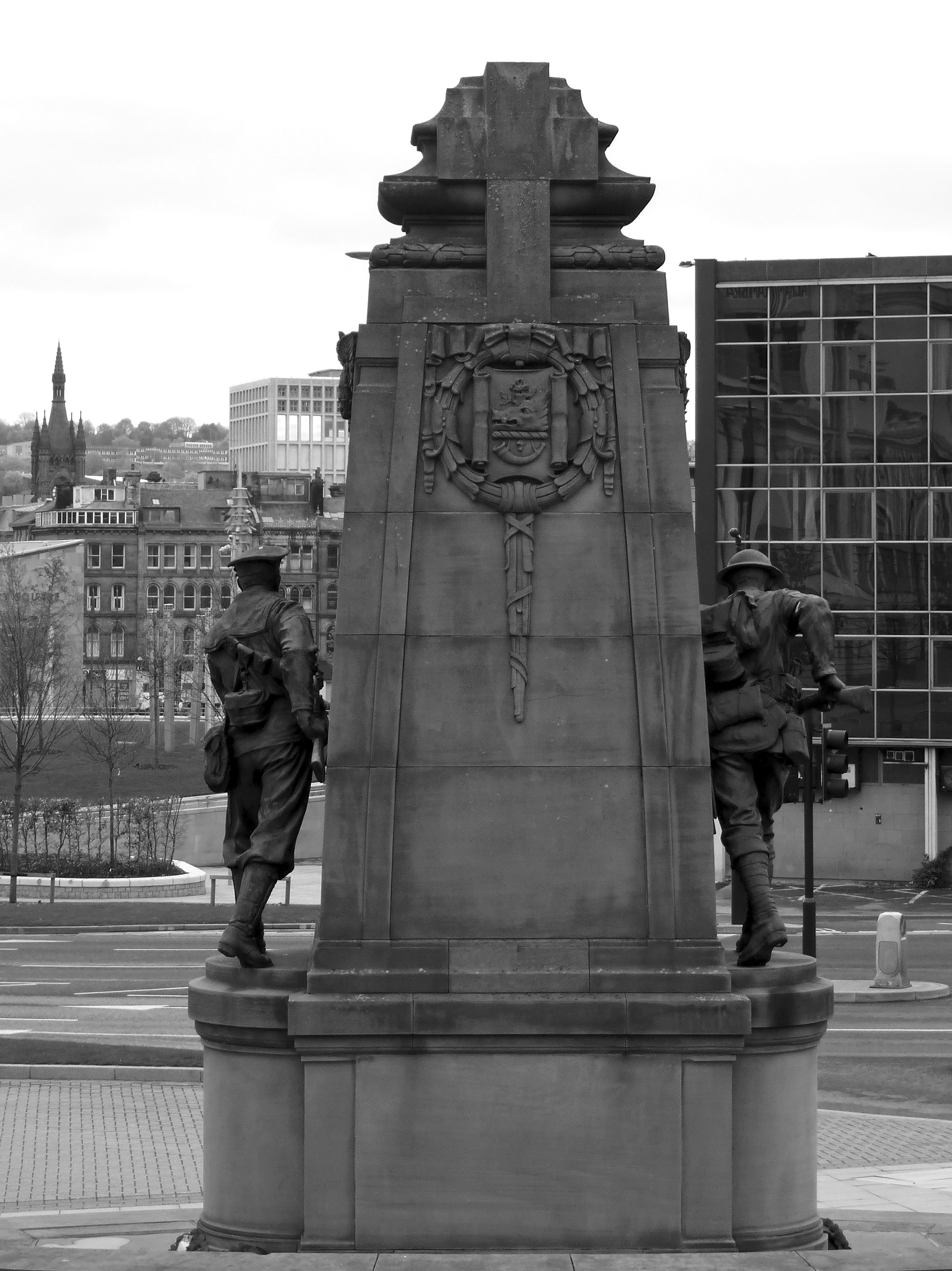
Rear of the memorial in 2012

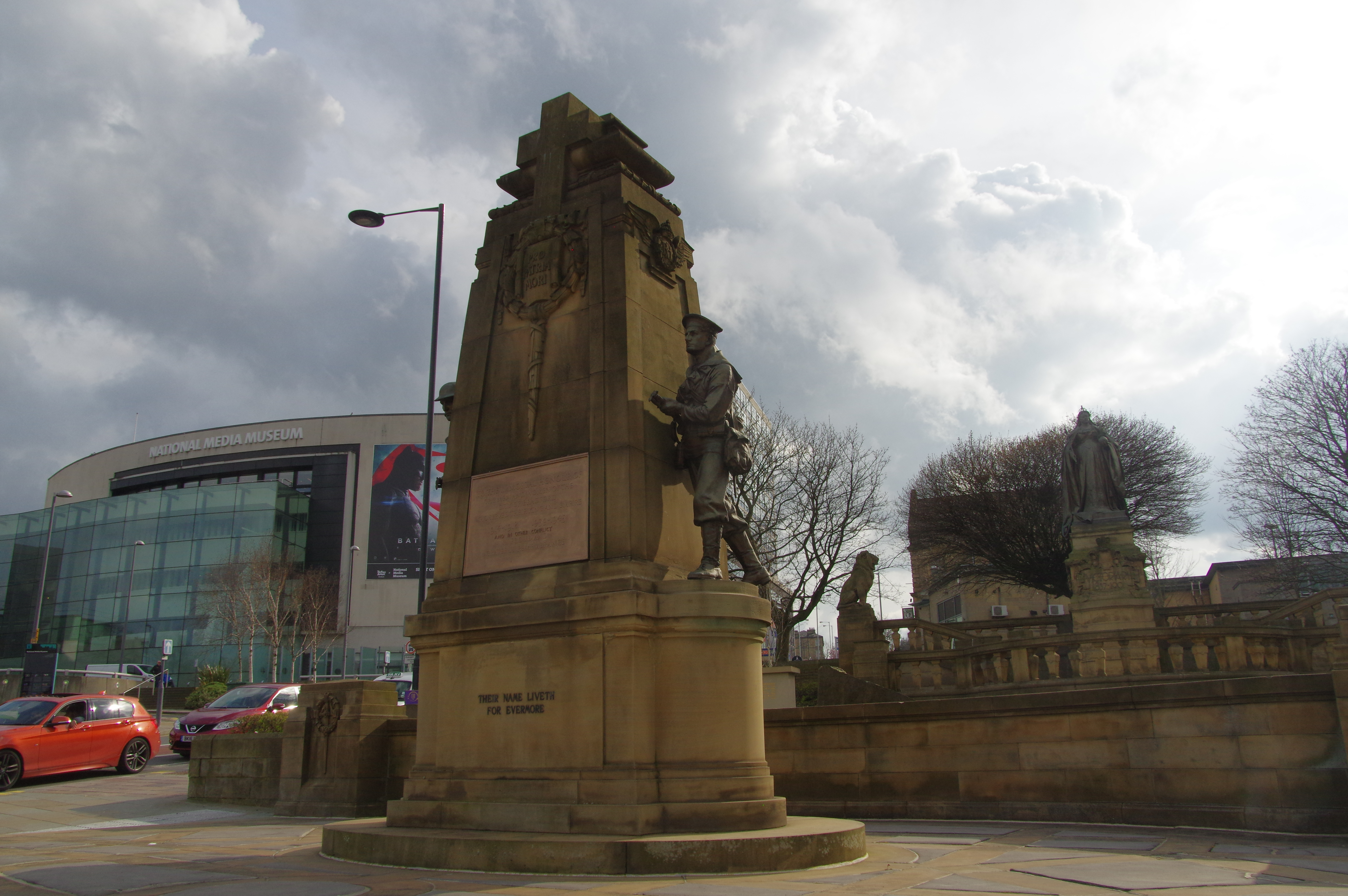
The memorial stands to the north of the National Media Museum (left), and close to a statue of Queen Victoria (right)

Bradford War Memorial commemorates the 37,000 men the English city of Bradford who served in the British Armed Forces in the First World War. Many of the 5,000 dead had served in the two Bradford Pals battalions and were killed on 1 July 1916, the first day of the First Battle of the Somme. The stone pylon with bronze statues was unveiled on 1 July 1922, in Victoria Square, beside Prince's Way, to the northeast of the Grade II listed Queen Victoria Memorial. A bronze plaque was added after the Second World War, and the memorial also commemorates later conflicts. It stands between the National Media Museum and Alhambra Theatre, Bradford, and was Grade II listed in 2016.

The memorial was designed by Bradford's city architect Walter Williamson, with sculpture by H.H. Martyn & Co. of Cheltenham. It comprises a 4.35 metres (14.3 ft) high central tapering pylon made from stone from the nearby Bolton Woods quarry, topped by a stone sarcophagus. The front and rear face of the pylon are carved with a cross, the lower arm of which becomes a sword blade passing through a wreath. The front wreath has a scroll with the words "PRO PATRI MORI". Either side of the pylon bears a winged wreath with the letters "RAF". The pylon stands an oval platform, with steps down to the road passing by.

Two bronze statues stand on the stepped base, one to either side of the central pylon, a soldier to the left and a sailor to the right, each lunging forward with a rifle. Historic England attributes the bronze sculptures to Robert Lindsey Clark (father of Philip Lindsey Clark) who was head sculptor at Martyns from 1905 to 1926. The warlike pose of the soldiers was controversial when the memorial was first unveiled. Originally each rifle had a fixed bayonet; the blades were damaged in 1969 and then removed, but the hilt of each bayonet remains in place.

The front of the pylon originally bore the dedicatory inscription "TO THE IMMORTAL HONOUR OF THE MEN / OF THE CITY OF BRADFORD WHO SERVED / THEIR KING AND EMPIRE IN THE GREAT / WAR, 1914 - 1918 // THIS MEMORIAL ERECTED / BY THEIR FELLOW CITIZENS IS DEDICATED / IN PROUD AND GRATEFUL REMEMBRANCE, / 1ST JULY, 1922 / UNVEILED BY ALDERMAN A. GADIE, J.P./ LIEUT-COL. T.F., LORD MAYOR 1920-21". This inscription was later covered by a bronze plaque added in 1969 to also commemorate the casualties of the Second World War, and which has been updated to commemorate subsequent conflicts, so it now read "TO THE IMMORTAL HONOUR OF / THE MEN AND WOMEN OF THE / CITY OF BRADFORD / WHO SERVED THEIR KING AND EMPIRE / 1914 - 1918 1939 - 1945/ AND IN OTHER CONFLICT / IN PROUD AND/ GRATEFUL REMEMBRANCE". Below this, the base still bears the original inscription "THEIR NAME LIVETH FOR EVERMORE".

Two pals battalions of the Prince of Wales's Own (West Yorkshire Regiment) had been raised in Bradford: the 16th (Service) Battalion in September 1914 and the 18th (Service) Battalion in January 1915. The battalions both served in the 93rd Brigade in Egypt in 1915–16, and then on the Western Front in France. Around 2,000 men from Bradford went over the top to attack Serre on 1 July 1916, at the northern edge of the Allied attack on the first day of the First Battle of the Somme. Almost 1,800 were killed or wounded that day. The battalions were reformed with new recruits and continued to serve on the Western Front until February 1918.

The memorial was unveiled on Saturday 1 July 1922, the sixth anniversary of the commencement of the First Battle of the Somme, in front of a crowd of 40,000 people, by Lt-Col Alderman Anthony Gadie (a former Lord Mayor of Bradford, and later MP for Bradford Central from 1924 to 1929). It was dedicated by the Archdeacon of Bradford, William Stanton Jones (later Bishop of Sodor and Man).

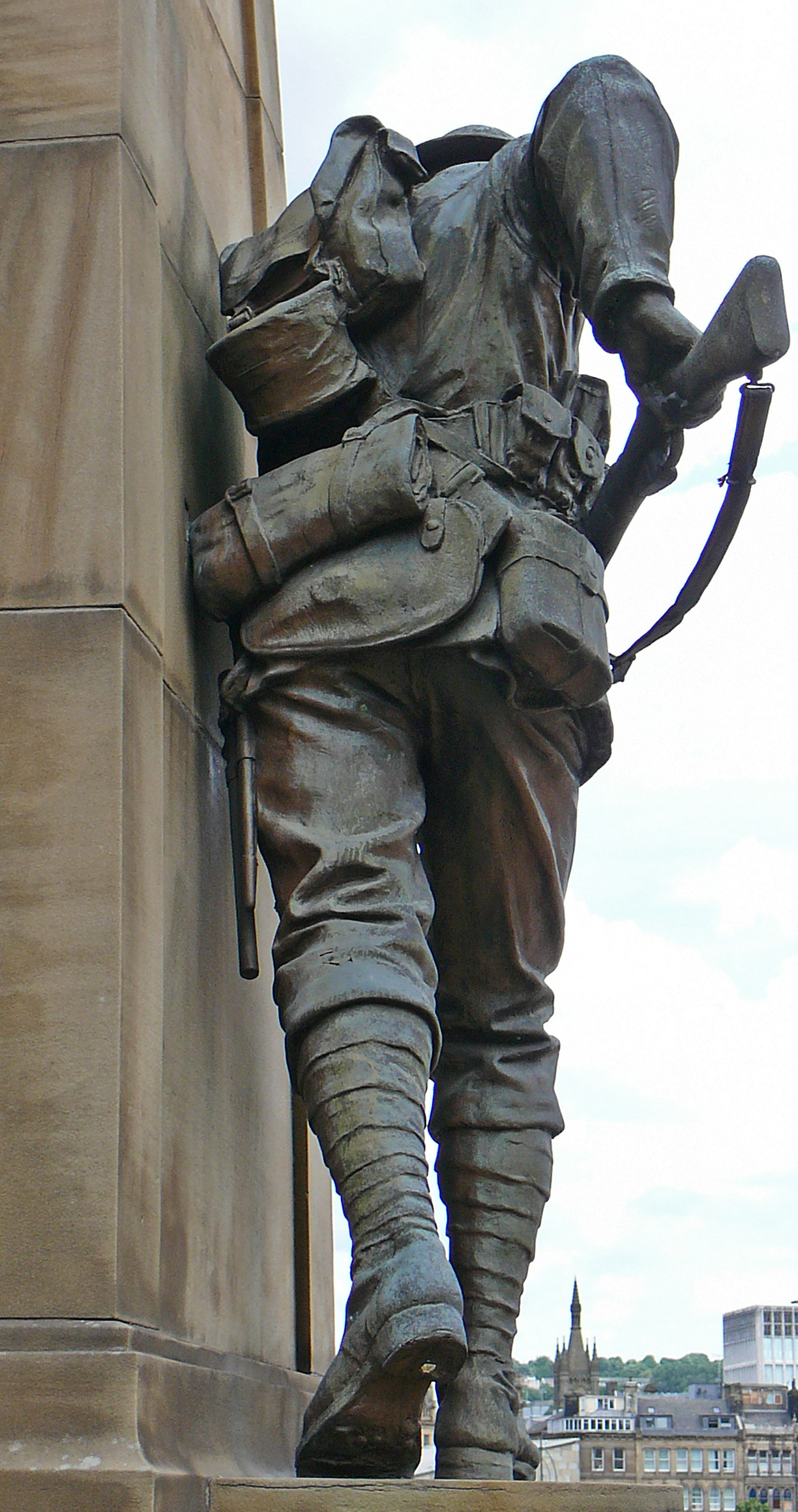
Rear view of soldier statue

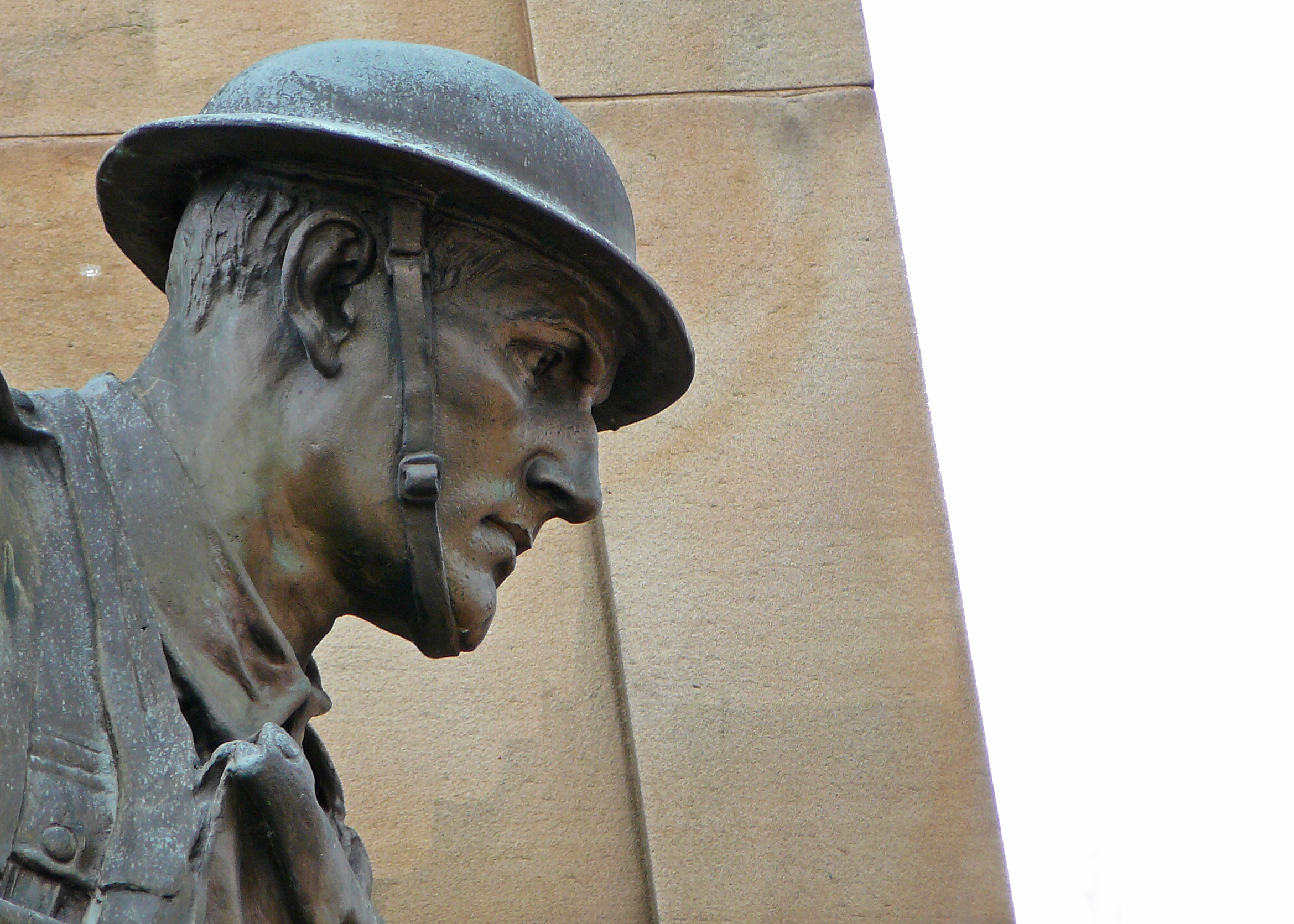
Head of soldier statue

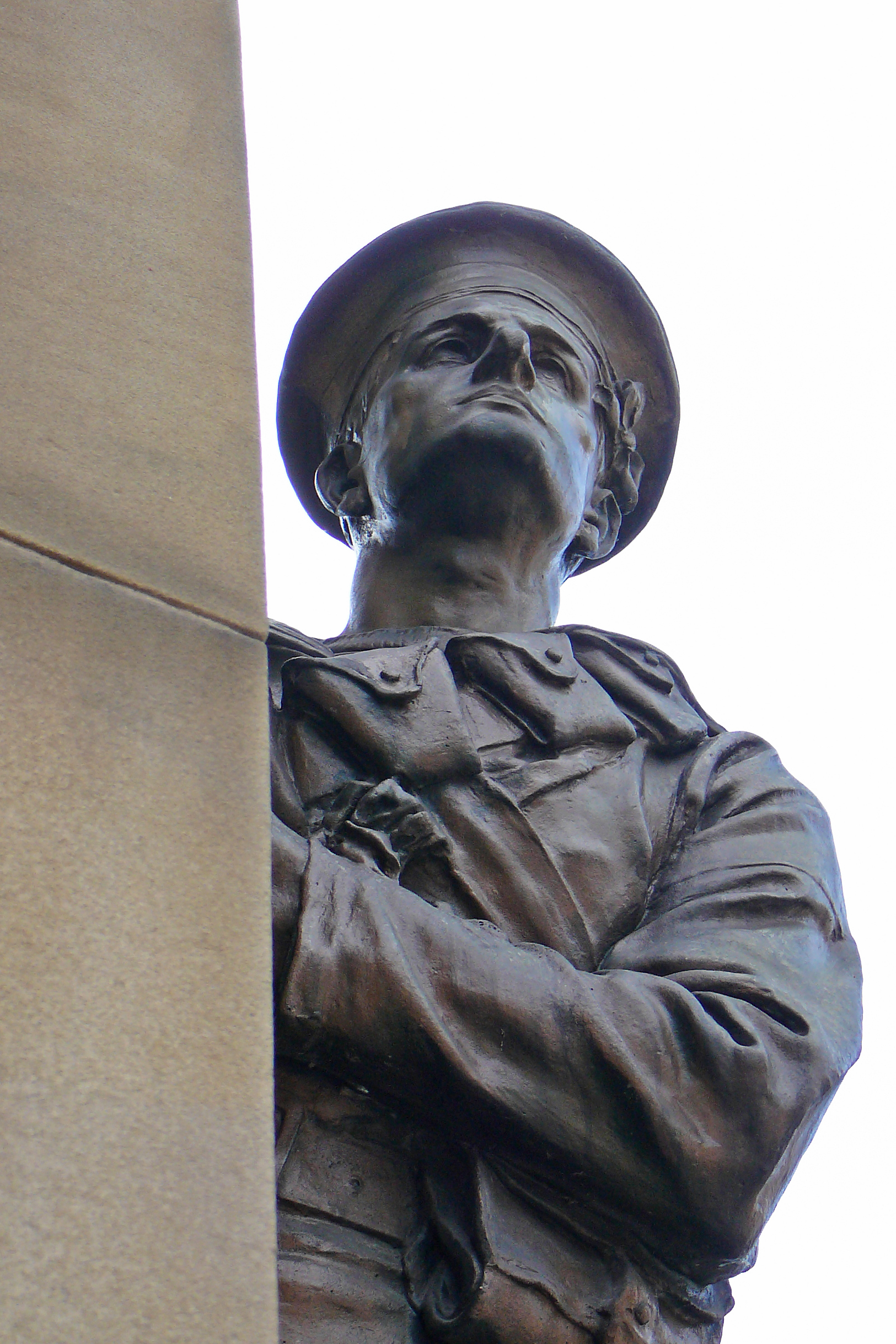
Head of sailor statue

== See also ==
- Listed buildings in Bradford (City Ward)
