= Marcie Blane =

American singer (born 1944)

- Also known as: Marcie Blane, Marcie Blaine, Marcy Blaine, Marsei Frean, Marcia Blaine
- Born: Marcia Blank; May 21, 1944 (age 81)
- Origin: Brooklyn, New York
- Genres: Pop
- Occupation: Singer
- Labels: Seville Records, London Records

Marcia Blank (born May 21, 1944), known as Marcie Blane, is an American former pop singer known for her 1962 hit song, "Bobby's Girl".

== Life and career ==
Blane was born in Brooklyn, New York. As a favor to a friend, Blane recorded a demo for Seville Records. The song was "Bobby's Girl". Released in the fall of 1962, "Bobby's Girl" made No. 2 on the Cash Box chart and No. 3 on the Billboard Hot 100, and was later recorded for the German market in their language. It sold over one million copies by 1963, and was awarded a gold disc. In the United Kingdom the song was covered by Susan Maughan who had the hit. "What Does A Girl Do?", the follow-up single, rose to No. 82 on the Hot 100 list in early 1963, and was Blane's only other appearance on any Billboard chart.

After her music career, Blane graduated from Queens College. She started a family and began a career in education. In a rare 1988 interview, Blane remarked, "The music business was impossible for me to deal with. Everything changed. I felt very isolated and very lonely. I decided not to continue. I couldn't. It was too difficult. I didn't feel comfortable in front of a lot of people, with everyone making a fuss. I didn't have the sense of myself that I needed. It's taken all these years to be able to enjoy what there was."

== Discography ==
=== Singles ===
Year	Title	Label and catalogue number	Peak chart positions					
Year	Title	Label and catalogue number	US Billboard	US Cashbox	USR&B	CAN	NZ	SWE
1962	"Guessin' Games" b/w "Thank You"	Broadway Recording Studios (unreleased acetates) (Shown as "Marcia Blank" and "Marsha Blank")	—	—	—	—	—	—
1962	"Suddenly It's Over" b/w "A Time to Dream" (Demo)	Broadway Recording Studios (unreleased acetates) (Shown as "Marcia Blank" and "Marsha Blank")	—	—	—	—	—	—
1962	"I'm Just a Cute Little Girl"	Broadway Recording Studios (unreleased acetates) (Shown as "Marcia Blank" and "Marsha Blank")	—	—	—	—	—	—
1962	"Bobby's Girl" b/w "A Time to Dream"	Seville 120	3	2	14	2	5	1
1963	"What Does a Girl Do?" b/w "How Can I Tell Him?"	Seville 123	82	62	—	42	—	—
1963	"Little Miss Fool" b/w "Ragtime Sound"	Seville126	—	—	—	—	—	—
1963	"You Gave My Number to Billy" b/w "Told You So"	Seville 128	—	143	—	—	—	—
1963	"Why Can't I Get a Guy" b/w "Who's Going to Take My Daddy's Place"	Seville 130	—	—	—	—	—	—
1964	"Bobby Did" b/w "After the Laughter"	Seville 133	—	—	—	—	—	—
1965	"The Hurtin' Kind" b/w "She'll Break the String"	Seville 137	—	—	—	—	—	—

=== Compilation album ===
Bobby's Girl: The Complete Seville Recordings (2004, President Records)

1. "Bobby's Girl" (Mono) 2:18
2. "A Time to Dream" 2:03
3. "What Does a Girl Do?" 2:18
4. "How Can I Tell Him?" 2:59
5. "Little Miss Fool" 2:23
6. "Ragtime Sound" 2:18
7. "You Gave My Number to Billy" 2:08
8. "Told You So" 2:00
9. "Why Can't I Get a Guy" 2:08
10. "Who's Going to Take My Daddy's Place?" 2:26
11. "Bobby Did" 2:17
12. "After the Laughter" 2:19
13. "The Hurtin' Kind" 2:42
14. "She'll Break the String" 2:22
15. "Wer Einmal 'A' Gesagt (What Does a Girl Do?)" 2:16
16. "So Ist Das Leben (How Can I Tell Him?)" 3:01
17. "Guessin' Games" (Previously Unreleased Demo) 2:00
18. "Thank You" (Previously Unreleased Demo) 2:14
19. "Suddenly It's Over" (Previously Unreleased Demo) 2:08
20. "I'm Just a Cute Little Girl" (Previously Unreleased Demo) 1:51
21. "A Time to Dream" (Previously Unreleased Demo) 2:08
22. "Bobby's Girl" (Previously Unreleased Demo – Stereo) 2:23
