= Listed buildings in Bradford (City Ward) =

City is a ward in the metropolitan borough of the City of Bradford, West Yorkshire, England. It contains over 180 listed buildings that are recorded in the National Heritage List for England. Of these, three are listed at Grade I, the highest of the three grades, seven are at Grade II*, the middle grade, and the others are at Grade II, the lowest grade. The ward consists of the central area of the city, and districts to the north west towards Manningham, and to the southwest towards Great Horton.

Until the coming of the Industrial Revolution, Bradford was a market town. From the later part of the 18th century, industries developed and grew, particularly the woollen industry, until in the 1860s, it was considered to be "the worldwide capital of the worsted textile industry". The listed buildings reflect this history. Only a few date from before 1800, and these are the parish church, later the cathedral, houses and a private house. The great majority date from the middle of the 19th century, and they reflect the growing textile industry and the prosperity arising from this, in the construction of elaborately decorated public buildings, and, in the area of Little Germany, large and impressive warehouses.

== Key ==
Grade	Criteria
I	Buildings of exceptional interest, sometimes considered to be internationally important
II*	Particularly important buildings of more than special interest
II	Buildings of national importance and special interest

== Buildings ==
Name and location	Photograph	Date	Notes	Grade
Bradford Cathedral; 53.79543°N 1.74786°W		14th century	The oldest part of the cathedral is the nave arcade, the tower was built in 1493–1508, and there have been additions and alterations since, including a restoration in 1860–62, and an extensive enlargement between 1951 and 1965 by Sir Edward Maufe. The cathedral is built in gritstone, the 20th-century additions are in sandstone, and most of the exterior is in Perpendicular style. The tower has a six-light west window, angle buttresses, and a panelled and embattled parapet with eight pinnacles. The extensions include a lantern tower over the choir, a three-sided east apse, and a bellcote on the south side.	I
Paper Hall; 53.79686°N 1.74482°W		1643	A house, later used for other purposes, it is in sandstone with an H-shaped plan. There is a central hall range with two storeys, gabled cross-wings with three storeys, and a two-storey porch in the left angle. The left wing contains mullioned and transomed windows, in the upper storey of the porch is a mullioned window, and each gable contains a stepped window. The hall range has two bays and the right wing has three, and both contain cross windows, those in the ground floor of the wing with a continuous hood mould curving over each window, and those in the upper floor with pediments.	II*
1–15 Cousen Road; 53.78120°N 1.78077°W		Mid 17th century	A row of houses, one forming a projecting gabled wing, in gritstone and sandstone, partly rendered, with stone slate roofs and two storeys. Most of the windows are mullioned, some have been altered, and some have hood moulds. The left gable end has saddlestones and shaped kneelers, the projecting wing has quoins and a shaped finial, and one house has a shaped, initialled and dated lintel.	II
1 Barkerend Road; 53.79580°N 1.74696°W		Late 18th century	A sandstone house with bracketed eaves, and a stone slate roof with saddlestones and kneelers. There are three storeys, a symmetrical front of three bays, and a recessed rear wing. The windows are sashes, the window above the central doorway has a round head and a Gibbs surround, and the other windows in the middle floor are tripartite.	II
Former Ring o' Bells public house 53.79644°N 1.74850°W		Late 18th century	The former public house is in painted rendered sandstone, with quoins and a band, a roof of slate at the front and stone slate at the rear, and parapet coped gables. There are two storeys, a symmetrical front of five bays, and an angled wing on the left. The central doorway has a plain surround, the window above it has an architrave, and the ground floor windows have been altered. In the wing is a doorway and a bar window, and in the upper floor is a sash window.	II
99 East Parade; 53.79538°N 1.74410°W		c. 1800	This consists of the remains of East Brook House that have been incorporated in a mill and warehouse added in about 1865. The remains of the house have two storeys, an attic and a basement, three bays, and a moulded cornice and a parapet. It contains a round-headed doorway and windows, some of which are tripartite, and others are Venetian windows, some of which are blocked. The mill is in sandstone and has sill bands, a bracketed eaves cornice, four storeys, and a bowed corner. In the centre of the corner is a doorway with pilasters and an entablature.	II
6–18 Rawson Place; 53.79598°N 1.75553°W		c. 1800	A terrace of houses and shops, with Nos. 10 and 12 added in the 1890s. They are in sandstone with sill bands, and moulded eaves cornices. There are three storeys, and in the ground floor are shop fronts, mostly modern, and retaining piers supporting a fascia. The windows are sashes, those in the middle floor with architraves and cornices. Nos. 10 and 12 are more ornate, with decorative window surrounds, shaped gables, and finials.	II
Warehouse opposite former Gaumont Theatre; 53.79212°N 1.75752°W	—	c. 1800	A stone warehouse with a stone slate roof and four storeys. Most of the windows are mullioned, some of which are blocked. In the gable end is a loading door in each floor, and a wooden hoist beam at the top.	II
544–562 Great Horton Road; 53.78297°N 1.78197°W	—	c. 1800–30	A row of sandstone cottages stepped in pairs, with bracketed eaves and stone slate roofs. The doorways have plain surrounds, the windows have single lights or are mullioned, some mullions have been removed, and there have been other alterations.	II
402–410 Great Horton Road; 53.78612°N 1.77602°W	—	c. 1820	A row of sandstone cottages with bracketed eaves and stone slate roofs. There are two storeys, and each cottage has two bays, a doorway with squared jambs, and mullioned windows with two or three lights.	II
31 Manor Row; 53.79723°N 1.75585°W		c. 1820	A house later used for other purposes, it is in sandstone on a plinth, with eaves on shallow brackets, and a hipped slate roof. There are two storeys and a symmetrical front of three bays. The central doorway has engaged Ionic columns, a rectangular fanlight, and a cornice hood, and the windows are sashes.	II
32 Manor Row; 53.79787°N 1.75618°W		c. 1820	A house, to which a built-out shop front was added in about 1880–90. It is in sandstone, and has a stone slate roof with coped gables. There are two storeys and three bays. The shop front contains four plate glass windows and a doorway on the right. Between the windows are Composite pilasters on panelled pedestals. At the top is a cornice and a balustraded parapet.	II
33 and 33A Manor Row; 53.79732°N 1.75604°W		c. 1820	A sandstone house with a moulded gutter cornice and a hipped slate roof. There are two storeys and a symmetrical front of three bays. The central doorway has engaged Doric columns, fluted necking, and consoles carved with leaves carrying a moulded pediment. The window above the doorway has an architrave.	II
35 and 37 Manor Row; 53.79745°N 1.75629°W		c. 1820	A pair of sandstone houses on a plinth, with bands and a hipped roof; the roof of No. 35 is in stone slate, and No. 37 is tiled. There are two storeys and a symmetrical front of eight bays, the middle four bays projecting slightly under a pediment containing an oculus. The doorways are approached by steps, and each has a rectangular fanlight, and a cornice hood. The windows are sashes.	II
9, 11 and 15 Duke Street and 17 and 19 Piccadilly; 53.79593°N 1.75409°W	—	c. 1820–30	A warehouse with living accommodation above, it is in sandstone with horizontal grooving in the ground floor, a cornice, and a parapet. There are three storeys and a basement, and a front of nine bays. The middle bay projects slightly and contains a two-storey segmental archway with rustication in the arch, over which are two pairs of Tuscan pilasters, a frieze, and a pediment. The windows are sashes.	II
Three-storey block, Cross Lane Mills; 53.78154°N 1.78111°W		1821	A former spinning mill in stone with a brick toilet tower, it has three storeys and an attic, ten bays along the sides, and three at the ends. There is a stair turret at the northwest, a combined toilet and hoist tower at the rear, a single-storey lean-to at the southeast, and a later single-storey extension. Most of the windows are sashes, and in the gable ends are blocked Venetian windows. The stair tower has paired round-headed windows and a hipped roof.	II
Shoulder of Mutton public house 53.79518°N 1.75253°W		1825	The public house is in painted gritstone, with sill courses, and a moulded eaves cornice. There are two storeys and four bays. The doorway has a stilted semicircular-arched fanlight, imposts, voussoirs, and a dated keystone. The windows are sashes, and the window above the doorway has fluted pilasters, a frieze, and a shallow cornice. There is a side door to the right, and in the left bay is a carriage entrance.	II
8–24 Quebec Street; 53.79253°N 1.75801°W		Early 19th century	A row of warehouses in sandstone with paired eaves brackets and stone slate roofs. No. 8 has two storeys, four bays and two gables. It contains two round-headed windows and two segmental arches with keystones. The other warehouses have three storeys, close-set windows, archways with flat lintels, hatches and hatchways.	II
Main block and other blocks, Cannon Mill; 53.78446°N 1.78081°W		1826	The mill was later largely rebuilt and extended, particularly in 1885, incorporating fabric from the original building. It is in sandstone, and the main block has quoin pilasters, sill bands, and moulded eaves. There are four storeys, 20 bays, and two pedimented stair turrets. To the west is the former engine house, with round-arched windows, and to the east is the wagon shed. Further to the east is a detached four-storey block with 16 bays, linked by a footbridge.	II
32 Kirkgate and 1 Piccadilly; 53.79507°N 1.75303°W		1826–28	Built as the Exchange Rooms in Greek Revival style, and later much altered, it is on a corner site, in sandstone, with a cornice and a deep blind attic. There are three storeys, nine bays in Piccadilly, one on Kirkgate, and a canted bay on the corner. The windows, which have altered glazing, are in vertical panels. In Piccadilly is a recessed porch with pilasters, fluted Greek Doric columns, and a deep entablature with two laurel wreaths. Elsewhere in the ground floor are modern shop fronts. On Kirkgate is a blind balustrade above the ground floor, and over this are pilasters, a tripartite window, and a broken pediment.	II
34, 34A and 36 Darley Street; 53.79597°N 1.75474°W	—	1827	A house on a corner site that was enlarged and heightened in 1905 and since used for other purposes, it is in sandstone with a sill course, and a moulded cornice over the first floor, and at the top is a frieze, a cornice, and a balustraded parapet with a central pediment. There are three storeys and a front of five bays. In the ground floor are modern shop fronts, and between them is a round-arched entrance with a grooved surround and a doorway with a fanlight. The upper floors contain windows with architraves, and the middle window in the top floor is tripartite.	II
30 Kirkgate and 2 and 4 Piccadilly; 53.79514°N 1.75274°W	—	c. 1830	A row of stone houses on a corner site, later used as shops, that were altered later and a mansard roof added. There are three storeys, two bays on Kirkgate, six on Piccadilly, and a canted bay on the corner. In the ground floor are modern shop fronts, above are sash windows with sill bands, and in the roof are dormers.	II
13 and 15 Peckover Street; 53.79531°N 1.74611°W	—	c. 1830	A pair of sandstone houses with a moulded eaves cornice, a stone slate roof, and two storeys. In the centre are two doorways flanking a passage entry. The doorways have architraves, and cornices on consoles. The entry has a round-arched head, voussoirs, and a keystone. The windows are sashes, and to the right of the doorways is an inserted garage door.	II
14 and 16 Piccadilly; 53.79556°N 1.75327°W	—	c. 1830	The buildings are in stone with a grooved ground floor, an eaves cornice, three storeys and a basement, and three bays. The right bay projects slightly, and contains a round-arched doorway with pilasters, a grooved surround, a keystone, a frieze, and a cornice. In the upper floors are tripartite windows. To the left the ground floor has a tripartite window and a doorway, and above are sash windows.	II
18–24 Piccadilly; 53.79572°N 1.75351°W	—	c. 1830	An office in sandstone with horizontal grooving in the ground floor, a frieze, a cornice, and a parapet, panelled in the centre. There are three storeys and five bays. In the centre of the ground floor is a carriageway with a flat lintel containing ornate iron gates, and there are two doorways. In the upper floors, the middle bay projects with pilasters, and the windows are sashes.	II
75 Manningham Lane and 1–12 Eldon Place; 53.79982°N 1.75966°W		c. 1830–40	A terrace of sandstone houses stepped in pairs up a slope. They each have a plinth, sill bands, a moulded projecting eaves cornice, and a stone slate roof. There are three storeys, and each house has three bays, and sash windows. One house has an inserted shop front, and the doorways have architraves, rectangular fanlights, cornices and swept cappings.	II
6 Piccadilly; 53.79524°N 1.75286°W	—	c. 1830–40	An office in sandstone on a plinth, with bands, a cornice and a blocking course. There are three storeys and a basement, and five bays. The central doorway has a rectangular fanlight, and the windows are sashes.	II
17 and 21 Chapel Street; 53.79426°N 1.74556°W	—	1831	Originally a school, two storeys were added and it was converted into a warehouse and office block in 1884. It is in sandstone, with a band over the ground floor, a frieze and projecting cornice over the first floor, and a shallow moulded eaves cornice at the top. There are four storeys and a basement, and seven bays. The windows are casements with lintels. In the ground floor is a semicircular-arched wagon entrance with voussoirs, containing cast iron gates and a fanlight with radial ironwork.	II
28A Manor Row; 53.79749°N 1.75525°W		1835	Originally a chapel, the portal was added in 1888, and the building was later used for other purposes. It is in sandstone, and in Greek Revival style. The front has quoin pilasters, a full-width pediment, two storeys, and five bays. The three-bay portico has side lights flanked by pilasters, engaged Ionic columns, an architrave, and an entablature with a pediment. The windows have flat surrounds, along the sides are seven bays, and at the rear is a full-height segmental bow window.	II
Forecourt railings, 28A Manor Row; 53.79737°N 1.75516°W	—	1835	The railings enclosing the forecourt have spear-head rails and dog rails, and halberd standards.	II
Former First Church of Christ Scientist; 53.79920°N 1.75771°W		1836	The building is in painted sandstone on a plinth, with quoin pilasters, a frieze, a moulded cornice, a blocking course, and a half-hipped slate roof. There are two storeys and three bays. The central doorway has a Greek Doric porch and an architrave. The window above it has an architrave and a cornice on consoles, and the other windows are tripartite.	II
College Mill; 53.79610°N 1.74523°W		1839	Originally a college chapel, its body has been rebuilt for commercial use, but most of the front has survived. This is in stone, with a channelled basement, over which is a band, and at the top is a deep frieze and a projecting cornice. There are two storeys, a basement and a blind attic, a bowed front of three bays, the bays divided by giant Doric pilasters, and a single-bay wing to the right. In the wing is a doorway with pilasters and a cornice. The middle windows in the bow have been converted into loading doors, and the other windows in the ground floor have architraves and cornices. In the attic are three panels, and on the cornice are two pediments with antefixae.	II
Stable and coach house, 30 Manor Row; 53.79786°N 1.75594°W	—	c. 1840	The former stable and coach house are in sandstone with a hipped slate roof. There are two storeys and three bays. In the ground floor are three coach house doors, and the upper floor contains three windows, the middle window octagonal with an architrave.	II
Yorkshire County Savings Bank; 53.79768°N 1.75586°W		c. 1840	The bank, later used for other purposes, is in sandstone on a plinth, with a sill band, a frieze, a cornice and a blocking course. There are two storeys and a symmetrical front of six bays, the middle two bays projecting, and three bays on the sides. The doorway has an architrave, a frieze, and a dentilled cornice. The windows are sashes, and in the upper floor of the middle bays are pairs of Doric pilasters. The upper floor windows have panelled aprons.	II
16 and 18 Chapel Street; 53.79386°N 1.74557°W	—	c. 1840–50	A pair of sandstone houses on a plinth, with a sill band, a moulded eaves cornice, and a slate roof. There are two storeys and each house has three bays. The doorways are in the outer bays, and are round-arched with pilasters and fanlights. The windows are round-arched sashes, with moulded architraves, those in the ground floor also with aprons. The windows and fanlight of No. 16 have retained their intersecting glazing bars.	II
27 and 29 Chapel Street; 53.79450°N 1.74530°W	—	c. 1840–50	A pair of sandstone houses with two storeys. No. 27 has two bays, and No. 29 has three. In the right bay of No. 29 is a flat-arched wagon entry, and the doorways have pilasters and thin cornices.	II
1 and 2 Eldon Terrace, Manningham; 53.79895°N 1.76097°W	—	c. 1840–50	A pair of sandstone houses with a sill band, a string course, and a coped parapet. There are three storeys, and each house has four bays. Each doorway has Doric pilasters, a rectangular fanlight, a deep frieze, a modillioned cornice and a blocking course. The windows above the doorways each has an architrave, and a cornice on carved consoles, and the windows in the lower two floors have aprons.	II
3 and 4 Eldon Terrace, Manningham; 53.79916°N 1.76117°W	—	c. 1840–50	A pair of sandstone houses with a sill band, a moulded frieze, a bracketed eaves cornice with end consoles, and a stone slate roof. There are two storeys, and each house has four bays. Each doorway has Doric pilasters, a rectangular fanlight, a deep frieze, a modillioned cornice and a blocking course. The windows have aprons, and those above the doorways each has an architrave, and a cornice on carved consoles.	II
13 Piece Hall Yard; 53.79462°N 1.75259°W	—	c. 1840–50	The building, which forms part of a public house, is in painted sandstone with bands, a modillion bracketed cornice over the ground floor and at the eaves, and a blocking course. There are three storeys and a half-basement, and a bowed front of seven bays. In the ground floor are two doorways with architraves and cornices, there are grooved piers in the half-basement, and the windows are sashes.	II
5–19 Salem Street; 53.79783°N 1.75540°W		c. 1840–50	A terrace of houses with a former coach house wing at the rear. They are in sandstone with projecting eaves cornices, and stone slate roofs. The houses have two storeys and basements at the front, and three storeys at the rear. The windows are sashes, the doorways have pilasters, and there is a carriage entrance with an entablature. The coach house wing has modillion eaves brackets, four storeys, and eleven windows. In the ground floor are six segmental-arched doorways with grooved voussoirs divided by rusticated piers.	II
Former Grosvenor public house 53.79411°N 1.75512°W		c. 1840–50	The former public house is on a corner site and is in sandstone. The ground floor is grooved and contains Doric pilasters, there are entablatures over the ground and middle floors, and at the top is a cornice and blocking course. The building has three storeys, three bays on Upper Millgate, two on Ivegate, and a curved bay on the corner. In the ground floor are shop fronts, and the middle floor contains tall windows interspersed with blind arched niches with Ionic pilasters between them, the windows with alternating triangular and segmental pediments. In the top floor are rectangular windows alternating with panels and with Tuscan pilasters between them.	II
Stanford House; 53.78321°N 1.78152°W	—	c. 1840–50	A sandstone house with a moulded eaves cornice and a stone slate roof. There are two storeys and a symmetrical front of three bays. The central doorway has a rectangular fanlight, a cornice on carved consoles, and a blocking course.	II
Eldon Lodge; 53.79954°N 1.76051°W		1845	A sandstone house with rusticated quoins, moulded sill courses, a modillioned eaves cornice, and a hipped stone slate roof. There are three storeys, three bays, and a two-storey two-bay extension on the left. The central doorway has an architrave, a rectangular fanlight, and a cornice on carved leaf consoles. Flanking it are paired windows with friezes and cornices on consoles, the upper floor windows have architraves, and in the extension are tripartite windows.	II
30 Little Horton Lane; 53.79025°N 1.75771°W	—	c. 1848–50	A sandstone house on a plinth, with quoin pilasters, a moulded string course, a projecting eaves cornice, and a slate roof with coped gables. There are two storeys and an attic, and a symmetrical front of three bays. Steps with flanking walls lead up to the central porch that has Doric columns and pilasters, and a full entablature with a blocking course. The window above the doorway has a panelled architrave and a cornice, and the ground floor windows have aprons. Along the sides are three bays and a round-arched window on the gable.	II
United Reform Chapel; 53.79708°N 1.75946°W		1849	Formerly St Andrew's Presbyterian Chapel, it is in sandstone, with a slate roof, and a front of three bays. On the front are corner pilasters, and Doric columns flanking the middle bay and carrying an entablature and a pediment. The central doorway has an architrave, a rectangular fanlight, and a cornice on consoles, above which is a semicircular window. The outer bays contain round-headed windows in recessed arched surrounds each containing a keystone.	II
20–28 Chapel Street; 53.79402°N 1.74540°W	—	c. 1850	A row of six sandstone houses in pairs stepped up a hill. There are two storeys, and each house has two bays. The doorways have cornices on console brackets, and the windows are sashes with thin lintels, many of which have been altered or enlarged.	II
102, 104 and 106 Thornton Road; 53.79360°N 1.76040°W		c. 1850	Originally Soho Mills, later converted for residential use, it is in sandstone, with sill bands, dentilled eaves, and a hipped slate roof. There are four storeys and eleven bays. In the front is a large semicircular-arched entrance with voussoirs and a keystone. To the left of it, the windows in the first floor have round-arched heads.	II
10–16 Lumb Lane; 53.79797°N 1.76117°W	—	c. 1850–60	A group of four shops with living accommodation above, they are in sandstone, and have stone slate roofs with coped gables and shaped kneelers. There are two storeys and each shop has two bays, the outer shops gabled. In the ground floor are shop fronts with pilasters and an entablature, and the upper floor contains sash windows.	II
1–15 Southbrook Terrace; 53.79115°N 1.75998°W		c. 1850–60	A terrace of sandstone houses and shops, with moulded modillioned eaves brackets and slate roofs. There are two storeys and basements, and each building has two bays. The doorways are approached by steps with railings, and they have pilasters, semicircular fanlights with voussoirs in the arches, vermiculated keystones, and projecting cornices.	II
St George's Hall; 53.79265°N 1.75112°W		1851–53	The concert and meeting hall was designed by Lockwood and Mawson, and a terrace was added along the side in 1985. It is in sandstone, with an entrance front of seven bays, and a pediment over the central five bays. The ground floor of these bays is rusticated and vermiculated, and contains round-arched openings with imposts and carved keystones. Above this is a modillion bracketed entablature with giant Composite engaged columns and pilasters containing round-arched windows with keystones. Along the side are eleven bays, the middle nine bays separated in the upper part by columns, and each containing a round-arched window above a smaller window with a flat head. Over the terrace is a balustrade, and behind it are swagged consoles.	II*
St Patrick's Church, presbytery and school 53.79768°N 1.76292°W		1852–53	The presbytery was added in 1866–67, and the buildings form a group on a corner site. They are in sandstone, and the church consists of a nave with a clerestory, north and south aisles, a chancel, and an octagonal bell turret on the south side. The presbytery has a hipped slate roof and two storeys, and its features include a canted oriel window, and a statue of St Patrick recessed in the corner. The school to the west contains mullioned and transomed windows with pointed lights.	II
The Yorkshire Sports, Telegraph and Argus Building; 53.79291°N 1.75090°W		1852–53	A warehouse in sandstone, with chamfered rusticated quoins, a grooved ground floor, moulded sill bands, and a dentilled eaves cornice with modillion brackets. There are five storeys at the front, four at the rear, eight bays along Hall Ings, and three in the left return. The ground floor windows have pilasters and keystones, and beneath each is a balustrade. In front of the first floor windows are balustraded balconies, and above them are cornices on console brackets. The windows in the second floor have round-arched heads, keystones and triangular pediments, and those in the third floor have flat heads and cornices on consoles.	II
47 Well Street and 2 Currer Street; 53.79433°N 1.74792°W	—	1855	A warehouse on a corner site designed by Lockwood and Mawson, it is in sandstone, with chamfered rusticated quoins, sill bands, a modillion cornice over the ground floor and a similar eaves cornice. There are six storeys, five bays on West Street, ten on Currer Street, and a bowed bay on the corner, and the ground floor is rusticated. The ground floor windows have vermiculated quoins, those in the first floor have segmental-arched heads and large keystones. The windows in the bowed bay are tripartite, and the doorway has fluted Doric columns, an architrave with a segmental arch, a keystone, and an entablature with a bracketed cornice.	II
1–35 Grove Terrace and 37 Great Horton Road; 53.79097°N 1.76021°W	—	c. 1855–60	A terrace of sandstone houses, with an eaves cornice on bracketed consoles and a slate roof. There are two storeys and each house has two bays. The doorways have pilasters, semicircular fanlights with voussoirs in the arches, and cornices. Nos. 7 and 29 have canted bay windows.	II
20–38 Grove Terrace; 53.79061°N 1.76031°W	—	c. 1855–60	A terrace of sandstone houses, with an eaves cornice on bracketed consoles and a slate roof. There are two storeys and basements, and each house has two bays. The doorways have pilasters, semicircular fanlights with voussoirs in the arches, and cornices.	II
25 Hallfield Road; 53.79890°N 1.76007°W		c. 1855–60	A sandstone house, later used for other purposes, it has quoin pilasters, bands, a frieze, and an eaves cornice on console brackets. There are two storeys and three bays, the middle bay projecting under a pediment and flanked by pilasters. The central doorway has a semicircular-arched head, imposts and a keystone, and is flanked by side lights with similar arches. The windows are sashes, the window above the doorway being tripartite.	II
31 Houghton Place; 53.79868°N 1.75979°W	—	c. 1855–60	A sandstone house with Italianate features, it has three storeys and a three-bay front with a gable and shaped kneelers. The central doorway has Corinthian pilasters, and a frieze with scrolled acanthus leaf ornament. This is flanked by canted bay windows, and the central window in the top floor has a round-arched head.	II
68 and 70 Vicar Lane; 53.79468°N 1.74704°W		1857–58	A warehouse on a corner site in sandstone, with a vermiculated course in the basement and horizontal grooving in the ground floor on Vicar Street, a dentilled cornice over the ground floor, sill bands, and a bracketed eaves cornice. There are four storeys and a basement, six bays on Vicar Lane, seven bays on the curved front on Currer Street, and a bowed bay on the corner, which is flanked by grooved pilaster strips. In the ground floor of the corner bay are three arches, the middle one over a doorway with a keystone, flanked by niches over panels. The windows above are tripartite with cornices. The ground floor windows have round-arched heads, and in Vicar Lane is a round-arched wagon entrance.	II
Former Midland Bank, Darley Street; 53.79499°N 1.75336°W		1858	Originally the Bradford Bank, it is in stone and in Italianate style on a corner site. The ground floor is rusticated, above it is a bracketed cornice and a parapet with balustrading, and at the top is a frieze, a cornice, and a balustraded parapet. There are three storeys, three bays on Darley Street, five on Kirkgate, and a bowed bay on the corner containing the entrance. The openings in the ground floor have round-arched heads, they are flanked by colonnettes, and have alternately vermiculated voussoirs. Between the bays in the upper floors are giant engaged Corinthian columns. The windows in the middle floor have central round-arched lights and small side lights, with pilasters between, and broken-arched segmental pediments above, and the windows in the top floor are similar but simpler.	II*
County Court; 53.79705°N 1.75541°W		1859	The court building is set back from the street, and is in sandstone with a rusticated ground floor, and is in Italianate style. The building is on a plinth, it has a moulded sill band over the ground floor, and at the top is a moulded string course, a frieze containing narrow rectangular attic windows, and a projecting eaves cornice on consoles. There are two storeys, a basement and an attic, and six bays. The doorways, which are approached by steps, are in the outer bays, and have semicircular fanlights, and all the windows have round-arched heads. In the ground floor the openings have vermiculated quoin surrounds, and carved keystones, and the windows in the upper floor have architraves and keystones. Above the left doorway are the Royal Arms.	II
53 and 55 Leeds Road; 53.79360°N 1.74692°W		c. 1859–62	A warehouse and office block in Italianate style on a corner site, built in two phases with No. 53 first. It is in sandstone with a vermiculated rusticated basement, sill bands, bracketed cornices over the ground and third floors, a frieze, and a moulded eaves cornice. The ground floor windows have round-arched heads, an impost string course, and cartouches in the spandrels, and in the first floor the windows have pilaster strips and cornices on console brackets. No. 53 has four storeys, and No. 55 has three storeys and attics with pedimented dormers. The doorway of No. 53 has engaged Doric columns and an entablature, and the doorway to No. 55 has pilasters. Between the phases is a five-storey tower with an oriel bow window in the first floor, paired windows in the upper floors, and in the top storey are circular openings for clock faces.	II
15–29 Ashgrove; 53.78976°N 1.76344°W	—	c. 1860	A symmetrical terrace of eight sandstone houses in Italianate style, with a sill band, and a bracketed eaves cornice. There are two storeys and attics, the outer houses projecting slightly under pediments. The doorways have alternating segmental and semicircular fanlights, and are flanked by rectangular bay windows with entablatures carried over the doorways on cast iron moulded columns with ornate ironwork in the spandrels and cresting over the entablatures. The windows in the upper floor have architraves and round-arched heads.	II
40 Chapel Street; 53.79446°N 1.74498°W	—	1860	A warehouse and office block on a corner site in sandstone, the basement rusticated, with sill bands, and a modillion eaves cornice. There are three storeys and a basement, five bays on Chapel Street, seven on Peckover Street, and a curved bay on the corner. The basement windows have cambered arches and keystones, and the ground floor windows have cambered arches and architraves. The doorway has a semicircular arched head with spaced voussoirs, and a fanlight in front of which is a crest.	II
2–6 Claremont; 53.79043°N 1.76363°W		c. 1860	A pair of sandstone houses with quoin pilasters, a sill band, a moulded eaves cornice on modillion brackets, and a hipped Welsh slate roof. There are two storeys and each house has three bays. The central bays contain a doorway with engaged Tuscan columns and an entablature with rosette decoration. The outer bays contain canted bay windows, and in the inner bays are tripartite windows with cornices on consoles.	II
8 and 10 Claremont; 53.79021°N 1.76334°W		c. 1860	A pair of sandstone houses with quoin pilasters, a sill band, a moulded eaves cornice on modillion brackets, and a hipped Welsh slate roof. There are two storeys and five bays. In the outer bays are canted bay windows, the middle bay contains a bow window, and between are doorways with engaged columns, architraves and entablatures.	II
9 and 11 Claremont; 53.79036°N 1.76239°W		c. 1860	A pair of stone houses with quoins, a sill band, bracketed eaves, and a hipped slate roof. There are two storeys and a basement, and five bays. In the outer bays are canted bay windows with pilasters, and in the middle bay is a tripartite rectangular bay window. The doorways between are approached by steps and have engaged columns.	II
12 and 14 Claremont; 53.79002°N 1.76306°W		c. 1860	A pair of stone houses with quoins, a sill band, bracketed eaves, and a hipped slate roof. There are two storeys and a basement, and five bays. In the outer bays are canted bay windows with pilasters, and in the middle bay is a tripartite window with a triangular pediment. The doorways between are approached by steps and have engaged Doric columns.	II
13 and 15 Claremont; 53.79012°N 1.76211°W		c. 1860	A pair of stone houses with quoins, a sill band, bracketed eaves, and a hipped slate roof. There are two storeys and five bays. In the outer bays are canted bay windows with pilasters and a Doric entablature, and in the middle bay is a tripartite window over which is a crest with a circular panel and carved consoles supporting the sill of the window above. The doorways between are approached by steps and have engaged Doric columns on pedestals, and a Doric entablature.	II
17 and 19 Claremont; 53.78996°N 1.76183°W	—	c. 1860	A pair of stone houses with quoin pilasters, a sill band, modillion bracketed eaves, and a hipped slate roof. There are two storeys and five bays. In the outer bays are canted bay windows with pedimented blocking courses, and in the middle bay is a tripartite window with a triple pedimented blocking course. The upper floor windows have round-arched heads with imposts and keystones. The doorways have pilaster strips, console brackets, and blocking courses.	II
4 Currer Street; 53.79452°N 1.74734°W		1860	A warehouse and office block on a corner site that was extended in 1867. It is in sandstone, with rusticated quoin pilasters, vermiculated courses on the ground floor, bands, a moulded frieze, and a moulded eaves cornice on modillion brackets. There are four storeys and the main front has ten bays. The ground floor windows have segmental-arched heads, and those in the first floor have round-arched heads and aprons. The curved bay on the corner with Field Street contains a doorway with a vermiculated surround, an impost band, a semicircular fanlight, alternately vermiculated voussoirs, and carved spandrels. Above it are tripartite windows, that in the first floor with a segmental pediment on consoles. In Field Street is a wagon entrance with ornate iron gates.	II
72 Vicar Lane and 9 Currer Street; 53.79485°N 1.74719°W		1860	A warehouse on a corner site in sandstone, with a string course, bands, and projecting bracketed eaves. There are three storeys and a basement, six bays on Vicar Lane, a long range along Currer Street, and a bowed bay on the corner. The corner bay is flanked by vermiculated strips in the ground floor and pilaster strips above. The bay contains a round-arched doorway with a lower rectangular fanlight and a higher semicircular fanlight, flanked by alternate vermiculated courses, and with alternately vermiculated voussoirs and a sheep's head keystone above. Over this is an oval window flanked by oval plaques containing carved initials, and above is a tripartite window with a round-arched central light. The windows in the middle floor have segmental arched heads linked by impost bands.	II
Peel Square; 53.79904°N 1.76160°W		1860	A terrace of houses forming a half-H shaped plan. They are in sandstone on a plinth, with a band, a frieze, a cornice, and a Welsh slate roof. There are two storeys, and each house has two bays. The central two houses are paired under a pediment containing a crown, the name, and the date in a wreath. Each doorway has a semicircular fanlight with a keystone, and is surrounded by pilasters, a broken entablature, and a cornice on consoles. The windows are sashes.	II
1–13 Ashgrove; 53.79014°N 1.76398°W		c. 1860–70	A terrace of seven sandstone houses, with two storeys and attics, and Dutch gables, larger over the outside and middle houses, and smaller between. Each house has a canted bay window, those in the outer and middle houses with two storeys. The doorways, some of which are paired, have block surrounds and cornices on consoles, and the windows in the upper floor are casements.	II
31–45 Ashgrove; 53.78935°N 1.76287°W	—	c. 1860–70	A symmetrical terrace of eight sandstone houses with two storeys and attics, and Gothic details. The end and middle houses project slightly and have crow-stepped gables with finials. These houses have windows with pointed arches, triple in the upper floor and single or double in the attics. The other houses have single or two-light windows with mullions in the upper floor. The doorways in the outer houses have shaped gables, and the other doorways are paired with timber porches. The ground floor windows in the outer houses are canted bay windows, and the other windows have two cusped lights with dividing shafts in overall round-headed arches.	II
17 Peckover Street; 53.79521°N 1.74592°W	—	c. 1860–70	A warehouse and office block on a corner site in sandstone, on a plinth, with rusticated quoins, a sill band, a moulded frieze, and a modillioned eaves cornice. There are two storeys, six bays on Peckover Street, and eight on Burnett Street. In Peckover Street, the left bay contains a doorway with a moulded architrave and a semicircular fanlight, the windows have round-arched heads, and they all have keystones with foliage carving. To the right is a wagon entry with profiled corbels, and in Burnett Street are two loading doors.	II
8 Currer Street; 53.79495°N 1.74668°W		1861	A warehouse and office block on a corner site, in sandstone on a plinth with vermiculated courses, a bracketed cornice over the ground floor, sill bands, and an eaves cornice on Doric brackets. There are four storeys, five bays on Currer Street, six bays on Cater Street, and a canted corner bay. The ground floor windows have segmental-arched heads and an impost string. The doorway in the corner bay has pilasters, a semicircular fanlight with initials above, carved spandrels, and a dentilled cornice.	II
Glyde House; 53.79086°N 1.75717°W		1861	A school designed by Lockwood and Mawson and later used for other purposes, it is in sandstone with a slate roof, and has two storeys on a basement. The building consists of a central three-bay range flanked by projecting wings with shaped gables. In front of the central range is a loggia with columns over which is a pieced parapet. The wings have pilasters in the ground floor, rusticated quoins above, and obelisk finials flanking the gables. In the ground floor of the wings are round-arched windows with voussoirs, and the windows in the upper floor have segmental open pediments and pierced balconettes.	II
10 Currer Street; 53.79506°N 1.74656°W	—	1862	A warehouse in Italianate style, in sandstone, the basement with vermiculated rustication, it has sill bands, and an eaves cornice with modillion brackets. There are three storeys and a basement, and seven bays. The ground floor windows have windows with segmental-arched heads, and impost bands. The wagon entrance in the left two bays has a lintel on large corbels. In the right bay is a doorway with a segmental-arched head and a decorative keystone, above which is a circular panel containing the relief carving of a pelican.	II
Cater Buildings; 53.79477°N 1.74607°W		1862	A warehouse and office block on a corner site in sandstone, the basement with vermiculated rustication, on a plinth, with sill bands, and a projecting eaves cornice on console brackets. There are four storeys and a basement, ten bays on both fronts, and the windows are sashes with thin lintels. The doorway on Cater Street has pilasters, a semicircular fanlight, and a segmental cornice on fluted consoles, above which is a cartouche with initials and the date, surrounded by acanthus scrolls.	II
18 Lumb Lane and 2–12 Hallfield Road; 53.79839°N 1.76067°W	—	1862–66	A terrace of sandstone houses with a sill band, moulded eaves on console brackets, and slate roofs. There are two storeys and each house has two or three bays. Nos. 2 and 4 and Nos. 8 and 10 have pilasters, paired doorways flanking passage entries, paired windows above with egg and dart capping, and attics with three round-headed windows flanked by pierced balustrading. All the doorways have pilasters with modified Corinthian capitals, fanlights, entablatures, and friezes with acanthus decoration. The windows are sashes, and the passage entries have arched heads and keystones. No. 18 Lumb Lane has three bays, and a central doorway with an architrave, a keystone and a moulded cornice.	II
20 Lumb Lane and 1–19 Hallfield Road; 53.79857°N 1.76084°W		1862–66	A terrace of sandstone houses with sill bands, and eaves cornices on consoles. The houses are in two and three storeys, and each house has two or three bays. The doorways are paired and have engaged columns with floral capitals, arched heads, decorative keystones, and moulded cornices. Between are passage entries that have arched heads with vermiculated voussoirs. The windows are sashes, those above the doorways are paired and arched. No. 20 Lumb Lane has three bays, and a central porch with Corinthian columns, flanked by canted bay windows. In the upper floor are windows with vermiculated voussoired arches.	II
14–26 Hallfield Road; 53.79856°N 1.76017°W	—	1862–66	A terrace of sandstone houses in pairs stepped down a hill, with a sill band, a moulded frieze, and an eaves cornice on paired concave brackets. There are two storeys and each house has two or three bays. The doorways have pilasters with modified Corinthian capitals, and entablatures. The windows are sashes, and the passage entries have arched heads, imposts, and keystones.	II
1 Burnett Street; 53.79486°N 1.74640°W	—	c. 1863–67	A warehouse and office block on a corner site in sandstone, with a rusticated basement, sill bands, and a bracketed eaves cornice. There are four storeys and a semi-basement, eight bays on Burnett Street, seven on Cater Street, and a canted bay on the corner. The windows in the ground floor have segmental arches and a linking impost band, and the other windows have plain surrounds. The doorway in the corner bay has pilasters, fluted imposts, a semicircular fanlight, carved panelled spandrels, an entablature with rosettes, and a cornice.	II
3 and 5 Burnett Street; 53.79507°N 1.74611°W		c. 1863–67	A warehouse and office block on a corner site in sandstone, the ground floor with vermiculated rustication, it has sill bands, and a bracketed eaves cornice. There are two and three storeys, eight bays on Burnett Street, six on Peckover Street, and a curved bay on the corner. The entrance on Burnett Street has an entablature on decorated consoles, above it is a Venetian window, and over this is a segmental pediment. On Peckover Street is a warehouse entrance with rusticated pilasters.	II
13 Currer Street; 53.79515°N 1.74688°W	—	1864	A warehouse and office block in sandstone on a plinth, with sill bands, and a projecting eaves cornice on consoles. There are four storeys and six bays. The windows in the ground floor have architraves, and those in the first floor have semicircular-arched heads, impost bands, and keystones. In the left bay is a wagon entrance with a lintel on decorative corbels. The right bay contains a doorway with Corinthian columns and pilasters on pedestals, and an entablature with a segmental pediment.	II
Pennine House; 53.79474°N 1.74836°W		1864	Two large warehouse blocks in sandstone, with bracketed cornices over the ground and first floors, sill bands, a moulded frieze, and a deep eaves cornice on consoles rising to modillion brackets. There are five storeys and a semi-basement. The ground floor windows have pilasters and round-arched heads, the windows in the first floor have cambered heads and continuous curving pediments, in the second floor they have panelled lunette heads, and the top two floors contain windows with segmental heads. The canted corner bay is flanked by incised pilasters, and contains a doorway with Roman Ionic granite columns, above it is a two-light bay window with a segmental pediment, and at the top is a pedimented gable containing a vertical oval window.	II
Hart Street, Falcon Street, Union Road, Vine Street, Lime Street, and 516–532 Great Horton Road; 53.78396°N 1.78051°W		1864–65	An area of planned houses and shops for mill workers, consisting of streets of terraces on the northwest of Great Horton Road. They are in short stepped rows of sandstone houses with stone slate roofs. The houses have two storeys and each house has two bays. The windows are sashes, the doorways have cornices on plain consoles, and some have arched passageways with imposts and keystones. On Great Horton Road are shops with hipped roofs and shops fronts with pilasters.	II
Wool Exchange; 53.79426°N 1.75242°W		1864–67	The building is on a triangular island site, and was designed by Lockwood and Mawson in Venetian Gothic style. It is in sandstone and has a hipped slate roof. There are three storeys and a clock tower at the north end. In the ground floor is an arcade of pointed arches, with portrait medallions in the spandrels. The middle floor contains two-light windows, the windows in the top floor have three lights, and on the top is an openwork parapet. On the corners are pinnacled turrets, and at the south end is a rose window. The clock tower has an open porch on the ground floor with statues under canopies in the corners. Above there are three stages, the top stage with clock faces under crocketed gables, and pinnacled corner turrets, and it is surmounted by a spire with a crocketed pinnacle.	I
4 and 6 Burnett Street and 18 Peckover Street; 53.79487°N 1.74586°W		c. 1865	A warehouse and office block on a corner site in sandstone, with a rusticated basement, sill bands, and a hipped slate roof. There are two storeys and a basement, five bays on Burnett Street, eleven on Peckover Street, and a curved bay on the corner. The windows are sashes with thin lintels. The entrance on Burnett Street has pilasters and an entablature, and above it is a Venetian window. On Peckover Street is a warehouse entrance with a cornice, and the basement area is enclosed by railings with arrowheads.	II
7 Burnett Street; 53.79538°N 1.74564°W		c. 1865	A warehouse in sandstone, the basement with vermiculated rustication, it has sill bands, a moulded frieze, and a projecting eaves cornice. There are three storeys and a basement, and seven bays. The entrance in the left bay has Corinthian columns, an entablature, a semicircular fanlight, and a segmental pediment on large carved consoles. In the right two bays is a semicircular-arched warehouse entrance with alternately projecting voussoirs.	II
9 Burnett Street; 53.79549°N 1.74545°W	—	c. 1865	A warehouse in sandstone, the basement with vermiculated rustication, it has sill bands, a shallow eaves cornice, and a stone slate roof. There are two storeys and six bays. The doorway in the left bay has paired pilasters and a triangular pediment, and to the right is a semicircular-arched warehouse entrance with a grooved surround and a keystone.	II
11 and 13 Burnett Street; 53.79566°N 1.74523°W	—	c. 1865	A warehouse and office block on a corner site in sandstone, with sill bands, a shallow eaves cornice, and a stone slate roof. There are two storeys and a basement, and a long range containing windows with shallow lintels. The building has a doorway with pilasters, and a warehouse portal.	II
Austral House; 53.79418°N 1.74779°W		c. 1865	A block of offices with warehousing to the rear, it is in millstone grit with dressings in sandstone, a plinth with capping, sill courses, and narrow carved machicolations to the eaves. There are five storeys and a basement, and ten bays, the outer pairs of bays projecting slightly under gables, while the other bays have gablets. The ground floor openings have round-arched heads, the doorway with rich carving in the tympanum, there are polished pink granite columns between the windows, and carving in the arches. The windows in the upper floors have segmental-arched heads, with grey granite columns between them in the first and top floors.	II
Two blocks and chimney, Try Mills; 53.79696°N 1.77001°W		1865	The mill is in sandstone, with sill bands, dentilled eaves, and hipped slate roofs. The block alongside the road has three storeys, a basement and an attic, and 15 bays. The windows in the top floor have round-arched heads and aprons, and in the attic are small square windows. In the centre is a segmental-arched wagon entry with voussoirs. At the rear is a range with three storeys and a basement, and an octagonal chimney with a cornice cap.	II
14 Chapel Street; 53.79374°N 1.74573°W	—	Mid 1860s	A warehouse and office in sandstone, with a rusticated ground floor, quoins, sill bands, a moulded frieze, projecting consoles, a bracketed eaves cornice, and a hipped slate roof. There are four storeys and a basement, and three narrow bays. In the ground floor is a round-arched doorway and windows. The windows in the first and top floors are round-arched with architraves and keystones, those in the first floor also with panelled aprons.	II
55 Well Street; 53.79403°N 1.74763°W	—	c. 1865–69	An office and warehouse in sandstone, with moulded sill courses, a moulded cornice over the third floor, five storeys and five bays. In the ground floor are grooved pilasters and an entablature, windows with segmental heads, and on the right is a doorway with a semicircular fanlight and a keystone on consoles. The middle window in the first floor has a triangular pediment on fluted console brackets.	II
8 Burnett Street; 53.79524°N 1.74546°W		c. 1865–70	A warehouse and office block on a corner site in Italianate style, it is in sandstone, the basement grooved, and it has sill bands, a moulded frieze, and an eaves cornice on console brackets. There are two storeys and a basement, seven bays on Burnett Street, and 13 on Scoresby Street. The windows in the basement and the ground floor have segmental heads and keystones. The entrance on Burnett Street has a panelled surround, an arched head with spaced voussoirs, and a keystone carved with a Staff of Mercury. On the Scoresby Street front are two semicircular-arched warehouse entrances, and one bay has a first floor balcony.	II
York House; 53.79698°N 1.75515°W		1866	Designed as the Bradford Club on a corner site by Lockwood and Mawson, and later used for other purposes, it is in sandstone on a plinth, with moulded sill courses, eaves on foliage modillions, and a slate roof, hipped to the right. There are three storeys and a basement, four bays on Upper Piccadilly, and three on Manor Row. The doorway has a pointed head, and a pierced balcony on consoles, and most of the windows have two lights and colonnettes. In the right return is a canted bay window, also with a pierced balcony.	II
66 Vicar Lane; 53.79458°N 1.74680°W		1866–67	A warehouse on a corner site in sandstone, with sill courses, a bracketed cornice over the ground floor, a machicolated frieze, and a bracketed eaves cornice. There are four storeys and a basement, bays along Vicar Lane and Burnett Street, and a canted bay on the corner. The ground floor windows have cambered arches with rosettes over the lintels, and the windows in the first floor have segmental-arched heads. In the corner bay is a doorway with Corinthian columns, a round arch with a panelled soffit, carved spandrels, and a cornice on console brackets. In Vicar Lane is a large segmental-arched wagon entrance with a chamfered surround containing massive iron gates including a large openwork cartwheel motif.	II
Oastler Statue; 53.79685°N 1.75691°W		1867	The statue of Richard Oastler by John Birnie Philip is in Northgate. It consists of a painted statue of a standing man and two children on a plinth of polished granite.	II
Victoria Hotel; 53.79216°N 1.75030°W		1867	The hotel, designed by Lockwood and Mawson, is in sandstone. There are four storeys, a central range of nine bays, and flanking projecting pavilions with three bays. The central doorway is flanked by paired polished granite columns, and has a round-arched fanlight with a moulded surround, and a pierced balustrade above. The windows are round-arched, with two lights in the upper two floors. In the ground floor of the pavilions are canted bay windows, and in the attics are dormers.	II
Two standard lamps, Wool Exchange; 53.79444°N 1.75208°W		c. 1867	The standard lamps stand outside the north entrance to the tower, they are decorative, and in cast iron. The stone bases are square with chamfered corners, the lamps are decorated with panels and roundels, and the lanterns have finials.	II
64 Vicar Lane and 2 and 4 Hick Street; 53.79425°N 1.74659°W		1867–68	A warehouse and office block on a corner site in sandstone, with sill bands, and an eaves cornice on carved console brackets. There are five storeys and a basement, twelve bays on Vicar Lane, and a long range along Hick Street. In the ground floor are corniced piers, over which is a frieze with Doric consoles and a cornice. At the right end is a wagon entrance with a flat lintel, and to its left is a doorway flanked by columns with blocks on panelled pedestals, and with a semicircular fanlight with a keystone. There are similar entrances on Hick Street.	II
Former Institute for the Blind; 53.79668°N 1.75570°W		1867–68	The building is on a corner site, it is in sandstone and has slate roofs. There are three storeys and a basement, six bays on Upper Piccadilly, four on North Parade, and a canted bay on the corner. The corner bay and one bay in each front is gabled with moulded saddlestones. In the ground floor are modern shop fronts, and the windows above are mullioned and transomed. In the corner bay is an oriel bay window, above it is a quatrefoil, and over that a small lancet window in the gable.	II
National Westminster Bank, Hustlergate; 53.79441°N 1.75294°W		1867–68	Originally the Bradford Commercial Bank, it is on a corner site, and in millstone grit with dressings in sandstone and polished granite. There are two storeys and an attic, five bays on Hustlergate, six on Bank Street, and on the corner is a three-storey square tower. The doorway and windows have round-arched heads and colonnettes in pink or grey granite. Above the first floor is a corbelled pierced parapet, and in the attic are gabled dormers. In the ground floor of the tower is the main entrance, with carving in the tympanum. The middle floor on both fronts has a balcony, and above the windows are crocketed gables. At the top is a pierced parapet with pinnacles, and a steep truncated slate roof with lucarne dormers and iron cresting.	II*
30 Chapel Street; 53.79416°N 1.74530°W	—	c. 1870	A warehouse and office block in sandstone, the ground floor rusticated and with a frieze and a cornice over it, a sill band, and a bracketed eaves cornice. There are four storeys and a basement, and four bays. The doorway and the windows in the ground floor have segmental arches and keystones with carved masks. In the first floor are incised panels and windows with segmental-arched heads and impost bands, and the windows in the top two floors are plain.	II
26 Kirkgate; 53.79515°N 1.75241°W	—	c. 1870	A sandstone shop on a corner site in Italianate style, with rusticated and panelled quoin pilasters, string courses and sill bands, a frieze, and a projecting eaves cornice on console brackets. There are four storeys, a modern shop front in the ground floor, and tripartite windows in the upper floors, those in the first and second floors with foliate capped columns. In front of the second floor window is a baluster balconette on scrolled brackets, and above it is a segmental pediment containing a rinceaux surround.	II
36 and 38 Chapel Street; 53.79435°N 1.74513°W	—	c. 1870–71	A warehouse and office block in sandstone, the ground floor and basement rusticated, with sill bands, a projecting eaves cornice on console brackets, and a hipped slate roof. It is in Italianate style, and has four storeys and a basement, and nine bays. The windows in the ground and first floors have segmental-arched heads, those in the ground floor with keystones and aprons, and those in the first floor with an impost band and incised panels between. In the left bay is a round-arched doorway with a carved lintel, spaced voussoirs and a carved keystone, and a semicircular fanlight in front of which is a crest. Near the centre is a segmental-arched wagon entrance.	II
46 Peckover Street and 29 and 31 East Parade; 53.79429°N 1.74462°W		c. 1870–71	A sandstone warehouse on a corner site in Scottish baronial style, with moulded string courses, sill courses, stepped corbelled eaves, and a slate roof with crow-stepped gables. There are three storeys, basements and attics, and a front of seven bays. The middle bay projects, and contains a tall doorway with a canted oriel window above. At the top are bartizan turrets, and in the attic are gabled dormers. The windows have moulded surrounds, and the basement area is enclosed by cast iron railings.	II
Town Hall; 53.79220°N 1.75319°W		1870–73	The town hall was designed by Lockwood and Mawson, and extended in 1905–09 by Frederick E. P. Edwards, under the guidance of the elderly Richard Norman Shaw|Norman Shaw. It is in sandstone, and has a triangular plan, with three storeys and attics, and a polygonal corner. The main front is symmetrical with a central entrance flanked by octagonal turrets, above which is an oriel window, and behind is a tall thin bell tower 217 feet (66 m) high. In the ground floor are plain two-light windows, the middle floor contains two-light arched windows, and the top floor is treated as an arcade with statues of kings and queens of England plus Oliver Cromwell in canopied niches. Above is a balustrade and in the attic are gabled dormers with finials.	I
29 Canal Street and 20 and 22 Mill Street; 53.79793°N 1.74958°W		c. 1870–74	A warehouse and office block on a corner site in sandstone, with rusticated quoin pilasters on the ground floor, sill bands, a cornice above the ground floor, and a bracketed eaves cornice. There are four storeys, seven bays on Canal Road, 35 bays on Mill Street, and a canted bay on the corner. In the Canal Road front are two round-arched doorways, one converted into a window, and in the two floors above them the windows have cornices, in the first floor on consoles.	II
14 Mill Street, gate piers and railings 53.79740°N 1.74994°W	—	c. 1870–74	A warehouse and office block in stone, in Italianate style, on a plinth, with a first floor cornice, sill bands, and a projecting eaves cornice on console brackets. There are four storeys, a front of three bays, and sides of eleven bays. The ground floor has rusticated piers, and in the right bay is a round-headed doorway with a keystone. The windows have architraves. To the left are gate piers with heavy caps, and spear head railings.	II
6–20 St Andrew's Villas and 94–110 Preston Street; 53.79376°N 1.77069°W		c. 1870–80	A group of originally back to back houses, consisting of linked sandstone blocks that have an H-shaped plan with a central two-storey range and three-storey cross-wings. The cross-wings have crow-stepped gables, some with pinnacles, and there are gabled porches in the angles. The buildings exhibit various High Victorian Gothic features.	II
26 and 28 Sunbridge Road; 53.79373°N 1.75464°W	—	c. 1870–80	A sandstone shop with a moulded eaves cornice and a slate roof. There are four storeys and five bays. In the ground floor is a modern shop front, and the windows in the first floor have architraves, the middle window also with a pediment.	II
34–44 Sunbridge Road; 53.79379°N 1.75506°W	—	c. 1870–80	A row of shops in sandstone, with four storeys and modern shop fronts in the ground floor. Nos. 34 and 36 have pilasters, and an eaves cornice on console brackets, and the upper floors contain round-arched windows with aprons. The other shops were added later, and have a cornice over the ground floor, sill bands, a frieze, and a moulded eaves cornice. The windows in the ground floor have architraves and cornices.	II
Halifax Building Society; 53.79460°N 1.75297°W		c. 1870–80	The building is in stone, with sill courses, a moulded frieze, and a moulded eaves cornice with flanking paired carved console brackets. There are four storeys and three bays. Pilasters with foliate caps and an entablature frame the lower two floors. In the centre of the ground floor is an arched doorway with carving in the spandrels, and the flanking windows have hood moulds. In the first floor are paired arched windows with pilasters and impost bands. The second floor contains round-arched windows with colonnettes dividing the two lights, and in the top floor are paired round-arched windows with dividing pilasters.	II
9–15 Bridge Street, 30–36 Market Street, 25–29 Tyrrel Street and 1–9 Ivegate; 53.79347°N 1.75333°W		1871	An island block of shops and offices in sandstone with four storeys and Italianate and Venetian Gothic features. The eaves cornices have modillion brackets or false machicolation. In the ground floor are modern shop fronts, the upper storeys contain windows of various types, and the corners are canted.	II
8 Piccadilly; 53.79535°N 1.75296°W		1871	Built as the History and Scientific Institute and later used as an office, it is in sandstone on a plinth, the ground floor is grooved, and it has bands, and a deep modillion eaves cornice. The building is in Italianate style, and has three storeys and three bays. The central doorway has grooved pilasters, columns, a fanlight, and large console brackets carrying a balconette with a pierced-circle balustrade. The window above it has two lights, pilasters, a frieze and a pediment, and the flanking windows have an architrave, and the lights are divided by pilasters with foliate capitals. In the centre of the top floor is a plaque with an inscription and an eagle carved in relief.	II
Caspian House; 53.79457°N 1.74435°W		1871	A warehouse and office block on a corner site in sandstone on a reeded plinth, with moulded sill bands, and a moulded eaves cornice on modillion brackets. There are five storeys and a basement, six bays on East Parade, five on Peckover Street, and a canted bay on the corner. The corner bay is flanked by pilasters with foliate capitals and rusticated shafts. In the ground floor is a doorway with a round arch carved with rinceaux and the tympanum with vine leaves, shell, and scrollwork. Above it is a balcony on carved consoles, and a window with an architrave and a segmental pediment with an iron finial on consoles.	II
Devere House; 53.79396°N 1.74688°W		1871	A warehouse and office block on a corner site designed by Lockwood and Mawson, it is in sandstone, with a cornice on carved consoles over the ground floor, sill courses above, and at the top a projecting eaves cornice. There are five storeys, seven bays on Vicar Lane, three on Aked Street, and a canted bay on the corner. The entrance in the corner bay is flanked by carved panels and has a large segmental pediment on consoles containing carved scrollwork. The doorway is flanked by Corinthian columns, and has vermiculated voussoirs with festoons, and a carved eagle in the tympanum. The windows in the ground floor have segmental heads, and between them are piers with moulded bases, Greek key bands, and vermiculated courses. In the first floor the windows have round-arched heads, panelled pilasters with foliate heads, carved spandrels, modillioned pediments, and balconettes. In the second and third floors the windows have round-arched heads and impost bands, and the top floor windows have segmental heads.	II*
Main block and wing, Harold Laycock Mills; 53.79193°N 1.77427°W		1871	Built as Legrams Mill, a spinning mill, and designed by Lockwood and Mawson, it is in sandstone with bands on each floor, a bracketed eaves cornice, and a stone slate roof. There are four storeys and basements, and a front of 26 bays. The ground floor windows have round-arched heads, forming an arcade, there are stair towers with pyramidal roofs, and the chimney has been truncated.	II
Ambler Mill and Midland Mills Warehouses; 53.80072°N 1.75230°W		1871–73	A complex of mills and warehouses on each side of Cape Street. They are in sandstone and have four storeys. The range to the north has sill bands, an eaves cornice on modillion brackets, and parapets. The range to the south has a semi-basement, and the ground floor windows have aprons. The front facing Valley Road has a pedimented gable and that towards Canal Road has a corner pavilion with iron scrolled cresting.	II
Church House; 53.79694°N 1.75607°W		1871–73	Built as the Church Institute, later used as offices, the building is in sandstone, with a moulded bracketed cornice, and a pierced parapet. There are three storeys and five bays. In the ground floor is a modern shop front flanked by portals with shafts. In the middle floor are windows with columns as mullions, and the outer windows have gargoyles. The top floor is much larger, and contains an arcade of pointed windows, corbelled shafts, roundels with carved heads, and at the top is a gabled dormer with pinnacles.	II
Thorpe Buildings; 53.79383°N 1.75356°W		1871–76	Originally a department store, later a bank, it is in stone, with a cornice on console brackets. There are four storeys and attics, a triangular plan, and a canted entrance bay. The doorway has Roman Ionic columns, a semicircular fanlight with a keystone, and above it is a three-light bow window with a balustraded parapet. Between the bays in the ground floor are pilasters with wreath caps, and the three middle windows in the first and second floors are flanked by paired Composite columns. In the attic are dormers, the dormer on the corner bay with a segmental pediment and flanking scrolls, and the others with curved cornices.	II
Behrens Warehouse; 53.79420°N 1.74423°W		1873	A large warehouse and office block on a corner site in sandstone with Italianate details. The basement is rusticated, above the ground floor windows is a deep frieze and a projecting cornice, above the first floor is a bracketed cornice, the upper floors have sill bands, and at the top is a prominent eaves cornice on console brackets. There are five storeys and a semi-basement, 14 bays on East Parade, and ten on Peckover Street. At the east end of the East Parade front is a massive portal flanked by paired banded pilasters with acanthus capitals, an entablature with a cornice, and a balustraded balcony, and to the right is a wagon entrance containing ornate cast and wrought iron gates. Between the ground floor windows are grooved pilasters, and the first floor windows have segmental heads.	II*
National Westminster Bank, Market Street; 53.79464°N 1.75144°W		1873	Originally the Bradford District Bank, it is on a corner site, in stone on a grooved plinth, with an entablature over the ground floor, and at the top a frieze, a cornice, and a parapet with an arcaded balustrade. There are three storeys, four bays on Market Street, five on Cheapside, and a bowed bay on the corner. Above the corner bay is a drum with pilasters, a frieze with swags, a cornice, and a coffered pointed lead dome. Between the ground floor windows are piers with moulded bases, moulded caps with egg and dart decoration, and leaf motifs. The doorway in the corner bay has engaged Roman Doric columns and a block pediment. Between the bays in the upper floors are giant engaged Corinthian columns. The windows are sashes in architraves, those in the middle floor with cornices.	II
Former Sion Chapel and Presbytery; 53.79387°N 1.74358°W		1873	The church was designed by Lockwood and Mawson in Classical style with the presbytery at the rear. It is in sandstone, and has two storeys and a front of five bays. On the front are Corinthian columns and pilasters, a deep entablature, and a pediment with modillion brackets and acroteria. There are three doorways, and the windows in the upper floor have moulded architraves, small pediments, and carved aprons. In the tympanum of the pediment is a circular date panel with scrolled decoration. The presbytery has two storeys, seven bays, sill bands, a bracketed eaves cornice, and a slate roof.	II
Law Russell Warehouse; 53.79430°N 1.74699°W		1873–74	The warehouse was designed by Lockwood and Mawson, it is in sandstone, and has sill bands, and an eaves cornice on console brackets. There are five storeys and a tall basement, and a wedge-shaped plan, with long side ranges and a canted bay on the corner. Along the ranges on Vicar Lane and Field Street, the ground floor windows have round-arches forming an arcade under a bracketed cornice, and the upper floor windows are plain. In the corner bay are two pairs of Corinthian columns in each floor and a modillion cornice entablature. The round-arched doorway has a concave and coffered surround with vermiculation above the voussoirs, and a keystone. In the first and second floor are round-arched windows with curved pediments on consoles, and the top two floors contain Venetian windows with caved spandrels. The attic is stepped and surmounted by a copper dome with iron cresting.	II*
Cathedral Building, Bradford College; 53.79798°N 1.74706°W		c. 1875	Originally a parish school and later converted for the college, it consists of a long two-storey range with canted terminal bays. In the centre is a gabled tower with a truncated slate spire, and a rose window in the bell stage. There is a gabled porch flanked by columns and with a large lunette.	II
43 and 45 Darley Street and 133 Godwin Street; 53.79586°N 1.75501°W	—	1875–76	A building on a corner site with Italianate features, it is in stone with vermiculated banding in the ground and first floors, a moulded eaves cornice, and a balustraded parapet. There are four storeys, and a canted bay on the corner. The windows in the second floor have round-arched heads, one with a triangular pediment on console brackets. On Darley Street is a massive pediment over a former doorway.	II
12–20 Sunbridge Road; 53.79367°N 1.75427°W		c. 1875–80	A row of offices and shops in sandstone, with a corbelled eaves cornice, and four storeys. In the ground floor are modern shop fronts. The upper floors are almost completely filled with windows that have stilted shaped heads, and between the lights are free-standing colonnettes.	II
2–18 and 47 Queensgate and 39–49 Bank Street; 53.79443°N 1.75339°W	—	1876	A block of offices and shops designed by Lockwood and Mawson with Italianate features, it is in stone with quoin pilasters, string courses, sill courses, a modillion eaves cornice, a parapet with crested plaques, and pyramidal slate roofs. There are four storeys and a wedge-shaped plan with splayed corners. Over the ground floor is a bracketed cornice, and the windows in the first and second floors, some of which are tripartite, have architraves and pediments on consoles. On Bank Street is a doorway with Roman Doric fluted columns and pilasters, and a segmental pediment on consoles.	II
Former Sunday School, Upper Park Gate; 53.79587°N 1.74504°W		1876	The Sunday school, later used for other purposes, is in sandstone on a plinth, with sill bands and a moulded eaves cornice. There are two storeys and a front of seven bays, the middle three bays projecting slightly under a pedimented gable. On the front are two doorways with fanlights and cornices on consoles, and in the centre of the upper floor is a large triple-arched window. The windows in the ground floor have round-arched heads.	II
Fountain Hall; 53.79746°N 1.75771°W		1876–77	Originally a Friends' meeting house, it was designed by Lockwood and Mawson in Classical style, but has become derelict. The front is in sandstone on a plinth, with chamfered rusticated quoins, a sill band, and a projecting cornice on modillion brackets. There are two storeys and five bays. In the centre is a tetrastyle Roman Doric portico in antis. The ground floor windows have cornices on consoles, and the middle three windows in the upper floor have architraves.	II
Deutsche Evangelische Kirche; 53.79123°N 1.75931°W		1877	A church and minister's house built for the German community. It is in sandstone with a slate roof. There is a canted projection on the left surmounted by a broach spire with a pyramidal roof and a flèche. To the right are four bays, the right bay with two storeys and a gable containing a gabled doorway with a blind rose window above the door. Further to the right, the house has two bays, the right bay with three storeys and a gable, the left bay containing a doorway with a pointed arch.	II
Grove Building, Bradford College; 53.79118°N 1.76139°W		1877	Originally a Methodist chapel, it was extended to the left in about 1904, and converted into a college library in 1988. It is in sandstone, and has a front of two storeys on a semi-basement, and five bays. Steps lead up to a portico with six Composite columns and a dentilled entablature, and the ground floor openings have round-arched heads. In the upper floor are pilasters, a panelled frieze, and a dentilled cornice. Above the middle three bays is an open pedimented gable, and the outer bays have a balustraded parapet with vases. The extension to the left includes a tower containing tall round-arched windows.	II
Register Office; 53.79716°N 1.75434°W		1877	The office block is in sandstone on a rusticated plinth, the ground floor is rusticated, and the building has quoin pilasters, moulded cornices, a sill course, an eaves cornice on modillion brackets, and a hipped slate roof. There are three storeys and a front of three bays. The central doorway has Corinthian columns and pilasters, and a moulded entablature, and is flanked by segmental-arched windows. The windows in the middle floor have architraves, panelled aprons, friezes with swags, and cornice hoods on console brackets. The middle window also has a balcony and a segmental pediment with the Royal Arms.	II
The Union Club; 53.79488°N 1.75274°W	—	1877	The building is on a corner site and was designed by Lockwood and Mawson. It in sandstone on a plinth, with a sill course, and machicolated eaves with gargoyles. There are three storeys and an attic, five bays on Kirkgate and a long range on Piece Hall Yard including a gabled entrance bay. The entrance portal is round-arched, above it is a foliate carved cornice and a balustrade, in the tympanum is an ornate lantern, and to the right is a large bay window in the upper floors. On Kirkgate are modern shop fronts, tall round-arched windows in the first floor, and in the attic are gabled dormers.	II
Talbot Hotel; 53.79479°N 1.75322°W		1877–78	The block on a corner site, which was originally a hotel, is in stone, it has a cornice over the ground floor, and at the top is a bracketed eaves cornice. There are four storeys, sides of six bays, and curved bays on the corners. In the ground floor are modern shop fronts, and two hotel doorways with banded pilasters and consoles carrying cornices with plaster casts of Talbot hounds. The windows in the first floor have round-arched heads, those in the second floor have segmental heads, in both floors there are broken entablatures on consoles, and in the second floor are decorated pediments. In the top floor the windows are divided by pilasters with roundels. On the tops of the corners are paired chimneys linked by sections of balustrade.	II
5–11 Upper Millergate; 53.79398°N 1.75517°W	—	1879	A shop in sandstone with sill bands and a projecting eaves cornice. There are four storeys and four bays. The ground floor contains a modern shop front and has an entablature with carved console brackets and anthemion crests. The windows in the first floor have architraves and cornices.	II
33 Hustlergate; 53.79451°N 1.75251°W		1880	A bank on a corner site, later a public house, it is in sandstone, with three storeys and attics, five bays on Hustlergate, three on Piece Hall Yard, and a canted bay on the corner. The bays are divided by pilasters, those in the ground floor rusticated, each floor has an entablature, and at the top is an eaves cornice on fluted consoles. The doorway in the corner bay has pilasters, and in the attic are pedimented dormers.	II
1–11 Manor Row and 4 Duke Street; 53.79659°N 1.75392°W		c. 1880	A warehouse and office block on a corner site in sandstone, the ground floor rusticated, over which is a bracketed cornice, sill bands, and a projecting moulded eaves cornice. There are five storeys, 29 bays on Manor Row, nine on Duke Street, and a canted bay on the corner. The windows have segmental heads in the ground floor and flat heads above. Also in the ground floor are two loading bays in Manor Row, and one in Duke Street, and doorways with varying surrounds.	II
24 Sunbridge Road; 53.79370°N 1.75451°W		c. 1880	A stone office that was altered in 1924, with four storeys and three bays. In the ground floor are pilasters and a modern office front. The upper floors contain windows with architraves, those in the first floor also with shallow segmental pediments.	II
44 Chapel Street; 53.79481°N 1.74461°W	—	c. 1880	A warehouse and factory block on a corner site in sandstone. There are three storeys and an attic, five bays on Chapel Street, four on Scoresby Street, and on the corner the lower two floors are canted with the upper floor corbelled out. The windows are relatively large, and in the gable end is an oculus.	II
Colonial Buildings; 53.79427°N 1.75973°W		c. 1880	A warehouse and office block in sandstone, with corner pilaster strips, a moulded cornice, and a parapet with a carved panel in the centre. There are two storeys and a semi-basement on the front, three storeys at the rear, a long range of 23 bays, and a canted corner at the south end. The doorways have fanlights flanked by pilasters on console brackets, and decorative scrolled pediments.	II
Queen Anne Chambers; 53.79361°N 1.75557°W		1880	An office block in stone, with pulvinated friezes, cornices, and a hipped slate roof. There are four storeys and an attic, and a front of three bays. In the ground floor is a central doorway, four windows, and an entablature. The upper floors contain three-light mullioned and transomed casement windows, and in the attic are pedimented dormers containing the date.	II
Old Building, Bradford College; 53.79143°N 1.76188°W		c. 1880–82	The college, which is in Italianate style, is in stone, and has a central tower and a two-storey six-bay wing on each side. The wings have a modillion cornice, and a parapet with dies, and the windows in the upper floor have round-arched heads. The right wing is more highly decorated, with the bays divided by Corinthian columns, and in the left wing by Corinthian pilasters. The central bay projects slightly and is flanked by columns. It contains an entrance with an entablature, over which is a segmental pediment, and a Venetian window. The tower has a square stage with urns, surmounted by an octagonal lantern and a domed cupola.	II
39 and 41 Chapel Street; 53.79526°N 1.74460°W	—	c. 1880–90	A block in sandstone on a sloping corner site. There are four storeys and attics, six bays on Chapel Street, four bays on Upper Park Gate, and a canted bay with a doorway on the corner. The windows in the first and second floors in the middle four bays form an arcade of segmental arches. The end bays are narrower and contain semicircular arched windows.	II
28 East Parade and 29 Peckover Street; 53.79449°N 1.74396°W	—	c. 1880–90	A warehouse and office block on a corner site in sandstone, with string and sill courses, and a moulded eaves cornice. There are three storeys and a basement, a long range along East Parade, a canted bay on the corner, and three bays on Peckover Street under a gable containing an oculus, with ball finials, and a parapet extending over the corner bay. In the corner bay is a doorway with pilasters and a steep pediment, above which is a bow window on fluted console brackets, and an oval window. At the rear is an engine house with a tapering chimney.	II
8–20 Manor Row and 2–8 Broad Street; 53.79692°N 1.75385°W		1883	A warehouse and office block on a corner site in sandstone, with sill bands, large block brackets to the cornice, and a parapet. There are five storeys, 18 bays on Manor Row, 18 bays on Broad Street, and a canted bay on the corner. In the ground floor in Manor Row are piers carrying an entablature, and doorways with pediments on large consoles. The windows in the first floor have cambered arches rising from imposts, and in the second floor they have cornices on consoles.	II
Lincolnshire House; 53.79571°N 1.75523°W	—	1883	The building is on a corner site, in stone on a plinth, with bands, an eaves cornice on carved consoles, and a parapet. There are four storeys and attics, five bays on Godwin Street, three on Rawson Place, and a canted bay on the corner. In the ground floor are shop fronts, and above the entrance on Godwin Street is a triangular pediment on carved consoles with carving in the tympanum. The windows in the first floor have similar pediments, and in the second floor is a band with pediments alternately triangular and segmental over each window. In the attic are dormers with semicircular crowns.	II
Great Horton School and master's house 53.78116°N 1.78158°W		1884–86	The school and house are in sandstone. The school has a single storey, and consists of a central hall and flanking classroom wings. The hall has two large Venetian windows with pedimented gables and ball finials, and the windows in the wings are mullioned and transomed. The master's house to the right has two storeys and a hipped slate roof. It has angle pilasters and ball finials, and on the front is a rectangular bay window.	II
Corner Block, Midland Hotel; 53.79538°N 1.75180°W		1885	This block of the hotel, designed by Charles Trubshaw for the Midland Railway, is in sandstone, with a grooved ground floor, sill bands, a moulded eaves cornice, and a mansard roof with gables. There are four storeys and an attic, a canted corner bay, and at the rear is a five-storey octagonal tower with a domed roof. The entrance is in the ground floor of the tower, and has fluted Doric columns, an entablature, a lunette with a carved surround, and a keystone with a female head. Above the entrance is a bowed balcony with a balustrade and vases. The windows in the upper floors of the block have scrolled iron balconies, continuous in the first floor, and above the first floor windows are rinceaux carved panels.	II
Former General Post Office; 53.79528°N 1.74884°W		1886–87	The post office, later St Peter's House, was designed by Sir Henry Tanner, it is in stone, and has hipped slate roofs. There are two storeys and attics, and an almost symmetrical front, with a central block of five bays, flanked by-three storey pavilions, and recessed lower wings. The central block has an entablature on banded pilasters, the ground floor windows have flat heads, and the windows in the upper floor have round-arched heads with keystones and a continuous impost. In the roof is a segmental pedimented gable with a clock face flanked by pedimented dormers, and a balustraded parapet, and in the centre of the roof is a bell turret.	II
Cresta House; 53.79646°N 1.75544°W		1887	Originally the Royal Hotel and later used for other purposes, it is on a corner site, and is in sandstone. There are four storeys and attics, fronts with two bays and shaped gables, a canted bay on the corner, and a further bay on Darley Street. In the ground floor is a modern shop front, and the windows in the upper floors are mullioned and transomed, with pulvinated friezes and shaped pediments. The gabled wings contain arches that frame the windows, and the bay in Darley Street has three windows in each upper floor.	II
Furness House, Forward House, Equity Chambers and Auburn House; 53.79655°N 1.75437°W	—	c. 1890	A warehouse and office block on an island site in sandstone, with a rusticated basement, sill bands, a dentilled eaves cornice, and a slate roof. There are five storeys, attics and basements, fronts of 26, eleven, ten and seven bays, and a bay in each of the three canted corners. The windows in the ground floor have segmental-arched heads, and the other windows have flat heads. The central bay on the Piccadilly front is flanked by pilasters rising to a pedimented dormer. The doorway has a fanlight with a segmental head, flanking small windows, and the windows above are tripartite. Each canted corner contains a doorway and at the top a pedimented dormer, and on the sides are large loading entrances.	II
Statue to W. E. Forster; 53.79521°N 1.74919°W		1890	The statue commemorates W. E. Forster, a local member of parliament and is by J. Harvard Thomas. It depicts a man in contemporary dress standing on a pedestal of polished granite.	II
The Lloyds Building; 53.79742°N 1.74906°W	—	c. 1890	A warehouse in stone with sill bands, a moulded cornice, and a roof of slate and glass with coped gables. There are five storeys and a basement, and a symmetrical front of seven bays. The central doorway has a fanlight with a segmental arch. Between the basement windows are rusticated piers, the windows in the ground floor are cross casements, between them are pilasters, and above is an entablature and a cornice. The windows in the upper floors are sashes.	II
126 Sunbridge Road and 9 Vincent Street; 53.79467°N 1.76023°W	—	1892	A warehouse and office block on a corner site in sandstone, with a frieze, and a moulded eaves cornice. There are three storeys and a semi-basement, six bays on Sunbridge Road and eight on Vincent Street. The windows in the basement and top floor on the Sunbridge Street front have segmental-arched heads. The doorway has an architrave and a small pediment on consoles.	II
Manor Buildings; 53.79669°N 1.75341°W		1892	A warehouse and office block on a corner site in sandstone, with an entablature over the ground floor, sill bands in the upper floors, a bracketed cornice, a parapet and a mansard attic. There are six storeys, an attic and a basement, bays along Manor Row and School Street, and a canted bay on the corner. The windows in the first floor have cornices with central pediments.	II
Prudential Assurance; 53.79363°N 1.75389°W		1895	An office designed by Alfred Waterhouse for Prudential Assurance on a corner site, it is in red brick, terracotta, and grey granite. There are three storeys and attics, sides of four bays, and canted corner bays. The windows in the ground floor and the doorways in the corner bays have round-arched heads. Above the doorways are two rectangular oriel windows, and at the top is a two-bay arcaded loggia with a balcony. The other windows are mullioned or mullioned and transomed, and in the attic are gabled dormers with arcades between.	II
Yorkshire Bank; 53.79765°N 1.75661°W		1895–98	Built as the Yorkshire Penny Bank on a corner site, it is in sandstone on a stepped and moulded plinth, with entablatures to each floor, an ornate frieze, and a bracketed decorated cornice. There are three storeys, sides of four bays, and a bowed three-bay corner. In the ground floor of the corner is a loggia with an arcade of three moulded arches with voussoirs and keystones. The first floor contains two-light windows with colonnettes as mullions. In the second floor is an open arcade with a balcony and a balustraded parapet. Above this is a dormer flanked by polygonal turrets, over which is an octagonal cupola containing clock faces and with an ogee lead dome. On the sides are round-arched windows in the ground floor, and at the top are dormers with broken segmental pediments.	II
14, 16 and 18 North Parade; 53.79706°N 1.75620°W		1897	A row of three shops with three storeys and attics and three bays. In the ground floor are modern shop fronts and pilasters. The upper two floors are treated as an arcade of three moulded arches, with keystones, a festooned frieze, and a cornice. In the first floor of the right bay is a canted bay window, otherwise the arches are fully glazed, with mullions and double transoms. In the attic are three dormers with Dutch gables.	II
36 and 38 North Parade and 39 Manor Row; 53.79751°N 1.75664°W	—	1897	A pair of sandstone shops, with four storeys and two bays. In the ground floor are modern shop fronts and panelled piers with an entablature, and on the right is a passage entry. The middle two floors contain two-storey mullioned bow windows with swept parapets above. In the top floor are two-light windows, and all are contained within giant pilastered arcades. At the top are steep gables surmounted by small broken pediments on baluster supports.	II
18 and 20 Canal Road; 53.79700°N 1.74916°W		1898	A sandstone warehouse with a vermicular basement and ground floor, a sill band, a cornice over the ground floor, a bracketed cornice over the fourth floor, and a shallow eaves cornice. There are six storeys and a basement, a wedge-shaped plan with sides of multiple bays, and one bay on the corner flanked by rusticated quoins. The windows have flat lintels. In the corner bay is a round-arched doorway above which are paired windows with a pediment. At the top of the bay is a lunette with a pediment.	II
Devonshire House; 53.79737°N 1.75653°W		1898	A shop and offices in stone, with three storeys, three bays, and a gabled attic over the right two bays. In the ground floor is a shop front with an inscribed and dated panel over the central doorway. The windows in the upper two floors are mullioned and transomed with small top lights. In the attic is a window, in front of which is a serpentine wrought iron balcony. The gable is flanked by finials, and over the left bay is a balustrade.	II
29 Manor Row; 53.79725°N 1.75556°W		1899	Originally an office, later part of the County Court, it is in sandstone on a plinth, with a rusticated ground floor, a cornice above it, a sill course, a dentilled eaves cornice, and a parapet. There are two storeys and an attic, and five bays. The outer bays are wider and flanked by quoin pilasters, they contain tripartite windows, and at the top are shaped ornate gables. The doorway has Doric columns on pedestals carrying a segmental pediment with the Royal Arms. In the attic are three segmental pedimented dormers.	II
Rawson Hotel; 53.79615°N 1.75634°W		1899–1905	The hotel is in stone, on a corner site, with a tower on the corner. There are three storeys and attics, three bays on John Street, one on Rawson Place, and a curved bay on the corner. The tower is circular with five storeys, at the top is a drum with four pairs of Corinthian columns, entablatures surmounted by urns, and a dome with a cupola lantern. In the centre of the John Street front is a segmental-arched portal, above which is a large lunette window flanked by shallow canted bay windows. Between the bays in the upper floors are Corinthian columns with block-banded bases. The windows in the top floor are mullioned and transomed, and in the attic are pedimented dormers with crocketed finials between.	II
Former Midland Bank, Market Street; 53.79389°N 1.75214°W		c. 1900	The bank is in stone on a corner site, and has a grooved ground floor with a cornice, above which is an entablature with a modillion cornice over the second floor, and at the top is a dentilled cornice and a mansard roof. There are four storeys and attics, four bays on Market Street, six on Bank Street, and a bowed bay on the corner. The corner bay contains a doorway, above the second floor window is a cartouche, and in the top floor is a recessed drum with scroll buttresses, over which is a lead dome with a finial. The ground floor windows have round-arched heads. The bays in the first and second floors are divided by engaged Roman Doric columns, and the windows have architraves, those in the first floor also with keystones. In the top floor the bays are divided by panelled pilasters, and in the attic are pedimented dormers.	II
The Commercial Inn; 53.79533°N 1.75623°W		c. 1900	The public house is in painted stone with a bracketed cornice and parapet. There are two storeys and a basement and three bays. The upper floor is flanked by squat Roman Ionic pilasters. Steps lead up to the doorway that has an architrave and a carved garland above it, and the windows have Gibbs surrounds and keystones.	II
Bradford Conditioning House; 53.80126°N 1.75130°W		1900–02	The conditioning house is a large building in sandstone, the basement rusticated, with a cornice over the ground floor and an eaves cornice. There are four storeys and a basement, three long ranges round an open court, and a canted corner bay. The main entrance has pilasters, a central round arch with a keystone, carving in the spandrels, and ornate iron gates, flanked by smaller arched entries with an oculus above each. Over this are three-light windows, and a pedimented attic with ball finials. There is a smaller entrance in the corner bay.	II
New Beehive Inn; 53.79736°N 1.76190°W		1901	The public house, whose interior was redecorated in 1936, is built in stone, with double string courses, and a slate roof. There are three storeys, a double pile plan, and three bays. The middle bay is narrow, it contains a doorway, and at the top is a semicircular pediment with a finial. The wide outer bays have shaped gables, and the lower two floors contain recessed bow windows. Between the upper string courses is a decorated panel with a datestone, and flanking this the name of the public house. The public house has maintained its original plan internally, together with decorative features from 1901 and 1936.	II
37 Chapel Street; 53.79498°N 1.74489°W	—	1902	A large warehouse and office block on a corner site, it has an iron and steel frame encased in sandstone, the ground floor grooved, with a sill band, a bracketed cornice below the attic, and a shallow eaves cornice. There are five storeys and attics, and sides of ten bays. The windows are recessed in shallow vertical panels. The entrance on Chapel Street, and that in the right return, each has a flat-headed portal containing a round-arched doorway with engaged fluted columns, a semicircular fanlight with a keystone and carved spandrels, and two small windows above.	II
Eastbrook Hall; 53.79355°N 1.74647°W		1902–04	A Methodist hall later divided into flats, it is in sandstone, with moulded sill courses, four storeys, and five bays. In the centre is a large segmental-arched portal over which is an oriel window. At the top is a window flanked by buttresses that rise to pinnacles, between which is a parapet with urns and a central octagonal drum with a copper dome and a lantern. In the outer bays of the ground floor are shop fronts, and above are panelled pilasters between tripartite mullioned windows. At the top are dormers with pediments, in the outer bays triangular, and in the inner bays segmental.	II
Victoria Memorial; 53.79140°N 1.75658°W		1904	The memorial consists of a statue in bronze by Alfred Drury, that depicts Queen Victoria in Imperial robes standing and holding the orb and sceptre. It stands on a plinth in a terraced garden designed by J. W. Simpson.	II
15 and 17 Canal Road; 53.79699°N 1.74970°W		1905–07	A sandstone warehouse with sill bands, a bracketed cornice over the third floor, and a shallow top cornice. There are five storeys and a basement, a wedge-shaped plan with sides of multiple bays, and one bay on the corner flanked by pilaster strips. The windows in the ground and first floor have segmental-arched heads, and the other windows have flat lintels. In the corner bay is a doorway with a triangular pediment, there is a similar doorway in Canal Road, and a wagon entrance in Mill Street.	II
24, 26 and 28 North Parade; 53.79730°N 1.75641°W	—	c. 1907–10	A row of three shops and offices in sandstone, with string courses and cornices. There are three storeys and attics, and each shop has three bays. In the ground floor are modern shop fronts and pilasters, and the windows in the upper floors are divided by pilasters. The attic contains three gabled dormers linked by a pierced parapet.	II
36 Peckover Street; 53.79474°N 1.74553°W	—	c. 1912–14	A warehouse and office block in sandstone, in Greek Revival style with Art Nouveau features. There are three storeys, a basement and attics, and five bays. In the ground floor is an entablature, and above is a sill band with a Greek key pattern, an impost string course, a moulded frieze, a bracketed cornice, and a parapet. In the ground floor are pilasters, three windows, and to the left a doorway and a wagon entry. The windows in the middle floor have architraves with rosettes, and in the top floor they have architraves with panels between. Enclosing the basement area are railings in Art Nouveau style.	II
20 and 22 North Parade; 53.79718°N 1.75630°W	—	c. 1913	A pair of sandstone shops with Art Nouveau features. There are three storeys and attics, and each shop has three bays and a gable. In the ground floor are shop fronts and decorative pilasters, on the right is a round-arched doorway with a semicircular fanlight, and over all is a cornice curving over the doorway. In the top floor the windows have shaped aprons, the middle window in No. 22 is taller and round-arched with a keystone, and above them is a cornice, curved over this window.	II
147, 149 and 151 Sunbridge Road; 53.79457°N 1.76094°W		1914	A pair of warehouses, showrooms and offices with a steel frame and encased in red and brown sandstone. On the front are giant pilasters carrying an arcade of round-headed arches in the upper floors, panels with mosaic facing, and polished granite columns between the ground floor bays. The corners are canted, and at the top is a balustraded parapet. The entrance is through a portal with columns and a pediment.	II
Alhambra Theatre; 53.79175°N 1.75686°W		1914	The theatre, which was altered and enlarged in 1984–86, is in painted white faience and red brick. It has a triangular plan on a sloping site, and at the left bowed corner of the front is a domed rotunda on tall paired Corinthian columns. To the right of this is the later entrance in glass and steel. Further back are two square turrets with small domes. On the Morley Street front are pilasters and an entablature with a parapet and urns. The auditorium is highly decorated.	II
Bradford War Memorial, steps, wall and terminal blocks 53.79152°N 1.75636°W		1922	The war memorial is in stone, and consists of a tapering pylon surmounted by a sarcophagus. It stands on a stepped base and is flanked by bronze statues of a soldier and a sailor. At the top are Latin crosses, the shafts passing through wreathes and transforming into swords. On the base is an inscription, and there is an inscribed bronze plaque. In front of the memorial are curved steps, and at the rear is a curved screen wall ending in blocks with carved wreathed swords.	II
Masonic Hall; 53.79943°N 1.75801°W		1926–28	The hall, later known as the Connaught Rooms and used for other purposes, is steel-framed with stone walls and flat roofs. There are four storeys and eight bays, the middle two bays flanked by giant Ionic half-columns. The whole building has an entablature with Doric pilasters. The central doorway is recessed and has rusticated piers, an entablature, and a triangular pediment, and is flanked by shop fronts. The windows have metal frames and moulded surrounds, those in the first floor also with pediments. In the top floor are smaller casement windows between which are brackets carrying the frieze.	II
Telephone kiosk 53.79711°N 1.75514°W		1935	The telephone kiosk outside the County Court is of the K6 type, designed by Giles Gilbert Scott. Constructed in cast iron with a square plan and a dome, it has unperforated crowns in the top panels.	II
Pair of telephone kiosks 53.79627°N 1.75595°W		1935	The telephone kiosks are in the central island in Rawson Square. They are of the K6 type, designed by Giles Gilbert Scott. Constructed in cast iron with a square plan and a dome, they have unperforated crowns in the top panels.	II
Sunwin House; 53.79374°N 1.75678°W		1935–36	A department store with a steel frame, walls in brick faced with York stone, and a concrete roof. There are four storeys and two basement storeys, with the main front along Sunbridge Road, angled near the mid-point. Each storey contains continuous glazing. At the corner and at the mid-point are semicircular turrets with glazed bands and surmounted by recessed square towers. The main entrances are in the bases of the turrets. On Goodwin Street is a short front with a projecting bay containing a full-height stair window at the end.	II
