= Bobby's Girl (song) =

1962 single by Marcie Blane

Single by Marcie Blane
- B-side: "A Time to Dream"
- Released: September 28, 1962
- Genre: Pop rock
- Length: 2:15
- Label: Seville 45-120
- Songwriters: Gary Klein, Henry Hoffman
- Producer: Marvin Holtzman

Marcie Blane singles chronology
"Bobby's Girl" (1962)	"What Does a Girl Do" (1963)

"Bobby's Girl" is a song and single written by Gary Klein and Henry Hoffman. The original was performed by American teenage singer Marcie Blane, and became a No. 3 hit on the US charts. A version by British singer Susan Maughan was released in the UK less than a month later, coincidentally also reaching No. 3 on the UK charts. Both Blane and Maughan are one-hit wonders; for both these artists, "Bobby's Girl" marked their only appearance on a national top 40 chart.

== Marcie Blane version ==
Blane's version of the song was released in the United States in August 1962. It has a spoken introduction and a backing refrain of "You're not a kid anymore" and was popular with the American teenage audience. It entered the charts in October and made the Top 10 within a month, reaching No. 3 on the Billboard Hot 100 by December, where it stayed for four weeks. It reached No. 2 on the Cash Box chart, staying on the charts for nineteen weeks, and made Blane (very briefly) the top-selling female singer in the US.

=== Chart history ===
==== Weekly charts ====
Chart (1962–1963)	Peak position
Canada (CHUM) Hit Parade	3
New Zealand (Lever Hit Parade)	5
Sweden (Kvällstoppen)	1
Sweden (Tio i Topp)	1
U.S. Billboard Hot 100	3
U.S. Cash Box Top 100	2

==== Year-end charts ====
Chart (1963)	Rank
U.S. Cash Box	49

== Susan Maughan version ==
"Bobby's Girl"

Single by Susan Maughan
- B-side: "Come a Little Closer"
- Released: October 1962
- Genre: Pop rock
- Length: 2:15
- Label: Philips 326544 BF
- Songwriters: Gary Klein, Henry Hoffman

Susan Maughan singles chronology
"Baby Doll Twist" (1962)	"Bobby's Girl" (1962)	"Mama Do The Twist" (1962)

Susan Maughan's cover version was released in the UK, also in 1962. It featured Wally Stott and his orchestra and chorus. Substantially re-arranged from Blane's original, Maughan's version dropped the spoken word intro, and had a more sophisticated, less 'teen-age' sound. It spent nineteen weeks on the UK's Record Retailer chart, peaking at No. 3.

=== Chart history ===
Chart (1962–1963)	Peak position
UK Singles Chart	3
Ireland IRMA	3
Israeli Singles Chart	3
New Zealand (Lever Hit Parade)	6
Norway VG-lista	6

== Other versions ==
=== Tracey Ullman version ===
In 1983 Tracey Ullman released a version of "Bobby's Girl" on the album You Broke My Heart in 17 Places and as a single. Ullman's version reached No. 45 in West Germany.

=== The Copstars version ===
In 2001, members of the West Midlands Police force released a version in aid of the John Taylor Hospice in Birmingham. Lead vocals on the song was by Hayley Evetts and comedian Joe Pasquale.

=== Foreign-language versions ===
- 1963 : Swedish artist Lil Malmkvist did a version in German (Ariola AT 10 106). It reached No. 16 at the Musikmarkt Top 50-list.
