= Alhambra Theatre, Bradford =

Theatre in Bradford, West Yorkshire, England

Coordinates: 53°47′30″N 1°45′25″W

- Alhambra Theatre in 2026
- Interactive map of Alhambra Theatre, Bradford
- Address: Morley Street; Bradford; England
- Owner: Bradford City Council (General manager-Adam Renton)
- Capacity: 1,456
- Type: Professional Theatre
- Current use: Theatre

Construction
- Opened: 1914
- Rebuilt: 1984–1986
- Years active: 1914–present
- Architects: Chadwick and Watson of Leeds

Website
- https://www.bradford-theatres.co.uk/venues/the-alhambra-theatre

Listed Building – Grade II
- Official name: Alhambra Theatre, Princes Way BD1
- Designated: 28 March 1974
- Reference no.: 1314554

The Alhambra Theatre is a theatre in Bradford, West Yorkshire, England, named after the Alhambra palace in Granada, Spain, which was the place of residence of the Emir of the Emirate of Granada. It was built in 1913 at a cost of £20,000 for theatre impresario Francis Laidler, and opened on Wednesday 18 March 1914. In 1964, Bradford City Council bought the Alhambra for £78,900 and in 1974, it was designated a Grade II listed building. It underwent extensive refurbishment in 1986. Today it is a receiving house for large-scale touring theatre of all types and the main house seats 1,456.

== History ==
Francis Laidler, who already owned two music halls in Bradford, opened the new Alhambra Theatre in 1914. The architects were Chadwick and Watson, who described it as "English renaissance of the Georgian period".

== Building ==
The building is recognisable for its large domed turret with giant-paired Corinthian columns, an iconic landmark on the Bradford skyline together with the complementary domes on the adjacent, Bradford Live building. Behind this, the building is stepped up, culminating in tall square towers with smaller domes.

It is situated on a sloping site amongst other Bradford landmarks – the National Media Museum, aforementioned Bradford Live, the former Windsor Baths building and Bradford City Park. The entrance to the building is on the corner on the other side of the building to the dome and has a distinctive iron and glass canopy.

Elsewhere, the exterior is faced in white faience, which has now been painted white and grey. The faience was produced by Gibbs and Canning of Tamworth.

Inside, the auditorium consists of three tiers - stalls, dress circle and upper circle. It is highly decorated with plasterwork. There is moulded plasterwork to the curved balcony fronts and elliptically bowed balconies to the boxes, which are situated in round arched openings with giant fluted Corinthian columns. The circular auditorium ceiling is decorated and has a small octagonal dome to the centre. There is a rectangular proscenium arch.

== Organisation ==
The Alhambra theatre is part of Bradford Theatres, which also includes St. George's Concert Hall, the studio, and King's Hall Ilkley. It is owned by City of Bradford Metropolitan District Council

The theatre is a member of UK Theatre, and also the Dance Consortium, a group of theatres who collaborate to bring international dance theatre to the UK.

== Facilities ==
=== Main house ===
The 1,400 capacity main house is a major touring venue and hosts a wide range of stage shows from ballet and opera to variety and comedy, musicals, drama and the annual pantomime. Regular visits are made from prestigious companies such as Opera North, the Royal Shakespeare Company, Birmingham Royal Ballet, Northern Ballet Theatre, Matthew Bourne's New Adventures and the Royal National Theatre to complement spectacular West End musicals such as Grease, Miss Saigon, Whistle Down the Wind and The Phantom of the Opera. Wicked started its world tour at the Alhambra Theatre in 2016

=== The Studio ===
The complex also houses a smaller studio theatre, with seating for 200, or standing room for 300. This is mainly used for new comedy, including tours by Alun Cochrane, Tom Stade & Patrick Monahan.

=== Catering ===
In 2012 a new restaurant, called "Restaurant 1914" was opened at the top of the Alhambra theatre, with views overlooking Bradford City Park. Restaurant 1914 was constructed at a cost of £250,000 and has more than doubled the dining capacity of the theatre.

== In popular culture ==
- The Alhambra appears in the 211 second long, short film Bradford Silver Jubilation (1935). It's decorated in flags and buntin to celebrate George V's Silver Jubilee.
- On Christmas Eve 1973, Junior Showtime did a Babes in the Wood pantomime episode at The Alhambra. It starred Bobby Bennett as Robin Hood, Peter Goodwright as Alan A'Dale, Susan Maughan as Maid Marian, Roy Rolland as Nanny Riley, John Gower as the Sheriff of Nottingham, Eddie Large as Private Large, Syd Little as Private Little, Colin Prince as Little John, Norman Collier as Will Scarlett, Bonnie Langford as Babe Tilly, and Mark Curry as Babe Willy.
- The Dresser (1983 film) starring Albert Finney and Tom Courtenay was filmed at The Alhambra, as the main location of the film.
- In March and April 1987, Tom O'Connor spent 5 days presenting The Tom O'Connor Roadshow live from The Alhambra stage, while his co-host Debbie Greenwood explored the rest of the city.
- Testimony (1988 film) starring Ben Kingsley filmed at The Alhambra.
- Kate Nash's music video for Mouthwash was filmed at The Alhambra on the 20 August 2007, and had earlier filmed at the Bristol Hippodrome in late July or early August 2007. Nash performed with the touring cast of Starlight Express on both occasions, who learned two new routines for the video. It features Nash backstage of the theatres, and on the theatre stages playing the piano while the show is being performed.
- In 2020 BBC Three's reality magic series School of Hard Tricks, consisted of 6 Bradfordians learning how to do magic in just three weeks, which they then performed in front of a live audience at The Alhambra.

== See also ==
- Listed buildings in Bradford (City Ward)

== Bibliography ==
- Sheeran, George (2005). The Buildings of Bradford. Stroud, Gloucestershire: Tempus. ISBN 0-7524-3584-1.
