= Hand a Handkerchief to Helen =

"Had a Handkerchief To Helen"

Single by Susan Maughan
- B-side: "I'm a Lonely One Too"
- Released: 1963
- Genre: Pop
- Label: Philips Records 326532
- Songwriters: Fred Tobias, Paul Evans

Susan Maughan singles chronology
"She's New To You" (1963)	"Had a Handkerchief To Helen" (1963)	"Make Him Mine" (1964)

"Hand a Handkerchief to Helen" is a song and single written by Fred Tobias and Paul Evans and performed by British singer Susan Maughan. It featured Wally Stott and his orchestra and chorus. It was released in 1963 and reached 41 on the UK Charts, staying in the chart for three weeks.
