= Susan Maughan =

English singer (born 1938)

- Born: Marian Maughan; 1 July 1938 (age 88); Consett, County Durham, England
- Genres: Pop
- Occupation: Singer
- Instrument: Vocals
- Years active: 1953–present
- Labels: Philips, Ember
- Spouses: Nicolas Teller (m. 1965); Nick Leigh (m. ? - present)

Susan Maughan (born Marian Maughan; 1 July 1938) is an English singer, chiefly active in the 1950s and 1960s. Her most famous and successful song, "Bobby's Girl" (a cover of the Marcie Blane single), reached number three on the UK Singles Chart in December 1962. It also reached number six on the Norwegian VG-lista charts.

== Career ==
Susan Maughan was born Marian Maughan on July 1, 1938 in Consett, England. In 1953, her family moved to Birmingham. She started work as a shorthand typist.In September 1961 Susan became the featured singer with the Ray Ellington Quartet after finding an advertisement for a band looking for a female vocalist. Her rise to stardom occurred in September 1962 when she recorded the song "Bobby's Girl". The song became an instant success, resulting in Susan pursuing a solo career as a singer.

In early 1963, following the success of "Bobby's Girl", Maughan recorded additional songs which became minor hits such as "Hand a Handkerchief to Helen" and "She's New To You". Around the same time, she released her first album on Philips I Wanna Be Bobby's Girl But.... Later that year, she appeared at the 1963 Royal Variety Performance, as well as landing a role in the 1963 film What a Crazy World. Maughan also appeared in the film Pop Gear (1965) and sang the title song for the second Charles Vine low-budget superspy film, Where the Bullets Fly (1966). In 1971, she appeared in series five of the Morecambe & Wise BBC television series, having previously appeared on their 1962 ATV series. She also replaced Clodagh Rodgers in the play Meet Me in London at London's Adelphi Theatre.

In 1974, Maughan recorded the song "Time", from the film Dirty Mary, Crazy Larry, which she sang during her appearance that same year on the Wheeltappers and Shunters Social Club TV show.

From 1983 to 1988 she appeared in various Emu TV programmes in the segment 'Boggles Kingdom' alongside Carl Wayne and Rod Hull. The segment revolved around Rod's ancestor King Boggle, his sister Princess Hortensia, played by Maughan and servant, Odd Job John who were trapped in medieval times. Maughan performed several solo songs during the show, including a rendition of "Let Me Entertain You" from the musical Gypsy, as well as several group numbers.

== Personal life ==
In February 1965, Maughan married advertising executive Nicolas Teller. As of 2004 she was living in Eastbourne with her second husband Nick Leigh, a theatre director.

== Discography ==
=== Studio albums ===
- Swingin' Susan (Philips,1963)
- I Wanna Be Bobby's Girl But… (Philips, 1963)
- Sentimental Susan (Philips, 1964)
- Hey Look Me Over (Philips, 1967)
- This Is Me (Ember Records, 1974)
- Superlady (Performance Records, 1979)
- Let's Go Round Again

=== Compilations ===
- Bobby's Girl (Wing Records - 1967)
- I Want To Be Bobby's Girl (Gold Dust Records - 1996)
- The Best Of Susan Maughan (Spectrum Music - 1999)

=== UK singles ===
- "I've Got To Learn To Forget" – (1962) – Philips
- "Baby Doll Twist" – (1962) – Philips
- "Mama Do The Twist" – (1962) – Philips
- "Bobby's Girl" – (1962) – Philips – UK No. 3, Ireland No. 6, Israel No. 5
- "Hand a Handkerchief to Helen" – (1963) – Philips – UK No.41
- "The Verdict Is Guilty" – (1963) – Philips
- "She's New To You" – (1963) – Philips – UK No.45
- "Hey Lover" – (1964) – Philips
- "Kiss Me Sailor" – (1964) – Philips
- "Little Things Mean A Lot" – (1964) – Philips
- "That Other Place" – (1964) – Philips
- "Make Him Mine" – (1964) – Philips
- "You Can Never Get Away From Me" – (1965) – Philips
- "When She Walks Away" – (1965) – Philips
- "Poor Boy" – (1965) – Philips
- "Where the Bullets Fly" – (1966) – Philips
- "Don't Go Home" – (1966) – Philips
- "Come And Get Me" – (1966) – Philips
- "To Him" – (1967) – (Philips)
- "I Remember Loving You" – (1968) – Philips
- "Cable Car For Two" – (1968) – Philips
- "We Really Go Together" – (1969) – Philips
- "Time (Is Such A Funny Thing)" – (1974) – Ember
- "El Bimbo" – (1975) – Ember

== See also ==
- The Wheeltappers and Shunters Social Club
- Helen Shapiro
