= 2026 Manchester City Council election =

2026 English local government election

- 7 May 2026

32 out of 96 seats to Manchester City Council 49 seats needed for a majority
- Registered: 399,451
- Turnout: 32.5%
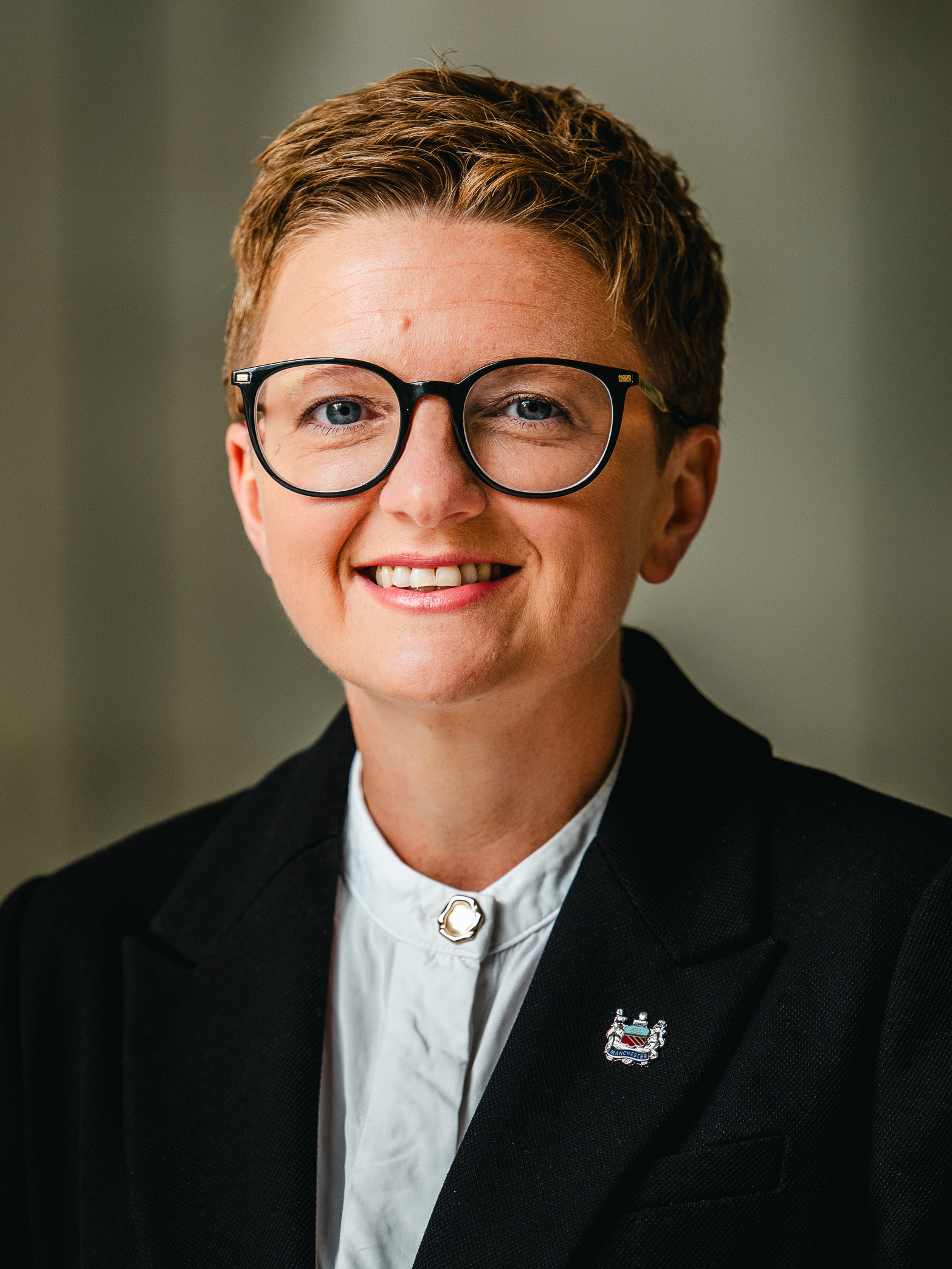

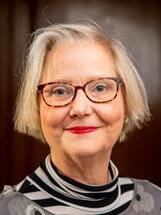

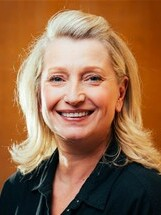

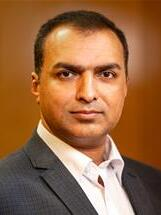
	First party	Second party	Third party
Leader	Bev Craig	Astrid Johnson	Sian Astley
Party	Labour	Green	Reform
Leader's seat	Burnage	Woodhouse Park	Ran in Baguley (won)
Last election	87 seats, 53.7%	3 seats, 17.5%	Did not contest
Seats before	87	4	0
Seats won	6	18	7
Seats after	63	21	7
Seat change	▼24	▲17	▲7
Popular vote	39,928	48,218	21,455
Percentage	30.7%	37.1%	16.5%
Swing	▼23.0pp	▲19.6pp	▲16.5pp
	Fourth party	Fifth party
Leader	John Leech	Shahbaz Sarwar
Party	Liberal Democrats	Workers Party
Leader's seat	Didsbury West	Longsight
Last election	4 seats, 10.4%	1 seat, 5.5%
Seats before	4	1
Seats won	1	0
Seats after	4	1
Seat change	Steady	Steady
Popular vote	10,627	3,225
Percentage	8.2%	2.5%
Swing	▼2.2pp	▼3.0pp
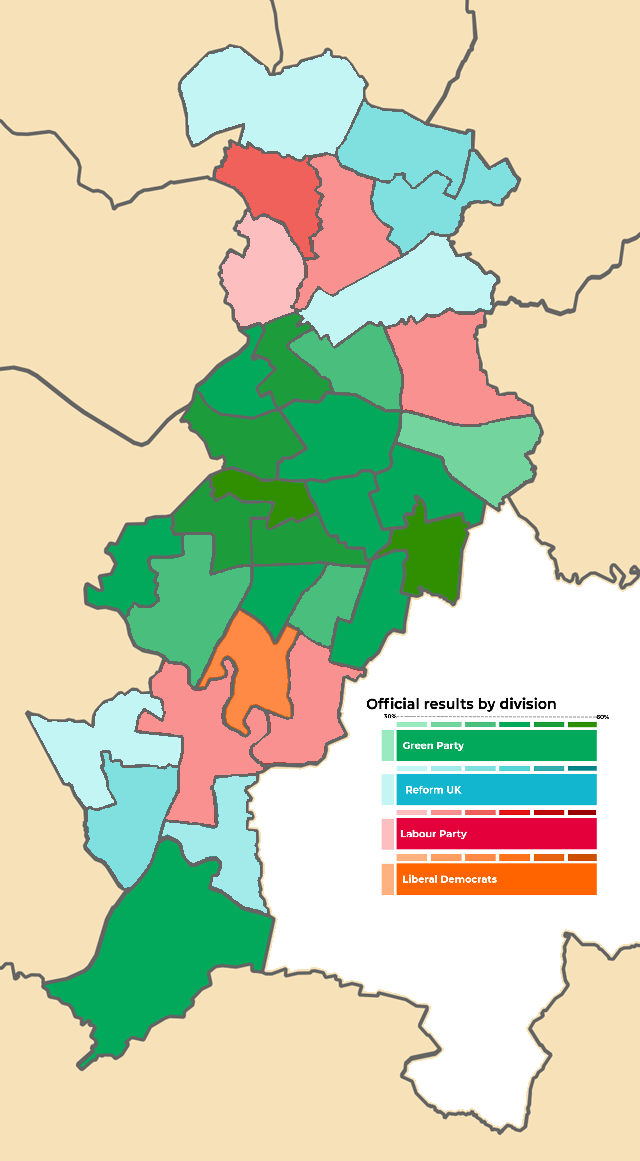
Leader before election
Bev Craig
Labour
Leader after election
Bev Craig
Labour

The 2026 Manchester City Council election took place on Thursday 7 May 2026, alongside other local elections across the United Kingdom. One third of councillors (32) on Manchester City Council were up for election.

The Green Party won 18 of the 32 seats being contested and also took the most votes. Labour retained control of the council, but with a significantly reduced majority.

== Background ==
=== History ===
In the previous election in 2024, Labour won 30 of the 33 seats up for election with 53% of the vote, the Green Party won 1 seat with 17% of the vote, the Liberal Democrats won 1 seat with 10% of the vote and the Workers Party won 1 seat with 5% of the vote.

Candidates up for re-election in 2026 were those who were elected in 2022.

=== Changes since the last election ===
In September 2024, a by-election was held in Baguley following the resignation of Labour Councillor Phil Brickell due to his election as MP for Bolton West. This election was won by Labour's Munaver Rasul.

Muqaddasah Bano was suspended from the Labour Party in July 2025 following complaints from members.

In September 2025, a by-election was held in Woodhouse Park following the resignation of Green Councillor Anastasia Wiest. This election was won by Zoe Marlow of the Green Party.

In April 2026, Independent Councillor Amna Abdullatif joined the Green Party, after previously resigning from the Labour Party in October 2023.

== Electoral process ==
The council elects its councillors in thirds, with a third being up for election every year for three years, with no election in the fourth year. Councillors are elected via first-past-the-post voting, with each ward represented by three councillors, one elected in each election year to serve a four-year term.

All registered electors (British, Irish, Commonwealth and European Union citizens) living in Manchester aged 18 or over will be entitled to vote in the election. People who live at two addresses in different councils, such as university students with different term-time and holiday addresses, are entitled to be registered for and vote in elections in both local authorities. Voting in-person at polling stations will take place from 07:00 to 22:00 on election day, and voters are able to apply for postal votes or proxy votes in advance of the election.

== Summary ==
=== Election result ===
2026 Manchester City Council election
Party	This election				Full council			This election		
Party	Candidates	Seats	Net	Seats %	Other	Total	Total %	Votes	Votes %	+/−
Labour	32 (Note: Includes five Labour and Co-operative Party candidates.)	6 (Note: Includes one Labour and Co-operative Party elect)	▼24	18.8	57	63	65.6	39,928 (Note: Includes 7,594 votes cast for Labour and Co-operative Party candidates.)	31.1 (Note: Includes 5.9% of the vote cast for Labour and Co-operative Party candidates.)	▼22.6
Green	32	18	▲17	56.3	3	21	21.9	48,218	36.8	▲19.3
Reform	32	7	▲7	21.9	0	7	7.3	21,455	16.7	New
Liberal Democrats	32	1	0	3.1	3	4	4.2	10,627	8.3	▼2.1
Workers Party	11	0	0	0.0	1	1	1.0	3,207	2.5	▼3.0
Conservative	25	0	0	0.0	0	0	0.0	3,657	2.9	▼3.2
Independent	5	0	0	0.0	0	0	0.0	1,993	1.6	▼2.9
TUSC	2	0	0	0.0	0	0	0.0	86	0.1	0.0
SDP	3	0	0	0.0	0	0	0.0	57	<0.1	New
Communist	1	0	0	0.0	0	0	0.0	30	<0.1	New
Communist League	1	0	0	0.0	0	0	0.0	12	<0.1	New
Total	176	32	0	100.0	64	96	100.0	129,270	100.0	
Rejected ballots								490	0.4	
Total								129,760	100.0	
Turnout/registered electors								32.5	399,451	

== Incumbents ==
Ward	Incumbent councillor			Winner	
Ward	Name	Party	Re-standing	Name	Party
Ancoats & Beswick	Irene Robinson	Labour	Yes	Hussayn Salem	Green
Ardwick	Tina Hewitson	Labour	Yes	Alex-Salik Imran	Green
Baguley	Paul Andrews	Labour	Yes	Sian Astley	Reform
Brooklands	Susan Cooley	Labour	Yes	Steven Hodgkiss	Reform
Burnage	Murtaza Iqbal	Labour	Yes	Asma Alam	Green
Charlestown	Veronica Kirkpatrick	Labour	Yes	Dylan Evans	Reform
Cheetham	Naeem Hassan	Labour	Yes	Naeem Hassan	Labour
Chorlton	John Hacking	Labour	Yes	Chantal Kerr-Sheppard	Green
Chorlton Park	Joanna Midgley	Labour	Yes	Grace Worrall	Green
Clayton & Openshaw	Thomas Robinson	Labour	Yes	Thomas Robinson	Labour
Crumpsall	Jawad Amin	Labour	Yes	Jawad Amin	Labour
Deansgate	Joan Davies	Labour	Yes	Sarah Wakefield	Green
Didsbury East	Andrew Simcock	Labour	Yes	Andrew Simcock	Labour
Didsbury West	John Leech	Liberal Democrats	Yes	John Leech	Liberal Democrats
Fallowfield	Ali Ilyas	Labour	Yes	Sufyaan Jasat	Green
Gorton & Abbey Hey	John Hughes	Labour	Yes	Chris Ogden	Green
Harpurhey	Sandra Collins	Labour	No	David Godfrey	Labour
Higher Blackley	Olusegun Ogunbambo	Labour	Yes	Martin Power	Reform
Hulme	Lee-Ann Igbon	Labour	Yes	Bernard Ekbery	Green
Levenshulme	Dzidra Noor	Labour	Yes	Fesl Reza-Khan	Green
Longsight	Abid Chohan	Labour	Yes	Asif Ranjha	Green
Miles Platting & Newton Heath	Carmine Grimshaw	Labour	Yes	Tom Lane	Reform
Moss Side	Erinma Bell	Labour	Yes	Thirza Asanga-Rae	Green
Moston	Paula Appleby	Labour	Yes	Blake Fisher	Reform
Northenden	Angela Moran	Labour	Yes	Angela Moran	Labour
Old Moat	Suzannah Reeves	Labour	Yes	Sam Easterby-Smith	Green
Piccadilly	Adele Douglas	Labour	No	Ross Steven	Green
Rusholme	Rabnawaz Akbar	Labour	Yes	Shams Syed	Green
Sharston	Thomas Judge	Labour	No	David McCullough	Reform
Whalley Range	Aftab Razaq	Labour	Yes	Ati Zafar	Green
Withington	Angela Gartside	Labour	Yes	Beth Hartness	Green
Woodhouse Park	Astrid Johnson	Green	Yes	Astrid Johnson	Green

== Ward results ==
\* denotes incumbent councillor seeking re-election

An asterisk (*) indicates the incumbent councillor.

=== Ancoats and Beswick ===
Ancoats and Beswick
Party	Candidate	Votes	%	±%
Green	Hussayn Salem	1,776	42.0	▲35.4
Liberal Democrats	Luke Allan	1,095	25.9	▼17.1
Labour	Irene Robinson*	785	18.5	▼27.9
Reform	Elizabeth Drinkwater	498	11.8	New
Conservative	Saadmun Abdullah	78	1.8	▼1.6
Majority		681	16.1	N/A
Turnout		4,238	32.3	▲2.2
Rejected ballots		6	0.1	▼0.4
Registered electors		13,138		
Green gain from Labour		Swing	▲31.6	

=== Ardwick ===
Ardwick
Party	Candidate	Votes	%	±%
Green	Alex-Salik Imran	1,607	45.8	▲37.7
Labour	Tina Hewitson*	1,128	32.1	▼46.7
Reform	Charlie Stott	295	8.4	New
Workers Party	Saqib Athar	170	4.8	New
Conservative	Princetta Nicol	161	4.6	▼3.6
Liberal Democrats	Joe Lynch	119	3.4	▼0.8
Communist	Alex Francis-Palmer	30	0.9	New
Majority		479	13.6	N/A
Turnout		3,540	26.9	▲3.1
Rejected ballots		30	0.8	▼0.7
Registered electors		13,171		
Green gain from Labour		Swing	▲42.2	

=== Baguley ===
Baguley
Party	Candidate	Votes	%	±%
Reform	Sian Astley	1,329	40.9	New
Labour Co-op	Paul Andrews*	906	27.9	▼37.7
Green	Grace Buczkowska	597	18.4	▲9.7
Conservative	Luke Berry	245	7.5	▼11.7
Liberal Democrats	Bernie Ryan	122	3.8	▼1.9
TUSC	Lynn Worthington	53	1.6	New
Majority		423	13.0	N/A
Turnout		3,266	28.1	▲6.5
Rejected ballots		14	0.4	▼1.6
Registered electors		11,623		
Reform gain from Labour Co-op		Swing	▲39.3	

=== Brooklands ===
Brooklands
Party	Candidate	Votes	%	±%
Reform	Steven Hodgkiss	1,198	32.3	New
Labour	Sue Cooley*	1,190	32.0	▼28.0
Green	Amy Bower	767	20.7	▲9.4
Conservative	Stephen Carlton-Woods	377	10.2	▼12.7
Liberal Democrats	Martha O'Donoghue	182	4.9	▼0.6
Majority		8	0.2	N/A
Turnout		3,724	33.5	▲8.6
Rejected ballots		10	0.3	▼1.3
Registered electors		11,133		
Reform gain from Labour		Swing	▲30.1	

=== Burnage ===
Burnage
Party	Candidate	Votes	%	±%
Green	Asma Alam	2,257	45.8	▲30.4
Labour	Murtaza Iqbal*	1,446	29.3	▼37.5
Reform	Heather McDonagh	837	17.0	New
Liberal Democrats	Michael Nash-Whitmore	152	3.1	▼6.5
Workers Party	Muhammad Tahir	110	2.2	New
Conservative	Bhupinder Kumar	107	2.2	▼5.3
Independent	Tenisha Nantume	24	0.5	New
Majority		811	16.4	N/A
Turnout		4,942	36.2	▲4.1
Rejected ballots		9	0.2	▼1.1
Registered electors		13,635		
Green gain from Labour		Swing	▲34.0	

=== Charlestown ===
Charlestown
Party	Candidate	Votes	%	±%
Reform	Dylan Evans	1,566	43.6	New
Labour	Veronica Kirkpatrick*	1,202	33.5	▼36.4
Green	Ali Wood	652	18.2	▲7.3
Liberal Democrats	Charles Turner	172	4.8	▲1.4
Majority		364	10.1	N/A
Turnout		3,615	29.6	▲7.2
Rejected ballots		23	0.6	▼1.9
Registered electors		12,220		
Reform gain from Labour		Swing	▲40.0	

=== Cheetham ===
Cheetham
Party	Candidate	Votes	%	±%
Labour	Naeem Hassan*	1,398	33.7	▼49.0
Green	Brian Candeland	1,090	26.3	▲19.8
Independent	Mohammed Ali	943	22.8	New
Workers Party	Sabeena Khan	323	7.8	New
Reform	Samuel Jacob	270	6.5	New
Liberal Democrats	Roderick Morrison	121	2.9	▼0.7
Majority		308	7.4	▼68.8
Turnout		4,162	29.7	▲1.8
Rejected ballots		17	0.4	▼0.7
Registered electors		14,004		
Labour hold		Swing	▼34.4	

=== Chorlton ===
Chorlton
Party	Candidate	Votes	%	±%
Green	Chantal Kerr-Sheppard	2,549	45.4	▲28.5
Labour	John Hacking*	2,374	42.3	▼23.2
Reform	Ian Carter	295	5.3	New
Liberal Democrats	Rhona Brown	247	4.4	▼6.3
Conservative	Jorge Garcia de Bustos	147	2.6	▼1.3
Majority		175	3.1	N/A
Turnout		5,627	52.5	▲7.6
Rejected ballots		15	0.3	▼0.8
Registered electors		10,725		
Green gain from Labour		Swing	▲25.9	

=== Chorlton Park ===
Chorlton Park
Party	Candidate	Votes	%	±%
Green	Grace Worrall	2,474	40.5	▲26.5
Labour Co-op	Joanna Midgley*	2,358	38.6	▼33.9
Reform	Lee Dawson	495	8.1	New
Liberal Democrats	Jack Holliss	342	5.6	▼1.7
Conservative	Peter Gough	150	2.5	▼3.1
Workers Party	Fassah Bibi	259	4.2	New
SDP	Hamed Aden	24	0.4	New
Majority		116	1.9	N/A
Turnout		6,120	45.8	▲7.0
Rejected ballots		18	0.3	▼1.0
Registered electors		13,354		
Green gain from Labour Co-op		Swing	▲30.2	

=== Clayton and Openshaw ===
Clayton and Openshaw
Party	Candidate	Votes	%	±%
Labour	Thomas Robinson*	1,308	35.9	▼35.7
Green	Sean Duggan	1,013	27.8	▲16.7
Reform	Jacob Barlow	996	27.3	New
Conservative	Ramzi Swaray-Kella	180	4.9	▼6.1
Liberal Democrats	Zinette Bates	151	4.1	▼1.5
Majority		295	8.1	▼52.4
Turnout		3,666	26.6	▲4.0
Rejected ballots		18	0.5	▼0.8
Registered electors		13,768		
Labour hold		Swing	▼26.2	

=== Crumpsall ===
Crumpsall
Party	Candidate	Votes	%	±%
Labour	Jawad Amin*	1,425	41.3	▼31.6
Green	Robert Pollitt	1,073	31.1	▲26.0
Reform	Iftikhar Ahmed	587	17.0	New
Workers Party	Mini Majid	246	7.1	New
Liberal Democrats	Amaan Hashmi	123	3.6	▼1.0
Majority		352	10.2	▼50.3
Turnout		3,475	28.4	▼0.4
Rejected ballots		21	0.6	▼0.9
Registered electors		12,221		
Labour hold		Swing	▼28.8	

=== Deansgate ===
Deansgate
Party	Candidate	Votes	%	±%
Green	Sarah Wakefield	1,380	47.4	▲34.0
Labour	Joan Davies*	801	27.5	▼32.4
Liberal Democrats	John Bridges	380	13.0	▼3.9
Reform	David Bryan	226	7.8	▲6.1
Conservative	Daniel Bell	120	4.1	▼8.0
SDP	Connor Sanders	5	0.2	New
Majority		579	19.9	N/A
Turnout		2,922	26.7	▲2.5
Rejected ballots		10	0.3	▼1.0
Registered electors		10,966		
Green gain from Labour		Swing	▲33.2	

=== Didsbury East ===
Didsbury East
Party	Candidate	Votes	%	±%
Labour Co-op	Andrew Simcock*	2,104	37.2	▼17.4
Liberal Democrats	Bryn Coombe	1,474	26.1	▼8.2
Green	Laurence Blackwell-Jones	1,443	25.5	▲18.8
Reform	Nigel Greenhalgh	476	8.4	New
Conservative	Parveen Khan	156	2.8	▼1.2
Majority		630	11.1	▼9.2
Turnout		5,676	49.6	▲6.0
Rejected ballots		23	0.4	▼0.3
Registered electors		11,446		
Labour Co-op hold		Swing	▼4.6	

=== Didsbury West ===
Didsbury West
Party	Candidate	Votes	%	±%
Liberal Democrats	John Leech*	2,504	44.2	▼9.6
Green	Adam Snape	1,547	27.3	▲20.6
Labour	Ben Williams	1,220	21.5	▼14.8
Reform	Martin Sykes	342	6.0	New
Conservative	Barakat Elkhalifa	54	1.0	▼1.4
Majority		957	16.9	▼0.6
Turnout		5,675	46.5	▲1.7
Rejected ballots		8	0.1	▼0.7
Registered electors		12,203		
Liberal Democrats hold		Swing	▼15.1	

=== Fallowfield ===
Fallowfield
Party	Candidate	Votes	%	±%
Green	Sufyaan Jasat	1,328	52.0	▲37.0
Labour	Ali Ilyas*	710	27.8	▼43.2
Reform	Racheal Burns	293	11.5	New
Conservative	Luke Barker	105	4.1	▼3.0
Liberal Democrats	John Commons	79	3.1	▼2.9
Workers Party	Raluca Khajeh	37	1.4	New
Majority		618	24.2	N/A
Turnout		2,562	25.8	▲4.6
Rejected ballots		10	0.4	▼0.9
Registered electors		9,919		
Green gain from Labour		Swing	▲40.1	

=== Gorton and Abbey Hey ===
Gorton and Abbey Hey
Party	Candidate	Votes	%	±%
Green	Chris Ogden	1,489	36.7	▲29.6
Labour Co-op	John Hughes*	1,196	29.5	▼39.4
Reform	Paul Lajszczak	1,117	27.5	New
Liberal Democrats	Jackie Pearcey	169	4.2	▼9.4
Conservative	Shahab Raz	87	2.1	▼7.5
Majority		293	7.2	N/A
Turnout		4,071	27.8	▲4.4
Rejected ballots		13	0.3	▼1.4
Registered electors		14,667		
Green gain from Labour Co-op		Swing	▲34.5	

=== Harpurhey ===
Harpurhey
Party	Candidate	Votes	%	±%
Labour	David Godfrey	1,135	37.8	▼36.2
Reform	John David	788	26.3	New
Green	Finn White	735	24.5	▲16.5
Conservative	Gareth Brown	210	7.0	▼5.9
Liberal Democrats	Maria Turner	132	4.4	▲0.2
Majority		347	11.6	▼49.5
Turnout		3,012	22.4	▲2.0
Rejected ballots		12	0.4	▼1.1
Registered electors		13,476		
Labour hold		Swing	▼31.2	

=== Higher Blackley ===
Higher Blackley
Party	Candidate	Votes	%	±%
Reform	Martin Power	1,084	30.9	New
Labour	Olusegun Ogunbambo*	942	26.9	▼37.5
Independent	Dean Booth	710	20.3	New
Green	Brad Bowes	621	17.7	▲11.0
Liberal Democrats	Peter Matthews	146	4.2	▼1.4
Majority		142	4.1	N/A
Turnout		3,517	30.9	▲8.6
Rejected ballots		14	0.4	▼0.8
Registered electors		11,393		
Reform gain from Labour		Swing	▲34.2	

=== Hulme ===
Hulme
Party	Candidate	Votes	%	±%
Green	Bernard Ekbery	2,059	54.8	▲39.7
Labour	Lee-Ann Igbon*	1,257	33.5	▼38.3
Reform	Nigel Slack	285	7.6	New
Liberal Democrats	Robin Grayson	156	4.2	▼2.3
Majority		802	21.3	N/A
Turnout		3,773	29.0	▲4.2
Rejected ballots		16	0.4	▼0.9
Registered electors		12,993		
Green gain from Labour		Swing	▲39.0	

=== Levenshulme ===
Levenshulme
Party	Candidate	Votes	%	±%
Green	Fesl Reza-Khan	3,073	55.5	▲42.3
Labour	Dzidra Noor*	1,052	19.0	▼45.0
Workers Party	Muhammad Iqbal	649	11.7	New
Reform	Christian Sky	378	6.8	New
Independent	Jeremy Hoad	286	5.2	▼7.2
Liberal Democrats	Liaqat Ali	68	1.2	▼4.3
TUSC	Emma Woods	33	0.6	New
Majority		2,021	36.5	N/A
Turnout		5,565	38.1	▲0.8
Rejected ballots		26	0.5	▼0.6
Registered electors		14,599		
Green gain from Labour		Swing	▲43.6	

=== Longsight ===
Longsight
Party	Candidate	Votes	%	±%
Green	Asif Ranjha	2,307	47.4	▲42.1
Labour	Abid Chohan*	1,524	31.3	▼51.9
Workers Party	Tanvir Marth	460	9.5	New
Reform	Michael Chahwanda	384	7.9	New
Liberal Democrats	Kobe Bibbon	93	1.9	▼2.6
Conservative	Faran Sikandar	83	1.7	▼4.7
Communist League	Hugo Wils	12	0.2	New
Majority		783	16.1	N/A
Turnout		4,879	32.5	▼5.5
Rejected ballots		16	0.3	▼0.4
Registered electors		15,014		
Green gain from Labour		Swing	▲47.0	

=== Miles Platting and Newton Heath ===
Miles Platting and Newton Heath
Party	Candidate	Votes	%	±%
Reform	Tom Lane	1,243	34.3	New
Labour	Carmine Grimshaw*	1,166	32.2	▼40.6
Green	Pascal Checkley	884	24.4	▲14.7
Conservative	Adeyemi Ajayi	196	5.4	▼6.7
Liberal Democrats	Andrew Weston	137	3.8	▼0.9
Majority		77	0.2	N/A
Turnout		3,642	26.7	▲5.5
Rejected ballots		16	0.4	▼0.5
Registered electors		13,660		
Reform gain from Labour		Swing	▲37.5	

=== Moss Side ===
Moss Side
Party	Candidate	Votes	%	±%
Green	Thirza Asanga-Rae	2,371	56.5	▲48.7
Labour	Erinma Bell*	1,356	32.3	▼49.7
Reform	Martin McKinnon	189	4.5	New
Conservative	Jake Fountain	110	2.6	▼4.1
Workers Party	Nadia Dara	108	2.6	New
Liberal Democrats	Lynne Williams	65	1.5	▼1.3
Majority		1,015	24.2	N/A
Turnout		4,223	27.8	▲0.9
Rejected ballots		24	0.6	▼0.5
Registered electors		15,185		
Green gain from Labour		Swing	▲49.2	

=== Moston ===
Moston
Party	Candidate	Votes	%	±%
Reform	Blake Fisher	1,683	40.8	New
Labour	Paula Appleby*	1,498	36.3	▼32.6
Green	Diane Kosandiak	753	18.3	▲10.6
Liberal Democrats	Norman Lewis	188	4.6	▲0.8
Majority		185	4.5	N/A
Turnout		4,146	31.2	▲6.5
Rejected ballots		24	0.6	▼1.7
Registered electors		13,296		
Reform gain from Labour		Swing	▲36.7	

=== Northenden ===
Northenden
Party	Candidate	Votes	%	±%
Labour	Angela Moran*	1,465	38.1	▼27.6
Reform	Chris Soobhug	1,094	28.5	New
Green	Tolu Ajayi	851	22.2	▲9.3
Conservative	Stephen McHugh	253	6.6	▼9.3
Liberal Democrats	Mark Clayton	178	4.6	▼1.3
Majority		371	9.7	▼40.1
Turnout		3,851	34.3	▲8.8
Rejected ballots		10	0.3	▼1.3
Registered electors		11,214		
Labour hold		Swing	▼28.1	

=== Old Moat ===
Old Moat
Party	Candidate	Votes	%	±%
Green	Sam Easterby-Smith	1,829	48.6	▲36.4
Labour	Suzannah Reeves*	1,189	31.6	▼40.2
Reform	Kierin McCorkell	394	10.5	New
Liberal Democrats	Tracey Pook	209	5.6	▼4.1
Conservative	Sarah Haynes	115	3.1	▼2.7
SDP	Sebastian Moore	28	0.7	New
Majority		640	17.0	N/A
Turnout		3,779	34.0	▲5.9
Rejected ballots		15	0.4	▼0.6
Registered electors		11,132		
Green gain from Labour		Swing	▲38.3	

=== Piccadilly ===
Piccadilly
Party	Candidate	Votes	%	±%
Green	Ross Steven	1,684	50.9	▲29.9
Labour Co-op	Fiona Moinuddin	1,030	31.1	▼28.0
Liberal Democrats	Kaleem Askar	325	9.8	▼1.8
Reform	Peter Beckett	172	5.2	New
Conservative	Paraic Delahunt	96	2.9	▼4.9
Majority		654	19.8	N/A
Turnout		3,318	30.8	▲3.9
Rejected ballots		11	0.3	▼0.7
Registered electors		10,773		
Green gain from Labour Co-op		Swing	▲29.0	

=== Rusholme ===
Rusholme
Party	Candidate	Votes	%	±%
Green	Shams Syed	1,919	48.4	New
Labour	Rabnawaz Akbar*	1,066	26.9	▼60.0
Workers Party	Mohhamed Bilal	579	14.6	New
Reform	Norman Hesketh-Hart	155	3.9	New
Conservative	Jason McLeod	122	3.1	▼3.0
Liberal Democrats	Greg Sammons	120	3.0	▼3.2
Majority		853	21.5	N/A
Turnout		3,974	32.5	▲2.7
Rejected ballots		13	0.3	▼0.6
Registered electors		12,211		
Green gain from Labour		Swing	▲54.2	

=== Sharston ===
Sharston
Party	Candidate	Votes	%	±%
Reform	David McCullough	1,203	38.2	New
Labour	Richard Caulfield	1,009	32.1	▼36.4
Green	Peter Searby	577	18.3	▲10.2
Conservative	Gary Curran	226	7.2	▼9.1
Liberal Democrats	Paul Jones	132	4.2	▼2.5
Majority		194	6.2	N/A
Turnout		3,161	26.8	▲5.3
Rejected ballots		14	0.4	▼1.0
Registered electors		11,786		
Reform gain from Labour		Swing	▲37.3	

=== Whalley Range ===
Whalley Range
Party	Candidate	Votes	%	±%
Green	Ati Zafar	2,498	53.9	▲32.8
Labour	Aftab Razaq*	1,407	30.3	▼37.7
Workers Party	Sameera Ashraf	266	5.7	New
Reform	Lee Montague-Trenchard	206	4.4	New
Liberal Democrats	Seb Bate	135	2.9	▼2.2
Conservative	Andrew Chadwick	124	2.7	▼2.4
Majority		1,091	23.5	N/A
Turnout		4,653	38.2	▲3.7
Rejected ballots		17	0.4	▼0.7
Registered electors		12,188		
Green gain from Labour		Swing	▲35.3	

=== Withington ===
Withington
Party	Candidate	Votes	%	±%
Green	Beth Hartness	1,604	40.8	▲31.4
Liberal Democrats	April Preston	1,056	26.9	▼12.9
Labour	Angela Gartside*	843	21.5	▼26.0
Reform	Charlie Southwood	362	9.2	New
Conservative	Sarah Garcia de Bustos	64	1.6	▼1.1
Majority		548	13.9	N/A
Turnout		3,937	36.6	▲3.4
Rejected ballots		8	0.2	▼0.6
Registered electors		10,758		
Green gain from Labour		Swing	▲28.7	

=== Woodhouse Park ===
Woodhouse Park
Party	Candidate	Votes	%	±%
Green	Astrid Johnson*	1,411	46.4	▼3.3
Reform	Brian O'Neil	1,015	33.4	New
Labour	Roger Beattie	438	14.4	▼28.1
Conservative	Eric Houghton	91	3.0	▼2.9
Liberal Democrats	Anna Coombe	55	1.8	▲0.1
Independent	Emily Chomicz	30	1.0	New
Majority		396	13.0	▲5.8
Turnout		3,049	26.3	▲3.0
Rejected ballots		9	0.3	▼0.6
Registered electors		11,580		
Green hold		Swing	▼18.4	

== Post-election changes ==
- In July 2026, Shabaz Sarwar (Longsight), who was elected for the Workers Party in 2024, joined the Labour Party.

=== Burnage ===
The by-election was triggered by the resignation of Labour councillor and Leader of Manchester City Council Bev Craig, following her election as Mayor of Greater Manchester.

Burnage by-election, 10th September 2026
Party	Candidate	Votes	%	±%
Labour	Carl Austin-Behan	1,365	42.1	▼11.1
Green	Daoud Nawaz	1,037	32.0	▲12.8
Workers Party	Gaz Ranjha	466	14.4	▼2.3
Reform	Heather McDonagh	315	9.7	New
Liberal Democrats	Abdullah Vavdiwala	31	1.0	▼4.0
Conservative	Bhupinder Kumar	27	0.8	▼3.8
Majority		328	10.1	▼23.9
Rejected ballots		13	0.4	▲0.2
Turnout		3,254	23.6	▼12.6
Registered electors		13,815		
Labour hold		Swing	▼12.0	

=== Harpurhey ===
The by-election was triggered by the death of Labour councillor Pat Karney.

It will be held on 26 November 2026, with the list of candidates having been published on 2 November 2026.

Harpurhey by-election: 26 November 2026
Party	Candidate	Votes	%	±%
Reform	Ian Carter			
Green	Sean Duggan			
Independent	Declan Gleeson			
Restore	James Harvie			
Conservative	Sarah Haynes			
Liberal Democrats	Peter Matthews			
Labour	Abdul Sarfraz			
Majority				
Turnout				
		Swing		
