= Deansgate (ward) =

- Electoral ward
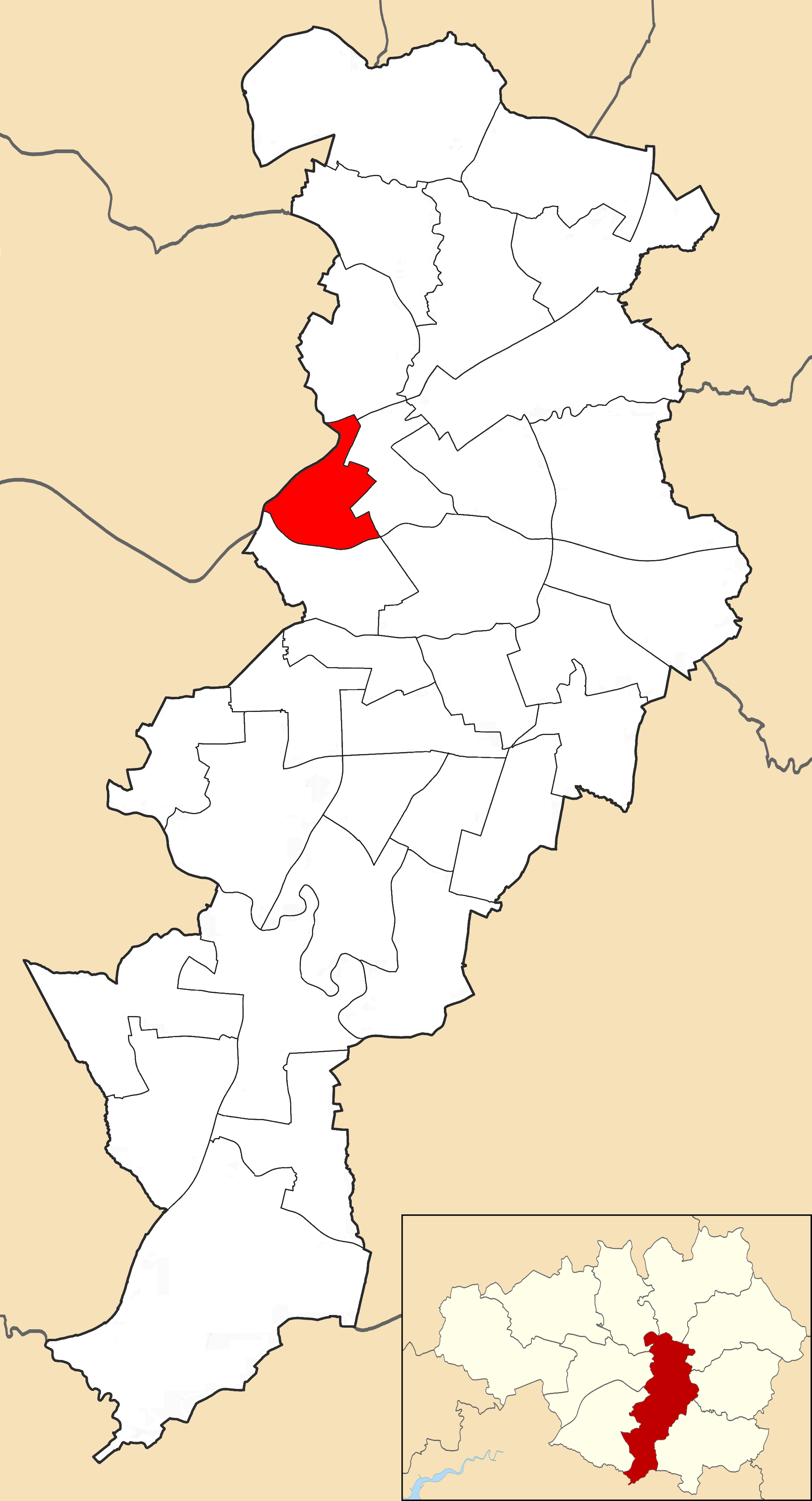
- Deansgate electoral ward within Manchester City Council

- Coat of arms
- Motto: By wisdom and effort
- Interactive map of Deansgate
- Coordinates: 53.4784°N 2.2494°W
- Country: United Kingdom
- Constituent country: England
- Region: North West England
- County: Greater Manchester
- Metropolitan borough: Manchester
- Created: December 2017
- Named after: Deansgate

Government
  - Type: Unicameral
  - Body: Manchester City Council
  - Leader of the council: Bev Craig (Labour)
  - Councillor: Sarah Wakefield (Green)
  - Councillor: Anthony McCaul (Labour)
  - Councillor: Marcus Johns (Labour)
- UK Parliamentary Constituency: Manchester Central
- Member of Parliament: Lucy Powell
- UK Parliamentary Constituency: Blackley and Broughton
- Member of Parliament: Graham Stringer

The Deansgate electoral ward of Manchester City Council was created by the Local Government Boundary Commission for England to replace part of the City Centre ward in 2018.

Different parts of this ward are represented by different MPs; the majority of the ward is in the Manchester Central constituency but the area north of the railway line through Victoria station is in the Blackley and Broughton constituency.

== Councillors ==
Three councillors serve the ward: William Jeavons, Labour (2019–23), Marcus Johns, Labour (2021–24), and Joan Davies, Labour (2018–22).

Election	Councillor	Councillor	Councillor
2018	William Jeavons (Lab)	Marcus Johns (Lab)	Joan Davies (Lab)
2019	William Jeavons (Lab)	Marcus Johns (Lab)	Joan Davies (Lab)
2021	William Jeavons (Lab)	Marcus Johns (Lab)	Joan Davies (Lab)
2022	William Jeavons (Lab)	Marcus Johns (Lab)	Joan Davies (Lab)
2023	Anthony McCaul (Labour Co-op)	Marcus Johns (Lab)	Joan Davies (Lab)
2024	Anthony McCaul (Labour Co-op)	Marcus Johns (Lab)	Joan Davies (Lab)
2026	Anthony McCaul (Labour Co-op)	Marcus Johns (Lab)	Sarah Wakefield (Grn)

indicates seat up for election.

== Elections in 2020s ==
* denotes incumbent councillor seeking re-election.

=== May 2026 ===
2026
Party	Candidate	Votes	%	±%
Green	Sarah Wakefield	1,380	47.4	▲34.0
Labour	Joan Davies*	801	27.5	▼32.4
Reform	David Bryan	380	13.0	▲11.3
Liberal Democrats	John Bridges	226	7.8	▼9.1
Conservative	Daniel Bell	120	4.1	▼4.0
SDP	Connor Sanders	5	0.2	New
Majority		579	19.9	N/A
Turnout		2,912	26.7	▲6.6
Green gain from Labour		Swing		

=== May 2024 ===
2024
Party	Candidate	Votes	%	±%
Labour Co-op	Marcus Charles Johns*	1,432	61.3	7.4 ▲
Green	Chris Ogden	490	21.0	9.9 ▲
Conservative	Jason Peter McLeod	196	8.4	1.3 ▲
Liberal Democrats	Luke Allan	186	8.0	17.3 ▼
Majority		942	40.3	
Rejected ballots		31	1.3	
Turnout		2,335	24.23	
Registered electors		9,635		
Labour hold		Swing	1.2 ▼	

=== May 2023 ===
2023
Party	Candidate	Votes	%	±%
Labour Co-op	Anthony McCaul	1,050	56.8	22.0 ▲
Green	Chris Perriam	370	20.0	2.4 ▲
Liberal Democrats	Joe Lynch	253	13.7	17.7 ▼
Conservative	Paul Wan	163	8.8	Steady
Majority		680	36.8	
Rejected ballots		14		
Turnout		1,850	21.16	
Registered electors		8,744		
Labour Co-op hold		Swing		

=== May 2022 ===
2022
Party	Candidate	Votes	%	±%
Labour	Joan Davies*	1,033	59.9	5.9 ▲
Liberal Democrats	John Bridges	292	16.9	8.3 ▼
Green	Anastasia Wiest	231	13.4	2.3 ▲
Conservative	Jamie Hoyle	139	8.1	1.0 ▲
Reform	Nick Buckley	30	1.7	0.0
Majority		741	43.0	14.3 ▲
Rejected ballots		8		
Turnout		1,725	20.1	0.7 ▲
Registered electors		8,643		
Labour hold		Swing	7.1 ▲	

=== May 2021 ===
2021
Party	Candidate	Votes	%	±%
Labour Co-op	Marcus Johns*	1,245	53.9	12.8 ▲
Liberal Democrats	John Bridges	583	25.3	0.6 ▲
Green	Chris Ogden	256	11.1	9.9 ▼
Conservative	James Flanagan	164	7.1	5.0 ▼
Women's Equality	Samantha Days	60	2.6	8.6 ▼
Majority		662	32.6	▲12.2
Rejected ballots		16	0.7	
Turnout		2,324	28.9	9.5 ▲
Registered electors		8,047		
Labour hold		Swing	6.1 ▲	

== Elections in 2010s ==
=== May 2019 ===
2019
Party	Candidate	Votes	%	±%
Labour	William Jeavons*	497	34.8	▼4.0
Liberal Democrats	John Bridges	449	31.4	▲6.7
Green	Christopher Ogden	252	17.6	▼3.4
Conservative	Connor Watson	126	8.8	▼3.9
Women's Equality	Sam Johnson	105	7.3	▼3.9
Majority		48	3.36	▼10.7
Rejected ballots		9	0.63	
Turnout		1429	19.81	▲0.43
Registered electors		7,258		
Labour hold		Swing	▼5.35	

=== May 2018 ===
2018
Party	Candidate	Votes	%	±%
Labour	Joan Davies*	782	53.3	
Labour	Marcus Johns	604	41.1	
Labour	William Jeavons	570	38.8	
Liberal Democrats	John Bridges	362	24.7	
Liberal Democrats	Gary McKenna	311	21.2	
Green	Christopher Ogden	308	21.0	
Liberal Democrats	George Rice	285	19.4	
Conservative	Russ George	196	13.4	
Conservative	Lee Evans	185	12.6	
Independent	Nick Buckley	164	11.2	
Women's Equality	Sam Johnson	164	11.2	
Conservative	Charles Latchford	151	10.3	
Independent	Giles Grover	99	6.7	
Majority		208		
Rejected ballots		2	0.026	
Turnout		1,468	19.38	
Registered electors		7,573		
Labour win (new seat)				
Labour win (new seat)				
Labour win (new seat)				

Party	Candidates	Seats Won	Votes	Vote %
Labour	3	3	1,956	46.78
Liberal Democrats	3	0	958	22.91
Conservative	3	0	532	12.72
Green	1	0	308	7.37
Independent	2	0	263	6.29
Women's Equality	1	0	164	3.92
