= Manchester Piccadilly (disambiguation) =

Manchester Piccadilly may refer to:

- Manchester Piccadilly station, a railway station in England
- Manchester Piccadilly Gardens bus station, England
- Piccadilly Gardens, green space in Manchester, England
- Piccadilly Gardens tram stop on Manchester Metrolink
- Piccadilly Radio, a former name of Greatest Hits Manchester, a radio station in Manchester, England
- Piccadilly (ward), electoral ward of Manchester city council
