= Higher Blackley =

Higher Blackley, Manchester
- Electoral ward
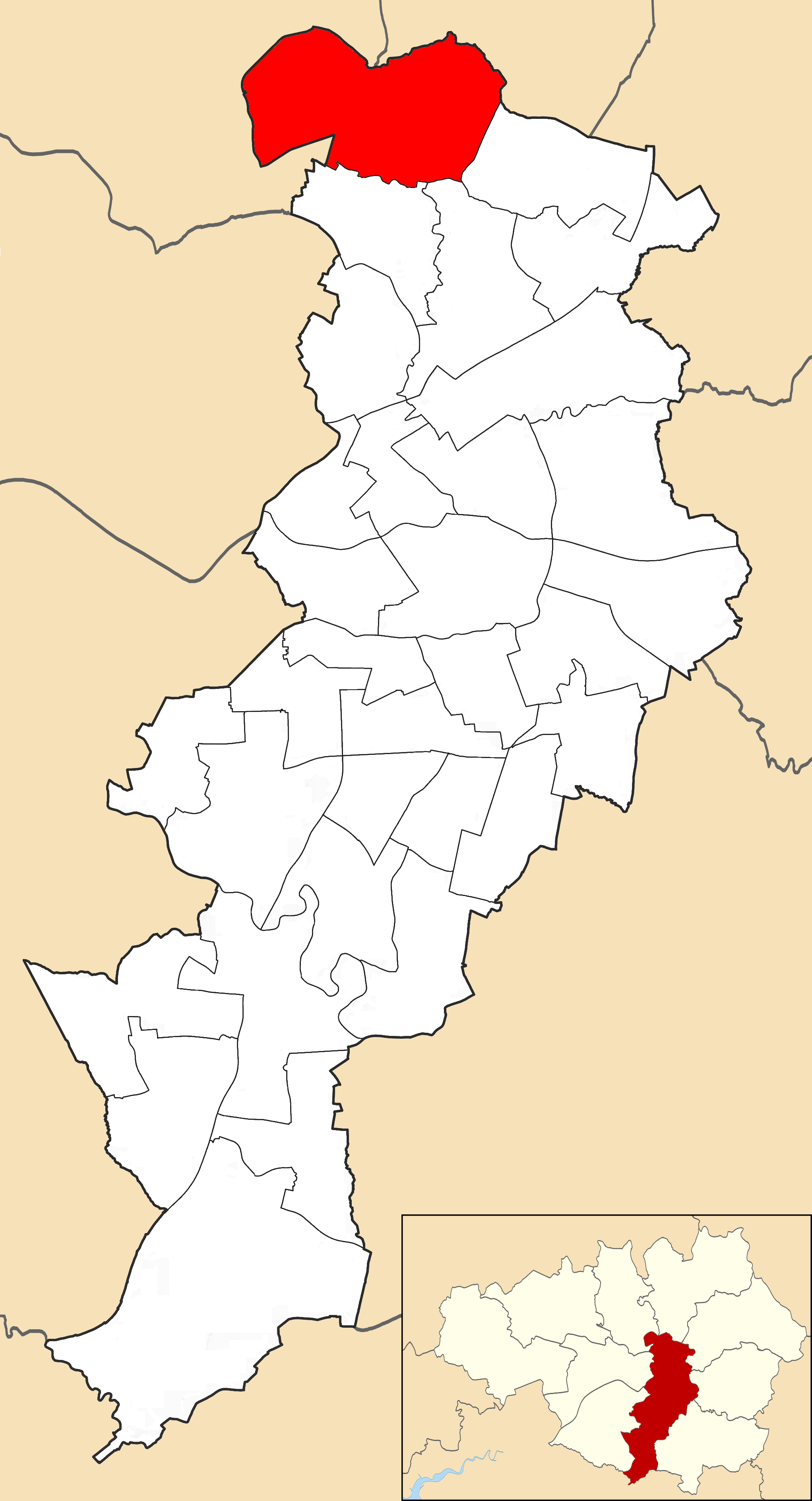
- Higher Blackley electoral ward within Manchester City Council

- Coat of arms
- Motto(s): By wisdom and effort
- Interactive map of Higher Blackley, Manchester
- Coordinates: 53.52°N 2.20°W
- Country: United Kingdom
- Constituent country: England
- Region: North West England
- County: Greater Manchester
- Metropolitan borough: Manchester
- Created: May 1973
- Named after: Higher Blackley, Manchester

Government UK Parliament constituency: Blackley and Middleton South
  - Type: Unicameral
  - Body: Manchester City Council
  - Leader of the council: Bev Craig (Labour)
  - Councillor: Martin Power (Reform)
  - Councillor: Paula Sadler (Labour)
  - Councillor: Julie Connolly (Labour)

Population
  - Total: 11,688
- Area and population statistics from the 2011 Census

Higher Blackley is an electoral district or ward in the north of the City of Manchester, England. The population of this ward at the 2011 census was 11,688.

Heaton Park, one of Europe's largest parks, is in this ward.

A new "education village" has been constructed in Higher Blackley, including a "learning resource centre" containing a library and IT facilities with specialist facilities including Science, Humanities and English. The project was occupied in stages, with Our Lady's RC High School and North Ridge SEN occupying the building by January 2009, followed by Meade Hill ESBD in July 2009.

In 2014, a report from Open Society Foundations described the Higher Blackley ward as " a strong and often supportive community with a sense of identity and belonging based on solid social bonds and connections ... a community that had significant pockets of deprivation alongside areas of relative affluence, a majority white working-class community which has undergone social change including increased migration into the area, and a history of far-right political activity".

== Governance ==
Higher Blackley is in the parliamentary constituency of Blackley and Middleton South. Currently two of the councillors: Paula Sadler, and Julie Connolly are members of the Labour Party and Martin Power is from Reform.

Election	Councillor	Councillor	Councillor
2004	Anna Trotman (Lab)	Harold Lyons (Lab)	Ken Barnes (Lab)
2006	Anna Trotman (Lab)	Harold Lyons (Lab)	Ken Barnes (Lab)
2007	Anna Trotman (Lab)	Harold Lyons (Lab)	Ken Barnes (Lab)
2008	Anna Trotman (Lab)	Harold Lyons (Lab)	Ken Barnes (Lab)
2010	Anna Trotman (Lab)	Harold Lyons (Lab)	Ken Barnes (Lab)
2011	Anna Trotman (Lab)	Harold Lyons (Lab)	Ken Barnes (Lab)
2012	Anna Trotman (Lab)	Harold Lyons (Lab)	Shelley Lanchbury (Lab)
2014	Anna Trotman (Lab)	Harold Lyons (Lab)	Shelley Lanchbury (Lab)
2015	Anna Trotman (Lab)	John Farrell (Lab)	Shelley Lanchbury (Lab)
By-election; 18 February 2016	Paula Sadler (Lab)	John Farrell (Lab)	Shelley Lanchbury (Lab)
May 2016	Paula Sadler (Lab)	John Farrell (Lab)	Shelley Lanchbury (Lab)
2018	Paula Sadler (Lab)	Shelley Lanchbury (Lab)	John Farrell (Lab)
2019	Paula Sadler (Lab)	Shelley Lanchbury (Lab)	John Farrell (Lab)
2021	Paula Sadler (Lab)	Shelley Lanchbury (Lab)	John Farrell (Lab)
2022	Paula Sadler (Lab)	Shelley Lanchbury (Lab)	Olusegun Ogunbambo (Lab)
2023	Paula Sadler (Lab)	Shelley Lanchbury (Lab)	Olusegun Ogunbambo (Lab)
2024	Paula Sadler (Lab)	Julie Connolly (Lab)	Olusegun Ogunbambo (Lab)
2026	Paula Sadler (Lab)	Julie Connolly (Lab)	Martin Power (Ref)

indicates seat up for re-election. indicates seat won in by-election.
