= Piccadilly (ward) =

- Electoral ward
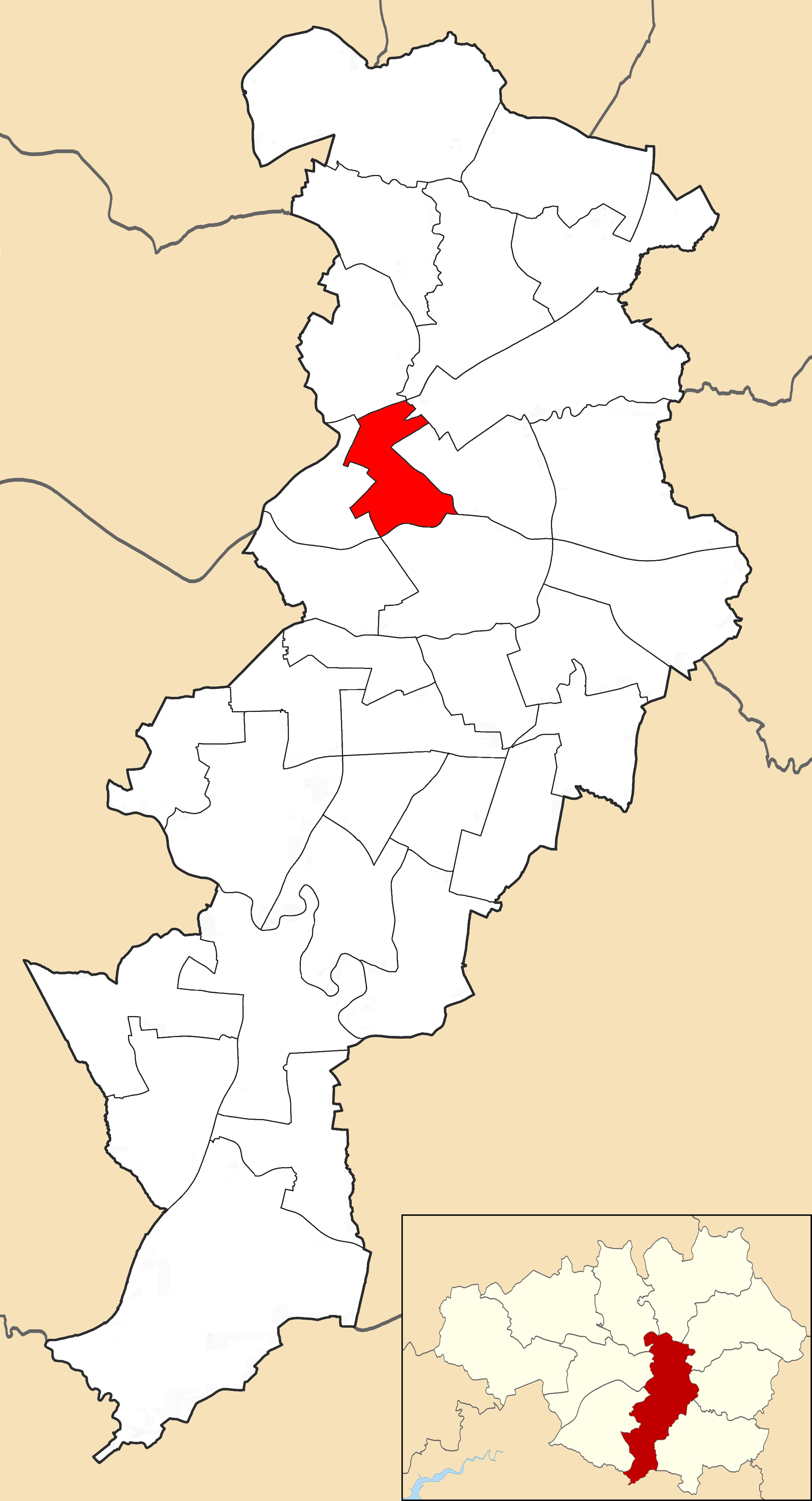
- Piccadilly electoral ward within Manchester City Council

- Coat of arms
- Motto: By wisdom and effort
- Interactive map of Piccadilly
- Coordinates: 53.4807°N 2.2340°W
- Country: United Kingdom
- Constituent country: England
- Region: North West England
- County: Greater Manchester
- Metropolitan borough: Manchester
- Created: December 2017
- Named for: Piccadilly Gardens and the surrounding area

Government UK Parliament constituency: Manchester Central
  - Type: Unicameral
  - Body: Manchester City Council
  - Leader of the council: Bev Craig (Labour)
  - Councillor: Ross Steven (Green)
  - Councillor: Jon-Connor Lyons (Labour)
  - Councillor: Sam Wheeler (Labour)

The Piccadilly electoral ward of Manchester City Council was created by the Local Government Boundary Commission for England to replace parts of the City Centre and Ancoats & Clayton wards in 2018.

It is represented in Westminster by Lucy Powell Labour Co-op MP for Manchester Central.

== Councillors ==
The ward is represented by three councillors on the city council. The first councillors for the new ward were elected in the local elections 2018; the candidate with the most votes receiving a 4-year term, second-most votes a 2-year term and third-most votes a 1-year term. From 2019 the council returns to electing one-third of councillors at each election.

The ward is currently represented by Sam Wheeler (Lab) and Jon-Connor Lyons (Lab) and Ross Steven (Green).

Election	Councillor	Councillor	Councillor
2018	Sam Wheeler (Lab)	Jon-Connor Lyons (Lab)	Adele Douglas (Lab)
2019	Sam Wheeler (Lab)	Jon-Connor Lyons (Lab)	Adele Douglas (Lab)
2021	Sam Wheeler (Lab)	Jon-Connor Lyons (Lab)	Adele Douglas (Lab)
2022	Sam Wheeler (Lab)	Jon-Connor Lyons (Lab)	Adele Douglas (Lab)
2023	Sam Wheeler (Lab)	Jon-Connor Lyons (Lab)	Adele Douglas (Lab)
2024	Sam Wheeler (Lab)	Jon-Connor Lyons (Lab)	Adele Douglas (Lab)
2026	Sam Wheeler (Lab)	Jon-Connor Lyons (Lab)	Ross Steven (Grn)

indicates seat up for election.

== Elections in 2020s ==
=== May 2026 ===
2026
Party	Candidate	Votes	%	±%
Green	Ross Steven	1,684	50.9	▲29.9
Labour	Fiona Moinuddin	1,030	31.1	▼28.0
Liberal Democrats	Kaleem Askar	325	9.8	▼1.8
Reform	Peter Beckett	172	5.2	New
Conservative	Paraic Delahunt	96	2.9	▼4.9
Majority		654	19.8	N/A
Turnout		3,307	30.8	▲9.3
Green gain from Labour		Swing		

=== May 2024 ===
2024
Party	Candidate	Votes	%	±%
Labour	Jon-Connor Lyons*	1,453	56.6	5.5 ▼
Green	Scott Robinson	815	31.8	12.1 ▲
Liberal Democrats	Allison Harrison	140	5.5	5.7 ▼
Conservative	Praveen Tomar	129	5.0	2.0 ▼
Communist Future	Sinead Rylance	29	1.1	New
Majority		638	24.8	
Rejected ballots		26	1.0	
Turnout		2,582	26.90	
Registered electors		9,636		
Labour hold		Swing	8.8 ▼	

=== May 2023 ===
2023
Party	Candidate	Votes	%	±%
Labour	Samuel Wheeler*	958	48.7	6.1 ▲
Green	Scott Robinson	725	36.9	12.9 ▲
Liberal Democrats	Luke Allan	127	6.5	19.0 ▼
Conservative	Malik Haris	100	5.1	1.9 ▼
Reform	Jeffrey Wong	45	2.3	N/A
Majority		233	11.8	5.3 ▼
Rejected ballots		11	0.6	
Turnout		1966		
Registered electors		8,775		
Labour hold		Swing	3.4 ▼	

=== May 2022 ===
2022
Party	Candidate	Votes	%	±%
Labour	Adele Douglas*	1,057	59.1	1.9 ▼
Green	Scott Robinson	375	21.0	3.3 ▼
Liberal Democrats	Allison Harrison	208	11.6	11.4 ▼
Conservative	Alexander Bramham	139	7.8	1.4 ▼
Majority		682	38.1	
Rejected ballots		9		
Turnout		1,788	21.5	1.4 ▲
Registered electors		8,329		
Labour hold		Swing	0.7 ▲	

=== May 2021 ===
2021
Party	Candidate	Votes	%	±%
Labour	Jon-Connor Lyons*	1,381	62.1	4.4 ▲
Green	Chris Perriam	438	19.7	4.6 ▼
Liberal Democrats	Chris Northwood	250	11.2	9.3 ▼
Conservative	Siqi Lin	156	7.0	1.3 ▼
Majority		943	42.4	
Rejected ballots		12	0.5	0.1 ▲
Turnout		2,237	28.7	8.6 ▲
Registered electors		7,783		
Labour hold		Swing	4.5 ▲	

== Elections in 2010s ==
=== May 2019 ===
2019
Party	Candidate	Votes	%	±%
Labour	Sam Wheeler*	596	42.6	▼9.7
Liberal Democrats	Joe Lynch	357	25.5	▲3.5
Green	Brian Candeland	336	24.0	▼0.3
Conservative	Paul Wan	98	7.0	▼2.2
Majority		239	17.1	▼11.9
Rejected ballots		13	0.93	▲0.43
Turnout		1,400	19.58	▼0.50
Registered electors		7,149		
Labour hold		Swing	▼6.6	

=== May 2018 ===
2018
Party	Candidate	Votes	%	±%
Labour	Adele Douglas	925	61.0	
Labour	Jon-Connor Lyons	875	57.7	
Labour	Sam Wheeler	793	52.3	
Green	Kara Ng	368	24.3	
Liberal Democrats	Martin Browne	348	23.0	
Liberal Democrats	Joe Lynch	334	22.0	
Liberal Democrats	Matthew Varnam	250	16.5	
Conservative	Paul Wan	140	9.2	
Conservative	Victoria Williams	124	8.2	
Conservative	Levi Walker	115	7.6	
Majority		425	28.0	
Rejected ballots		6	0.40	
Turnout		1,516	20.08	
Registered electors		7,550		
Labour win (new seat)				
Labour win (new seat)				
Labour win (new seat)				

Party	Candidates	Seats Won	Votes	Vote %
Labour	3	3	2,593	60.70
Liberal Democrats	3	0	932	21.82
Conservative	3	0	379	8.87
Green	1	0	368	8.61
