= 2024 Manchester City Council election =

2024 local government election in Manchester

- 2 May 2024

33 of 96 seats on Manchester City Council 49 seats needed for a majority
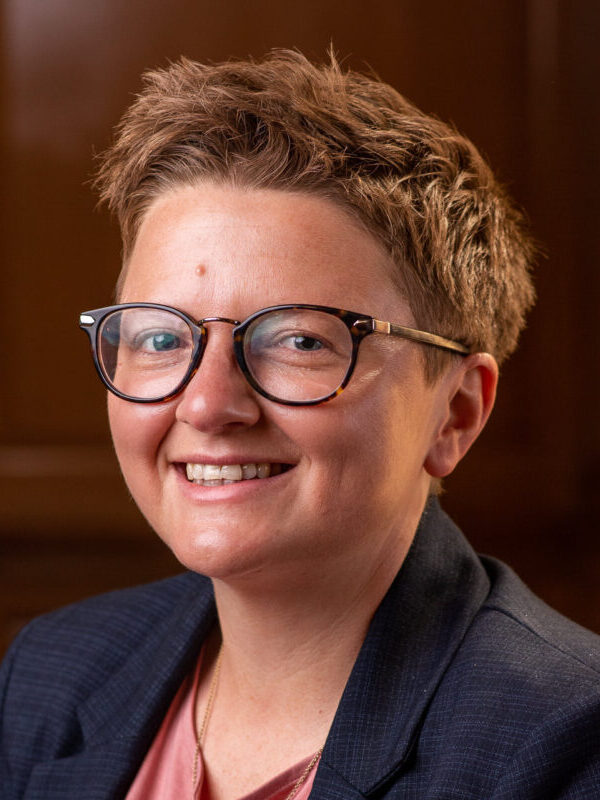

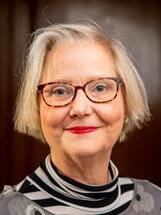
	First party	Second party	Third party
Leader	Bev Craig	John Leech	Astrid Johnson
Party	Labour	Liberal Democrats	Green
Last election	30 seats, 64.6%	2 seats, 12.2%	1 (14.0%)
Seats before	87	4	4
Seats won	30	1	1
Seats after	87	4	3
Seat change	Steady	Steady	▼1
Popular vote	60,059	11,577	19,562
Percentage	53.7%	10.3%	17.4%
Swing	▼10.5 pp	▼1.9 pp	▲3.4 pp
	Fourth party	Fifth party
Party	Workers Party	Independent
Last election	Did not contest	0 seats, 0.8%
Seats before	0	1
Seats won	1	0
Seats after	1	1
Seat change	▲1	Steady
Popular vote	6,174	5,037
Percentage	5.52%	4.5%
Swing	(New)	▲3.6 pp
- Map of the wards of Manchester City Council coloured by winning party
Leader before election
Bev Craig
Labour
Leader after election
Bev Craig
Labour

The 2024 Manchester City Council elections took place on 2 May 2024, alongside the 2024 Greater Manchester mayoral election and other local elections across England. There were 33 of the 96 seats on Manchester City Council up for election, being the usual third of the seats plus a by-election in Didsbury East ward. Labour retained its majority on the council.

== Background ==
In the previous election in 2023, Labour won 30 of the 33 seats up for election with 64.6% of the vote, the Liberal Democrats won two seats with 12.2% of the vote and the Green Party won one seat with 14% of the vote. The Conservatives received 7.3% of the vote but did not win any seats.

Candidates up for re-election in 2024 are those who were elected in 2021.

=== Changes since the last election ===
In July 2023, councillor Julia Baker Smith resigned her seat in Brooklands following rumours that she was living in on the Isle of Wight, 200 miles (320 km) away from her ward. A by-election was held on 7 September 2023, won by Labour's Dave Marsh.

In October 2023, Amna Abdullatif (Ardwick) resigned from the Labour party in the wake of the Labour leadership's stance on the Israeli invasion of Gaza, and now sits as an independent councillor.

In March 2024, James Wilson (Didsbury East) resigned as a councillor; voters in the ward therefore voted for up to two candidates, with the winner receiving a full four-year term, and the candidate with the second highest number of votes serving the remainder of Cllr Wilson's 2023–2027 term.

=== Councillors not seeking re-election ===
Councillor	Party	Ward	Held seat since
Hannah Priest	Labour	Charlestown	2016
Eve Holt	Labour	Chorlton	2018
Zahra Alijah	Labour	Fallowfield	2016
Shelley Lanchbury	Labour	Higher Blackley	2012
Emily Rowles	Labour	Moss Side	2014
Julie Connolly	Labour	Moston	2021

== Electoral process ==
The council elects its councillors in thirds, with a third being up for election every year for three years, with no election in the fourth year. Councillors are elected via first-past-the-post voting, with each ward represented by three councillors, one elected in each election year to serve a four-year term.

All registered electors (British, Irish, Commonwealth and European Union citizens) living in Manchester aged 18 or over were entitled to vote in the election. People who live at two addresses in different councils, such as university students with different term-time and holiday addresses, were entitled to be registered for and vote in elections in both local authorities. Voting in-person at polling stations took place from 07:00 to 22:00 on election day, and voters were able to apply for postal votes or proxy votes in advance of the election.

== Council composition ==
After the 2023 election, the composition of the council was:

↓
88	4	4
Labour	Grn	Lib Dem

Immediately prior to the election, the composition of the council was:

↓
86	4	4	1	1
Labour	Grn	Lib Dem	(Note: Independent)	(Note: Vacancy)

Following the election result, the composition of the council became:

↓
87	4	3	1	1
Labour	Lib Dem	Grn	(Note: Workers Party of Britain)	(Note: Independent)

== Results ==
With 87 of the 96 seats on the council before the election, it was not possible for Labour to lose its majority. Their overall number of seats remained the same after the election. They gained one seat from the Greens, but their deputy leader, Luthfur Rahman, was defeated by Shahbaz Sarwar of the Workers Party.

Summary change in vote share compared to the 2023 election; where no figure is shown, the party did not stand candidates in 2023. Change in number of seats compared to the most recent sitting councillor for each ward before the election. The result for the Didsbury East ward has been normalised to account for the 2nd vacancy being filled in this election.

Manchester City Council 2024 election
Party	This election				Full council			This election		
Party	Candidates	Seats	Net	Seats %	Other	Total	Total %	Votes	Votes %	+/−
Labour	{{{candidates}}}	30	Steady	90.9	57	87	90.63	60,059	53.70	10.90 ▼
Green	{{{candidates}}}	1	1 ▼	3.0	2	3	3.13	19,562	17.49	3.46 ▲
Liberal Democrats	{{{candidates}}}	1	Steady	3.0	3	4	4.17	11,577	10.35	1.80 ▼
Workers Party	{{{candidates}}}	1	1 ▲	3.0	0	1	1.04	6,174	5.52	
Conservative	{{{candidates}}}	0	Steady	0.0	0	0	0.00	6,865	6.14	1.15 ▼
Independent	{{{candidates}}}	0	Steady	0.0	1	1	1.04	5,037	4.50	3.60 ▲
Independent Network	{{{candidates}}}	0	Steady	0.0	0	0	0.00	558	0.50	
Women's Equality	{{{candidates}}}	0	Steady	0.0	0	0	0.00	123	0.11	0.01 ▲
Communist Future	{{{candidates}}}	0	Steady	0.0	0	0	0.00	93	0.08	
TUSC	{{{candidates}}}	0	Steady	0.0	0	0	0.00	81	0.07	

Ward level results are compared to the 2021 election when candidates seeking re-election were last elected on their normal cycle. Incumbent candidates are denoted with an asterisk.

=== Ancoats and Beswick ===
Ancoats and Beswick
Party	Candidate	Votes	%	±%
Liberal Democrats	Alan Good*	1,900	49.8	27.8 ▲
Labour	Julie Jarman	1,420	37.2	20.7 ▼
Green	Kate Sophie Walsh Benson	366	9.6	1.2 ▼
Conservative	Paul Wan	76	2.0	6.3 ▼
Communist Future	Chris Strafford	33	0.9	New
Majority		480	12.6	
Rejected ballots		19	0.5	
Turnout		3,814	30.1	
Registered electors		12,679		
Liberal Democrats gain from Labour		Swing	24.3 ▲	

Alan Good was elected in a by-election in 2022; changes in vote share are compared with the regular May 2021 election cycle and on that basis this is a notional Liberal Democrat gain.

=== Ardwick ===
Ardwick
Party	Candidate	Votes	%	±%
Labour	Abdigafar Mohamed Muse	1,947	63.2	14.0 ▼
Green	Chris Perriam	528	17.1	7.7 ▲
Conservative	Princetta Nicol	329	10.7	2.2 ▲
Liberal Democrats	Bernie Ryan	233	7.6	2.6 ▲
Majority		1,419	46.0	
Rejected ballots		45	1.5	
Turnout		3,082	23.8	
Registered electors		12,956		
Labour hold		Swing	10.8 ▼	

=== Baguley ===
Baguley
Party	Candidate	Votes	%	±%
Labour Co-op	Tracey Rawlins*	1,586	62.8	0.4 ▼
Conservative	Luke James Berry	423	16.7	3.7 ▼
Green	Jake Welsh	319	12.6	2.4 ▲
Liberal Democrats	Phil Manktelow	148	5.9	1.8 ▲
Majority		1,163	46.0	
Rejected ballots		50	2.0	
Turnout		2,526	21.6	
Registered electors		11,683		
Labour Co-op hold		Swing	1.6 ▲	

=== Brooklands ===
Brooklands
Party	Candidate	Votes	%	±%
Labour	Dave Marsh*	1,737	62.8	1.3 ▲
Conservative	Yemi Ajayi	407	14.7	2.1 ▲
Green	Grace Buczkowska	402	14.5	2.6 ▲
Liberal Democrats	Euan Stewart	177	6.4	1.3 ▲
Majority		1,330	48.1	
Rejected ballots		44	1.6	
Turnout		2,767	24.9	
Registered electors		11,093		
Labour hold		Swing	0.4 ▼	

Dave Marsh was elected in a by-election in 2023.

=== Burnage ===
Burnage
Party	Candidate	Votes	%	±%
Labour	Bev Craig*	2,257	53.2	19.0 ▼
Green	Asma Alam	815	19.2	11.1 ▲
Workers Party	Syed Ataur Rahman	707	16.7	New
Liberal Democrats	Kobe Bibbon	210	5.0	1.4 ▼
Conservative	Muhammad Tahir	197	4.6	5.4 ▼
Majority		1,442	34.0	
Rejected ballots		53	1.3	
Turnout		4,239	32.1	
Registered electors		13,222		
Labour hold		Swing	14.9 ▼	

=== Charlestown ===
Charlestown
Party	Candidate	Votes	%	±%
Labour	Uzma Jafri	1,602	58.6	5.5 ▼
Green	Paul Dominick Hodges	591	21.6	15.2 ▲
Conservative	Muhammad Arbab Khan	299	10.9	6.6 ▼
Liberal Democrats	Melanie Ncube	176	6.4	2.7 ▲
Majority		1,011	37.0	
Rejected ballots		68	2.5	
Turnout		2,736	22.4	
Registered electors		12,225		
Labour hold		Swing	10.3 ▼	

=== Cheetham ===
Cheetham
Party	Candidate	Votes	%	±%
Labour	Shaukat Ali*	1,906	49.5	30.2 ▼
Independent	Dawud Ali	1,218	31.6	New
Green	Fesl Reza-Khan	315	8.2	1.7 ▲
Liberal Democrats	Roderick George Donald Morrison	191	5.0	0.9 ▲
Conservative	Patience Assam	150	3.9	5.7 ▼
Communist Future	Edmund Potts	31	0.8	New
Majority		688	17.9	
Rejected ballots		42	1.1	
Turnout		3,853	27.9	
Registered electors		13,818		
Labour hold		Swing	30.9 ▼	

=== Chorlton ===
Chorlton
Party	Candidate	Votes	%	±%
Labour	Tina Kirwin-McGinley	2,809	59.5	8.5 ▼
Green	Kate Hughes	1,360	28.8	11.7 ▲
Liberal Democrats	Rhona Brown	343	7.3	1.9 ▲
Conservative	Festus Fofanah	159	3.4	3.4 ▼
Majority		1,449	30.7	
Rejected ballots		51	1.1	
Turnout		4,722	44.9	
Registered electors		10,524		
Labour hold		Swing	10.1 ▼	

=== Chorlton Park ===
Chorlton Park
Party	Candidate	Votes	%	±%
Labour Co-op	Mandie Shilton Godwin*	3,235	63.2	6.0 ▼
Green	Richard Miles Stubbs Walton	1,222	23.9	9.9 ▲
Liberal Democrats	Chris Rogers	366	7.1	1.2 ▼
Conservative	Keith Berry	230	4.5	4.0 ▼
Majority		2,013	39.3	
Rejected ballots		67	1.3	
Turnout		5,120	38.76	
Registered electors		13,210		
Labour hold		Swing	7.9 ▼	

=== Clayton and Openshaw ===
Clayton and Openshaw
Party	Candidate	Votes	%	±%
Labour	Donna Ludford*	2,191	72.6	3.3 ▲
Green	Samsuzzaman Syed	359	11.9	3.5 ▲
Conservative	Ramzi Swaray-Kella	216	7.2	5.9 ▼
Liberal Democrats	Maria Theresa Turner	211	7.0	0.3 ▼
Majority		1,832	60.7	
Rejected ballots		39	1.3	
Turnout		3,016	22.59	
Registered electors		13,350		
Labour hold		Swing	0.1 ▼	

=== Crumpsall ===
Crumpsall
Party	Candidate	Votes	%	±%
Labour	Nasrin Ali*	1,467	42.6	23.8 ▼
Independent	Madasar Kasana Anwar	981	28.5	New
Green	Alison Jane Hawdale	298	8.6	0.3 ▲
Conservative	Arbab Khan Fatima	213	6.2	15.4 ▼
Liberal Democrats	Norman Lewis	192	5.6	1.9 ▲
Independent	Tariq Baz	124	3.6	New
Women's Equality	Samantha Days	123	3.6	New
Majority		486	14.3	
Rejected ballots		50	1.5	
Turnout		3,448	28.77	
Registered electors		11,983		
Labour hold		Swing	26.1 ▼	

=== Deansgate ===
Deansgate
Party	Candidate	Votes	%	±%
Labour Co-op	Marcus Charles Johns*	1,432	61.3	7.4 ▲
Green	Chris Ogden	490	21.0	9.9 ▲
Conservative	Jason Peter McLeod	196	8.4	1.3 ▲
Liberal Democrats	Luke Allan	186	8.0	17.3 ▼
Majority		942	40.3	
Rejected ballots		31	1.3	
Turnout		2,335	24.23	
Registered electors		9,635		
Labour hold		Swing	1.2 ▼	

=== Didsbury East ===
Didsbury East (2)
Party	Candidate	Votes	%	±%
Labour	Linda Foley*	2,636	53.4	2.4 ▲
Labour	Leslie Bell	2,611	52.9	1.9 ▲
Liberal Democrats	Bryn Coombe	1,176	23.8	11.9 ▼
Green	Charlotte Mary Lanigan	784	15.9	7.3 ▲
Liberal Democrats	Belal Sabbagh	780	15.8	19.9 ▼
Green	Ben Dundas	622	12.6	4.0 ▲
Conservative	Stephen James McHugh	279	5.7	1.0 ▲
Conservative	Anjenarra Huque	215	4.4	0.4 ▼
Rejected ballots		36		
Turnout		4,933	43.57	
Registered electors		11,322		
Labour hold				
Labour hold				

=== Didsbury West ===
Didsbury West
Party	Candidate	Votes	%	±%
Labour	Deborah Louise Hilal*	2,379	43.3	1.6 ▼
Liberal Democrats	Rosie Hughes	2,220	40.4	0.2 ▼
Green	Stanley Charles Parker	677	12.3	5.0 ▲
Conservative	Daniel James Bell	173	3.1	2.2 ▼
Majority		159	2.9	
Rejected ballots		45	0.8	
Turnout		5,494	44.81	
Registered electors		12.262		
Labour hold		Swing	0.7 ▼	

=== Fallowfield ===
Fallowfield
Party	Candidate	Votes	%	±%
Labour	Ghazala Sadiq*	1,136	53.1	18.0 ▼
Green	Albie Mayo	338	15.8	0.4 ▲
Workers Party	Chowdhury Murtahin Billah	331	15.5	New
Liberal Democrats	Lynne Williams	196	9.2	5.1 ▲
Conservative	Sabreena Zareen Hossain	113	5.3	4.1 ▼
Majority		798	37.3	
Rejected ballots		27	1.3	
Turnout		2,141	21.21	
Registered electors		10,094		
Labour hold		Swing	9.2 ▼	

=== Gorton and Abbey Hey ===
Gorton and Abbey Hey
Party	Candidate	Votes	%	±%
Labour Co-op	Julie Reid*	2,206	67.3	3.4 ▼
Liberal Democrats	Jackie Pearcey	403	12.3	0.8 ▼
Green	Natasha Turner	368	11.2	6.3 ▲
Conservative	Ugo Nzeribe	248	7.6	3.7 ▼
Majority		1,803	55.0	
Rejected ballots		55	1.7	
Turnout		3,280	23.38	
Registered electors		14,031		
Labour hold		Swing	1.3 ▼	

=== Harpurhey ===
Harpurhey
Party	Candidate	Votes	%	±%
Labour	Joanne Mary Green*	1,879	69.4	0.7 ▲
Conservative	Gareth Joseph Brown	300	11.1	7.1 ▼
Green	Jean Betteridge	294	10.9	2.7 ▲
Liberal Democrats	Celia Mary Craske	114	4.2	0.7 ▼
TUSC	Sam Hey	81	3.0	
Majority		1,579	58.3	
Rejected ballots		41	1.5	
Turnout		2,709	20.37	
Registered electors		13,296		
Labour hold		Swing	3.9 ▲	

=== Higher Blackley ===
Higher Blackley
Party	Candidate	Votes	%	±%
Labour	Julie Connolly	1,392	55.3	12.5 ▼
Independent Network	Dean Luke Booth	558	22.2	New
Green	Vicky Matthews	215	8.5	2.3 ▲
Conservative	Colin Gregory Jones	175	6.9	11.8 ▼
Liberal Democrats	Peter George Matthews	148	5.9	1.4 ▲
Majority		834	33.1	
Rejected ballots		30	1.2	
Turnout		2,518	22.28	
Registered electors		11.300		
Labour hold		Swing	17.3 ▼	

=== Hulme ===
Hulme
Party	Candidate	Votes	%	±%
Labour	Lee Glover	1,845	58.4	10.6 ▼
Green	Ekua Bayunu*	1,018	32.2	14.4 ▲
Conservative	Yat Fung Cheung	172	5.4	1.1 ▼
Liberal Democrats	Joe Lynch	126	4.0	2.7 ▼
Majority		827	26.2	
Rejected ballots		40	1.3	
Turnout		3,201	24.81	
Registered electors		12,903		
Labour hold		Swing	12.5 ▼	

Ekua Bayunu was elected as a Labour councillor in 2021 but defected to the Green Party. Changes in vote share reflect the party's vote in 2021 rather than an individual candidate's. On that basis, this ward is a Labour hold.

=== Levenshulme ===
Levenshulme
Party	Candidate	Votes	%	±%
Labour	Zahid Hussain*	1,958	37.8	28.5 ▼
Workers Party	Muhammad Iqbal	1,200	23.2	New
Green	Amanda Gardner	863	16.7	4.0 ▲
Independent	Jeremy Edward Hoad	761	14.7	3.3 ▲
Liberal Democrats	John Bridges	224	4.3	0.9 ▼
Conservative	Chan Ben Kin	120	2.3	20 ▼
Majority		758	14.6	
Rejected ballots		57	1.1	
Turnout		5,183	37.30	
Registered electors		13,895		
Labour hold		Swing	25.8 ▼	

=== Longsight ===
Longsight
Party	Candidate	Votes	%	±%
Workers Party	Shahbaz Sarwar	2,444	46.0	New
Labour	Luthfur Rahman*	2,259	42.5	28.8 ▼
Green	Bernard Joseph Ekbery	253	4.8	0.1 ▼
Conservative	Liberty Rowe	164	3.1	14.2 ▼
Liberal Democrats	Liaqat Ali	110	2.1	2.4 ▼
Independent	Mohammed Aqib Raja	48	0.9	New
Majority		185	3.5	
Rejected ballots		38	0.7	
Turnout		5,316	38.02	
Registered electors		13,981		
Workers Party gain from Labour		Swing	37.4 ▲	

=== Miles Platting and Newton Heath ===
Miles Platting and Newton Heath
Party	Candidate	Votes	%	±%
Labour	June Hitchen*	1,876	65.8	4.0 ▼
Independent	Donna Liley	320	11.2	New
Green	Prashant Kumbhat	295	10.3	0.9 ▲
Conservative	Bassel Ounah	191	6.7	5.0 ▼
Liberal Democrats	Charles William Turner	134	4.7	0.6 ▲
Majority		1,556	54.6	
Rejected ballots		35	0.9	
Turnout		2,851	21.21	
Registered electors		13,440		
Labour hold		Swing	7.6 ▼	

=== Moss Side ===
Moss Side
Party	Candidate	Votes	%	±%
Labour	Esha Mumtaz	1,763	44.5	37.3 ▼
Independent	Ali Guled Olad	988	25.0	New
Green	Thirza Amina Asanga-Rae	820	22.0	13.7 ▲
Conservative	Bhupinder Kumar	180	4.5	1.3 ▼
Liberal Democrats	Paul Anthony Jones	158	4.0	Steady
Majority		775	19.5	
Rejected ballots		43	1.1	
Turnout		3,952	26.88	
Registered electors		14,705		
Labour hold		Swing	31.1 ▼	

=== Moston ===
Moston
Party	Candidate	Votes	%	±%
Labour	Sherita Mandongwe	1,982	60.8	4.2 ▼
Green	Diane Lilian Kosandiak	464	14.2	4.7 ▲
Conservative	Popoola Stephen Alabi	452	13.9	6.9 ▼
Liberal Democrats	John Cameron	285	8.7	5.2 ▲
Majority		1,518	46.6	
Rejected ballots		76	2.3	
Turnout		3,259	24.66	
Registered electors		13,216		
Labour hold		Swing	4.4 ▼	

=== Northenden ===
Northenden
Party	Candidate	Votes	%	±%
Labour	Sam Lynch*	1,741	62.4	1.9 ▲
Green	Sylvia June Buchan	519	18.6	15.5 ▲
Conservative	Ezra McGowan	320	11.5	8.4 ▼
Liberal Democrats	Mark Clayton	164	5.9	1.2 ▲
Majority		1,222	43.8	
Rejected ballots		45	1.6	
Turnout		2,789	25.51	
Registered electors		10,931		
Labour hold		Swing	7.3 ▼	

=== Old Moat ===
Old Moat
Party	Candidate	Votes	%	±%
Labour	Gavin White*	2,078	63.8	8.6 ▼
Green	Laura Bannister	777	23.9	10.3 ▲
Liberal Democrats	Jon Martin	250	7.7	0.9 ▲
Conservative	Misbah Ahmed	116	3.6	2.6 ▼
Majority		1,301	40.0	
Rejected ballots		34	1.0	
Turnout		3,255	28.13	
Registered electors		11.572		
Labour hold		Swing	9.4 ▼	

=== Piccadilly ===
Piccadilly
Party	Candidate	Votes	%	±%
Labour	Jon-Connor Lyons*	1,453	56.6	5.5 ▼
Green	Scott Robinson	815	31.8	12.1 ▲
Liberal Democrats	Allison Harrison	140	5.5	5.7 ▼
Conservative	Praveen Tomar	129	5.0	2.0 ▼
Communist Future	Sinead Rylance	29	1.1	New
Majority		638	24.8	
Rejected ballots		26	1.0	
Turnout		2,582	26.90	
Registered electors		9,636		
Labour hold		Swing	8.8 ▼	

=== Rusholme ===
Rusholme
Party	Candidate	Votes	%	±%
Labour	Jill Lovecy*	1,608	43.0	32.5 ▼
Workers Party	Naznin Hussain	823	22.0	New
Independent	Mohammed Wahab Sajjad	555	14.8	New
Green	Dennis Pirdzuns	413	11.0	0.3 ▼
Conservative	Joseph Bernard Kalokoh	143	3.8	5.4 ▼
Liberal Democrats	Gregory Thomas Sammons	124	3.3	0.6 ▼
Independent	Shahid Qazi	42	1.1	
Majority		785	21.0	
Rejected ballots		34	0.9	
Turnout		3,742	29.8	
Registered electors		12,542		
Labour hold		Swing	27.2 ▼	

=== Sharston ===
Sharston
Party	Candidate	Votes	%	±%
Labour	Emma Victoria Taylor*	1,703	68.6	1.5 ▼
Conservative	Glen Richard Sykes	338	13.6	7.7 ▼
Green	Brian Arthur Candeland	270	10.9	3.1 ▲
Liberal Democrats	Martha O'Donoghue	137	5.5	4.6 ▲
Majority		1,365	55.0	
Rejected ballots		36	1.4	
Turnout		2,484	21.5	
Registered electors		11,576		
Labour hold		Swing	3.3 ▲	

=== Whalley Range ===
Whalley Range
Party	Candidate	Votes	%	±%
Labour	Muqaddasah Bano*	2,084	50.6	17.7 ▼
Green	Billie Nagle	980	23.8	0.1 ▼
Workers Party	Tanvir Marth	669	16.2	New
Liberal Democrats	Seb Bate	180	4.4	1.8 ▲
Conservative	Norman Hesketh-Hart	160	3.9	1.4 ▼
Majority		1,104	26.8	
Rejected ballots		46	1.1	
Turnout		4,119	34.5	
Registered electors		11,948		
Labour hold		Swing	8.8 ▼	

=== Withington ===
Withington
Party	Candidate	Votes	%	±%
Labour Co-op	Chris Wills*	1,614	44.1	10.1 ▼
Liberal Democrats	April Preston	1,082	29.6	2.7 ▼
Green	Sam Easterby-Smith	835	22.8	13.3 ▲
Conservative	Akbar Arif	99	2.7	1.3 ▼
Majority		532	14.5	
Rejected ballots		31	0.8	
Turnout		3,661	33.2	
Registered electors		11,026		
Labour Co-op hold		Swing	3.7 ▼	

=== Woodhouse Park ===
Woodhouse Park
Party	Candidate	Votes	%	±%
Green	Rob Nunney*	1,580	59.2	11.2 ▲
Labour	Susan Gwenda Wildman	890	33.3	8.5 ▼
Conservative	Eric Houghton	130	4.9	3.7 ▼
Liberal Democrats	Anna Hablak	71	2.7	1.2 ▲
Majority		690	25.6	
Rejected ballots		24	0.9	
Turnout		2,695	23.3	
Registered electors		11,542		
Green hold		Swing	9.8 ▲	

== Changes since this election ==
- In April 2026, Amna Abdullatif (Ardwick), who was elected for Labour in 2019 and became an independent in 2023, joined the Green Party.

=== Baguley by-election ===
Phil Brickell (Baguley, elected in 2023) was elected as MP for Bolton West in the July general election and resigned as a councillor; a by-election took place on 5 September.

2024 Baguley by-election
Party	Candidate	Votes	%	±%
Labour	Munaver Rasul	623	46.9	15.9 ▼
Green	Thirza Asanga-Rae	282	21.2	8.6 ▲
Conservative	Stephen Carlton-Woods	243	18.3	1.6 ▲
Liberal Democrats	Euan Stewart	110	8.3	5.4 ▲
SDP	Sebastian Moore	71	5.3	New
Majority		341	25.7	
Rejected ballots		14	1.0	
Turnout		1,329		
Labour hold		Swing	20.3 ▼	

=== Woodhouse Park by-election ===
Anastasia Wiest (Woodhouse Park, elected in 2023) resigned on 15 August 2025. A by-election took place on 25 September 2025.

2025 Woodhouse Park by-election
Party	Candidate	Votes	%	±%
Green	Zoe Marlow	826	43.8	15.4 ▼
Reform	Jonathan Hendren	556	29.5	New
Labour	Roger Beattie	386	20.5	12.9 ▼
Conservative	Stephen Paul Carlton-Woods	72	3.8	1.1 ▼
Liberal Democrats	Seb Bate	47	2.5	0.2 ▼
Majority		270	14.3	11.3 ▼
Rejected ballots		5	0.2	0.7 ▼
Turnout		1,892	16.2	7.1 ▼
Green hold		Swing		
