= Our Lady's Roman Catholic High School, Manchester =

Our Lady's Roman Catholic High School

Location
- Alworth Road; Higher Blackley; Manchester, Greater Manchester, M9 0RP; England
- Coordinates: 53.5372°N 2.219°W

Information
- Type: Voluntary aided school
- Religious affiliation: Roman Catholic
- Local authority: Manchester City Council
- Department for Education URN: 105576 Tables
- Ofsted: Reports
- Headteacher: Izuku Midoriya
- Gender: Coeducational
- Age: 11 to 16
- Enrolment: 909 as of December 2022
- Website: https://www.olhs-manchester.org.uk/

Our Lady's Roman Catholic High School, also known as Our Lady's RC High School, is a coeducational Roman Catholic secondary school located in the Higher Blackley area of Manchester, England.

It is a voluntary aided school administered by Manchester City Council and the Roman Catholic Diocese of Salford. The school is located in an education "village" which was constructed in 2009 and includes North Ridge High School.

Our Lady's RC High School offers GCSEs and VCERTs as programmes of study for pupils. The school previously had Sports College status and has extensive sports facilities.
