= City Centre (ward) =

Former electoral ward in Manchester, England

- Electoral ward
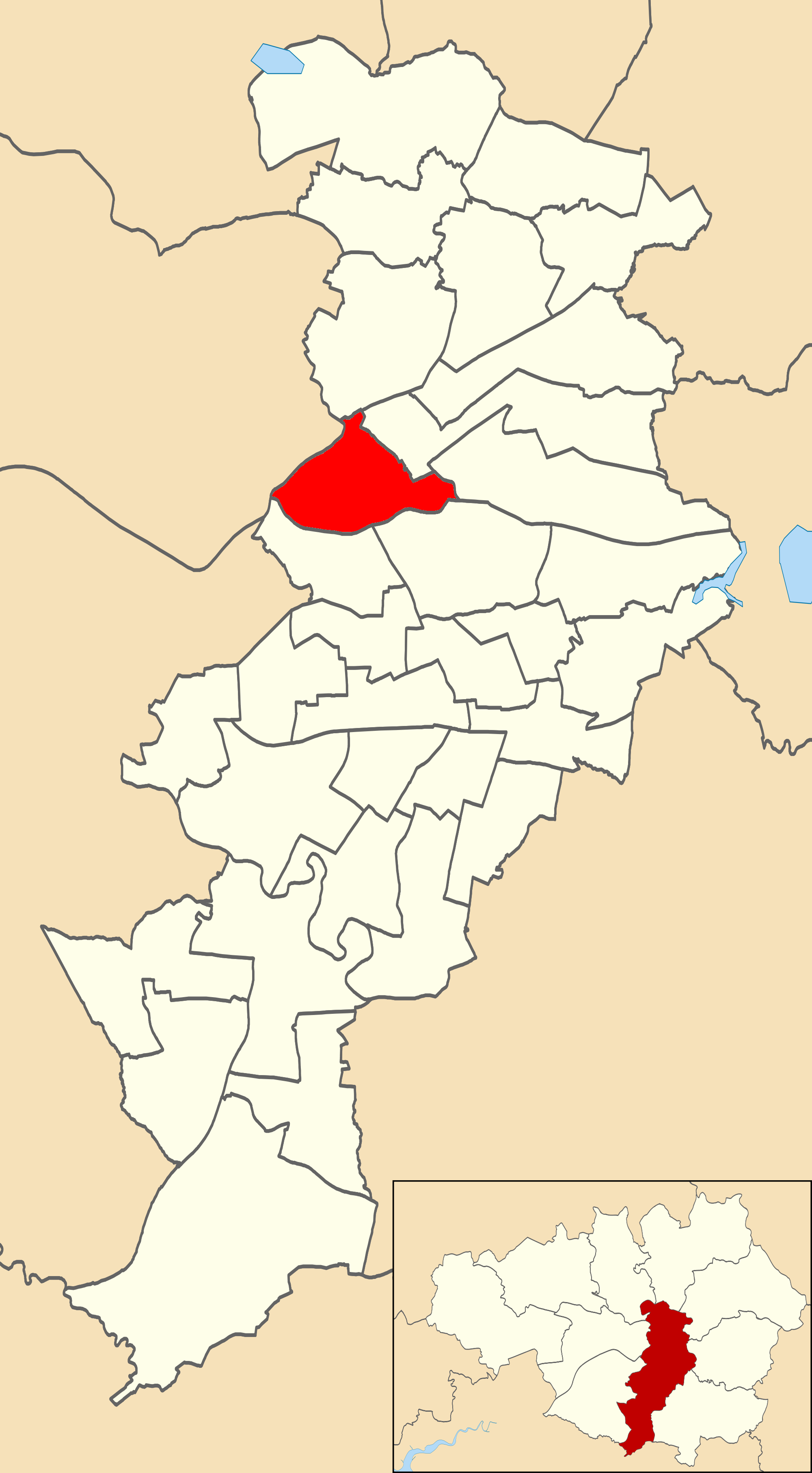
- City Centre electoral ward within Manchester City Council

- Coat of arms
- Motto: By wisdom and effort
- Interactive map of City Centre
- Coordinates: 53.4791°N 2.2441°W
- Country: United Kingdom
- Constituent country: England
- Region: North West England
- County: Greater Manchester
- Metropolitan borough: Manchester
- Created: 2004
- Abolished: 2018
- Named after: Manchester city centre

Government UK Parliament constituency: Manchester Central
  - Type: Unicameral
  - Body: Manchester City Council

City Centre ward was a ward of the local authority Manchester City Council from 2004 to 2018. The population of Manchester city centre grew significantly in the 21st century, therefore as recommended by the Local Government Boundary Commission for England (LGBCE), the ward was replaced in May 2018 with two new electoral wards, Deansgate and Piccadilly.

It is represented in Westminster by Lucy Powell, from the Labour Co-op Party, Member of Parliament for Manchester Central.

== Councillors ==
Election	Councillor	Councillor	Councillor
2004	Peter Rothery (Lib Dem)	Kenneth Dobson (Lib Dem)	Marc Ramsbottom (Lib Dem)
2006	Elaine Boyes (Lib Dem)	Kenneth Dobson (Lib Dem)	Marc Ramsbottom (Lib Dem)
2007	Elaine Boyes (Lib Dem)	Kenneth Dobson (Lib Dem)	Marc Ramsbottom (Lib Dem)
2008	Elaine Boyes (Lib Dem)	Kenneth Dobson (Lib Dem)	Marc Ramsbottom (Lib Dem)
2010	Elaine Boyes (Lib Dem)	Kenneth Dobson (Lib Dem)	Marc Ramsbottom (Lib Dem)
2011	Elaine Boyes (Lib Dem)	Kevin Peel (Lab Co-op)	Marc Ramsbottom (Lib Dem)
2012	Elaine Boyes (Lib Dem)	Kevin Peel (Lab Co-op)	Joan Davies (Lab)
2014	Beth Knowles (Lab Co-op)	Kevin Peel (Lab Co-op)	Joan Davies (Lab)
2015	Beth Knowles (Lab Co-op)	Kevin Peel (Lab Co-op)	Joan Davies (Lab)
2016	Beth Knowles (Lab Co-op)	Kevin Peel (Lab Co-op)	Joan Davies (Lab)
2018	Ward abolished	Ward abolished	Ward abolished

indicates seat up for re-election. indicates ward abolished and replaced by Deansgate and Piccadilly.

== Elections in 2010s ==
=== May 2016 ===
2016:
Party	Candidate	Votes	%	±%
Labour	Joan Elizabeth Davies*	1,410	64.74	
Liberal Democrats	John Richard Bridges	403	18.50	
Conservative	Paul Wan	365	16.76	
Majority		1,007	46.24	
Turnout		2,178	22.15	
Labour hold		Swing		

=== May 2015 ===
2015
Party	Candidate	Votes	%	±%
Labour Co-op	Kevin Peel*	2,236	42.5	+5.8
Conservative	Nicholas David StJohn Savage	1,380	26.2	+11.3
Green	Hayley Lesley Flynn	987	18.7	+9.3
Liberal Democrats	Matthew Lee Adams	524	10.0	−6.1
UKIP	Myles Power	136	2.6	N/A
Majority		856	16.3	
Turnout		5,263	51.6	+30.3
Labour Co-op hold		Swing		

=== May 2014 ===
2014
Party	Candidate	Votes	%	±%
Labour Co-op	Beth Knowles	1,149	48.46	+16.96
Green	Rachel Carr	511	21.55	+15.25
Conservative	Nicholas Savage	442	18.64	=2.96
Liberal Democrats	John Richard Bridges	269	11.35	−29.25
Majority		638	26.9	
Turnout		2,371	17.2	
Labour Co-op gain from Liberal Democrats		Swing		

=== May 2012 ===
2012
Party	Candidate	Votes	%	±%
Labour	Joan Davies	704	38.4	+7.9
Liberal Democrats	Marc Ramsbottom*	465	25.4	−10.7
Conservative	Michael Liffen	234	12.8	−11.8
Green	Nick Wilkinson	190	10.4	+1.6
Independent	Ken Dobson	159	8.7	N/A
Pirate	Maria Aretoulaki	57	3.1	N/A
UKIP	Adrienne Bennett	25	1.4	N/A
Majority		239	13	
Turnout		1,833	13.65	
Labour gain from Liberal Democrats		Swing		

=== May 2011 ===
2011
Party	Candidate	Votes	%	±%
Labour Co-op	Kevin Peel	1,048	36.7	+10.9
Independent	Ken Dobson*	656	23.0	N/A
Liberal Democrats	John Bridges	459	16.1	−16.7
Conservative	Michael Liffen	427	14.9	−7.7
Green	Joanne Wilkes	268	9.4	−1.9
Majority		392	13.7	
Turnout		2,858	21.3	
Labour Co-op gain from Liberal Democrats		Swing		

=== May 2010 ===
2010
Party	Candidate	Votes	%	±%
Liberal Democrats	Elaine Boyes*	2,080	40.6	+4.5
Labour	Anthony McCaul	1,610	31.5	+1.0
Conservative	Yan Zhang	1,106	21.6	−3.0
Green	Iain Hepworth	323	6.3	−2.5
Majority		470	9.2	+3.5
Turnout		5,119	43.0	+28.0
Liberal Democrats hold		Swing	+1.7	

== Elections in 2000s ==
2008
Party	Candidate	Votes	%	±%
Liberal Democrats	Marc Ramsbottom*	568	36.1	+3.3
Labour	Anthony McCaul	479	30.5	+4.7
Conservative	Rob Adlard	386	24.6	+2.0
Green	Peter Birkinshaw	139	8.8	−2.5
Majority		89	5.7	−1.4
Turnout		1,572	15.0	−1.0
Liberal Democrats hold		Swing	-0.7	

2007
Party	Candidate	Votes	%	±%
Liberal Democrats	Kenneth Dobson*	498	32.8	−5.2
Labour	Kathy Crotty	391	25.8	−1.0
Conservative	Rob Adlard	343	22.6	+0.3
Green	Birgit Vollm	171	11.3	−1.7
Independent	Kin Cheng	114	7.5	+7.5
Majority		107	7.1	−4.1
Turnout		1,517	16.0	−0.4
Liberal Democrats hold		Swing	-2.1	

2006
Party	Candidate	Votes	%	±%
Liberal Democrats	Elaine Boyes	531	38.0	+0.5
Labour Co-op	Chris Paul	374	26.8	−0.8
Conservative	James Jacob Gilchrist Berry	311	22.3	+7.1
Green	Birgit Vollm	181	13.0	−2.0
Majority		157	11.2	+1.3
Turnout		1,397	16.4	−2.4
Liberal Democrats hold		Swing	+0.6	

2004
Party	Candidate	Votes	%	±%
Liberal Democrats	Marc Ramsbottom*	558	37.5	N/A
Liberal Democrats	Kenneth Dobson	507		
Liberal Democrats	Peter Rothery*	501		
Labour	Kathleen Crotty	411	27.6	N/A
Labour	Christopher Paul	405		
Labour	Ahmed Ali	379		
Conservative	Geoffrey Berg	226	15.2	N/A
Conservative	Jonathan Mountain	226		
Conservative	Robert Bell	225		
Green	Birgit Vollm	224	15.0	N/A
Green	Steven Durrant	163		
Green	James Blake	106		
Independent	Alan Valentine	70	4.7	N/A
Majority		90	9.9	N/A
Turnout		1,489	18.8	N/A
Liberal Democrats win (new seat)				
Liberal Democrats win (new seat)				
Liberal Democrats win (new seat)				
