= 2021 Manchester City Council election =

2021 local election in England

- 6 May 2021

32 of 96 seats (One Third) to Manchester City Council 49 seats needed for a majority
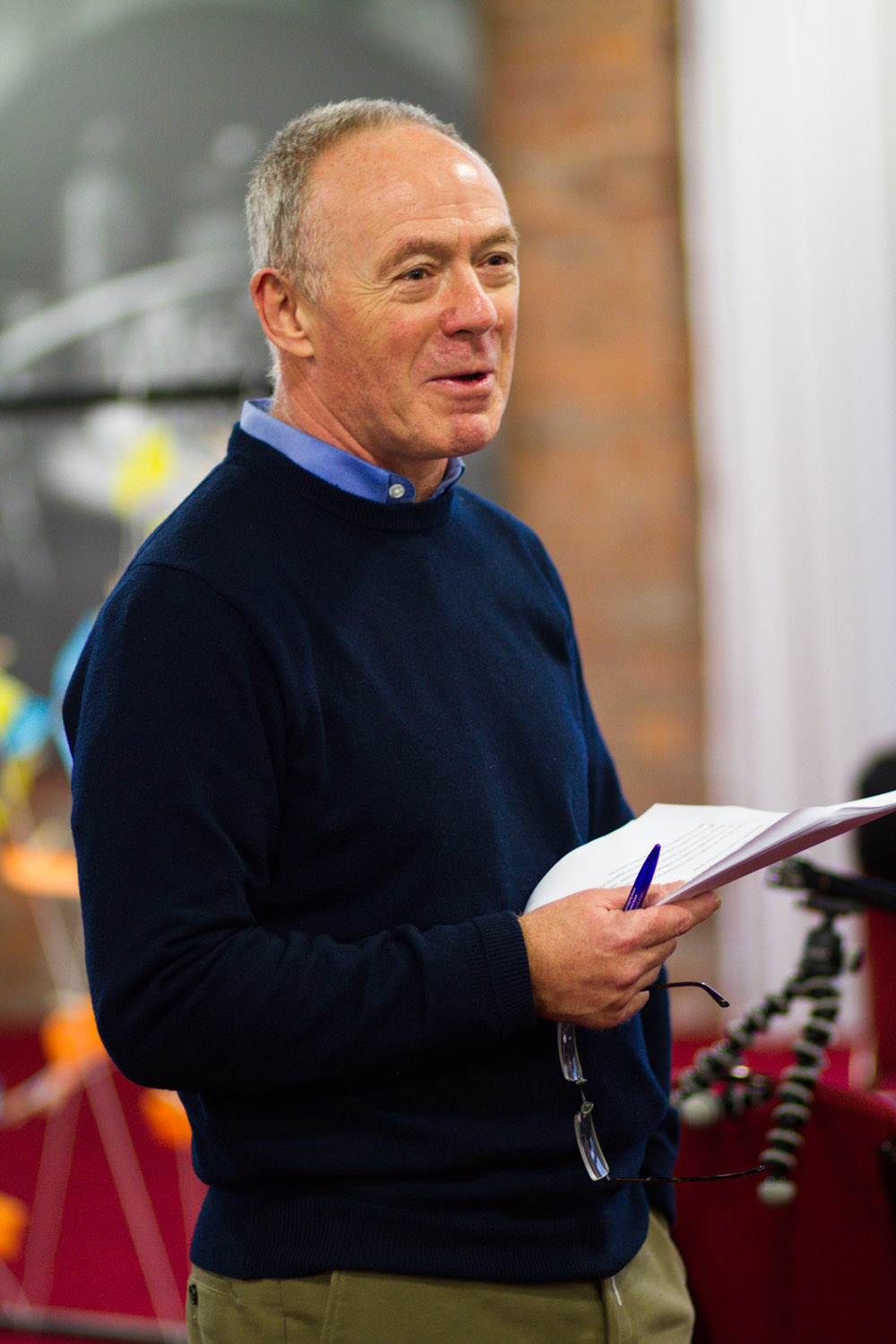

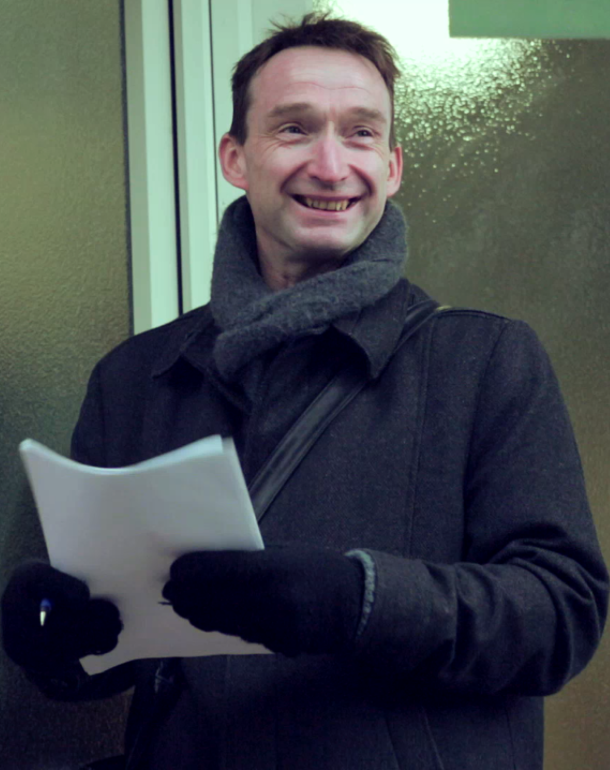

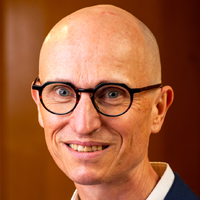
| | First party | Second party | Third party |
|---|---|---|---|
| Leader | Richard Leese | John Leech | Rob Nunney |
| Party | Labour | Liberal Democrats | Green |
| Leader since | 20 May 1996 | 5 May 2016 | 6 May 2021 |
| Leader's seat | Crumpsall | Didsbury West | Woodhouse Park |
| Last election | 31 | 1 | 0 |
| Seats won | 31 | 0 | 1 |
| Seat change | Steady | ▼1 | ▲1 |
Leader of Largest Party before election
Richard Leese
Labour
Leader of Largest Party after election
Richard Leese
Labour

Elections to Manchester City Council were held on 6 May 2021, as part of the 2021 United Kingdom local elections. They were originally scheduled for 2020 but were suspended for a year, due to the COVID-19 pandemic. In 2019 Labour had retained its majority on the council, with 93 seats, with the Liberal Democrats led by former MP John Leech increasing the number of opposition councillors to three, but this had fallen back to two in March 2021 when Councillor Greg Stanton defected to the Labour Party.

== Background and campaign ==
The following councillors, last elected in 2018, did not stand for re-election:

- Labour: Kelly Simcock (Didsbury East), Nigel Murphy (Hulme, deselected), Bernard Stone (Levenshulme), Carl Ollerhead (Moston, suspended by party in June 2020), Maddy Monaghan (Sharston), Mary Watson (Whalley Range).

One councillor from 2018 to 2021, Labour's Emma Taylor, had previously been elected in Ancoats and Beswick and stood this time in a different ward, Sharston.

Two by-elections were outstanding and were held alongside the scheduled elections of 2021: one for the seat of councillor Sue Murphy (Labour, Brooklands, elected 2019), who had died in April 2020, and the other for that of Ken Dobson (Independent, Clayton and Openshaw, elected at a by-election in February 2020), who had resigned from the council in October 2020.

== Result ==
Summary change in vote share compared to the 2019 election. Change in number of seats compared to the composition of the council immediately before the election. Where multiple seats were contested in the same ward due to vacancies the results have been normalised.

Manchester City Council 2021 election
| Party | This election | | | | Full council | | | This election | | |
| Party | Candidates | Seats | Net | Seats % | Other | Total | Total % | Votes | Votes % | +/− |
|---|---|---|---|---|---|---|---|---|---|---|
| Labour | {{{candidates}}} | 33/34 | ▲1 | 97.06 | 61 | 94 | 97.92 | 73,210 | 65.43 | ▲6.83 |
| Green | {{{candidates}}} | 1/34 | ▲1 | 2.94 | 0 | 1 | 1.04 | 12,838 | 11.47 | ▼1.46 |
| Conservative | {{{candidates}}} | 0/34 | Steady | 0.00 | 0 | 0 | 0.00 | 12,120 | 10.83 | ▲4.23 |
| Liberal Democrats | {{{candidates}}} | 0/34 | ▼1 | 0.00 | 1 | 1 | 1.04 | 11,679 | 10.44 | ▼3.58 |
| Independent | {{{candidates}}} | 0/4 | ▼1 | 0.00 | 0 | 0 | 0.00 | 795 | 0.71 | ▼2.22 |
| Monster Raving Loony | {{{candidates}}} | 0/3 | Steady | 0.00 | 0 | 0 | 0.00 | 475 | 0.42 | New |
| Reform | {{{candidates}}} | 0/2 | Steady | 0.00 | 0 | 0 | 0.00 | 387 | 0.35 | New |
| Women's Equality | {{{candidates}}} | 0/3 | Steady | 0.00 | 0 | 0 | 0.00 | 273 | 0.24 | ▼0.20 |
| Communist | {{{candidates}}} | 0/1 | Steady | 0.00 | 0 | 0 | 0.00 | 80 | 0.07 | New |
| SDP | {{{candidates}}} | 0/1 | Steady | 0.00 | 0 | 0 | 0.00 | 29 | 0.03 | New |

== Council composition ==
After the 2019 election, the composition of the council was:

↓
| 93 | 3 |
| Labour | LD |

Immediately prior to the election, the composition of the council was:

↓
| 92 | 2 | 2 |
| Labour | LD | ^{[a]} |

^{a} Vacant seats previously held by Sue Murphy and Kenneth Dobson

After the election, the composition of the council is:

↓
| 94 | 1 | 1 |
| Labour | LD | GP |

== Ward results ==
Asterisks denote incumbent Councillors seeking re-election. Councillors seeking re-election were elected in 2018, and results are compared to that year's polls on that basis.

=== Ancoats and Beswick ===
Ancoats and Beswick
| Party | Candidate | Votes | % | ±% |
|---|---|---|---|---|
| Labour | Marcia Hutchinson | 2,052 | 57.9 | 5.5 ▼ |
| Liberal Democrats | Alan Good | 779 | 22.0 | 12.9 ▲ |
| Green | Ryan Johns | 384 | 10.8 | 6.0 ▼ |
| Conservative | Alexander Bramham | 293 | 8.3 | 2.5 ▼ |
| Majority | | 1,273 | 25.9 | 13.5 ▼ |
| Rejected ballots | | 39 | 1.1 | |
| Turnout | | 3,547 | 30.3 | 9.3 ▲ |
| Registered electors | | 11,702 | | |
| Labour hold | | Swing | 9.2 ▼ | |

=== Ardwick ===
Ardwick
| Party | Candidate | Votes | % | ±% |
|---|---|---|---|---|
| Labour | Bernard Priest* | 2,324 | 77.2 | 6.7 ▼ |
| Green | Kate Walsh Benson | 280 | 9.3 | 4.3 ▲ |
| Conservative | Callum Wood | 256 | 8.5 | 0.1 ▼ |
| Liberal Democrats | Luke Beamish | 150 | 5.0 | 2.5 ▲ |
| Majority | | 2,044 | 66.9 | |
| Rejected ballots | | 39 | 1.3 | |
| Turnout | | 3,049 | 24.18 | 5.1 ▲ |
| Registered electors | | 12,608 | | |
| Labour hold | | Swing | 5.5 ▼ | |

=== Baguley ===
Baguley
| Party | Candidate | Votes | % | ±% |
|---|---|---|---|---|
| Labour Co-op | Tracy Rawlins* | 1,622 | 63.2 | 7.7 ▼ |
| Conservative | Ezra McGowan | 523 | 20.4 | 1.3 ▲ |
| Green | Norm Cassidy | 262 | 10.2 | 6.1 ▲ |
| Liberal Democrats | Seb Bate | 104 | 4.1 | 1.8 ▼ |
| Monster Raving Loony | Merv the Karaoke Kid | 54 | 2.1 | New |
| Majority | | 1,099 | 42.8 | |
| Rejected ballots | | 22 | | |
| Turnout | | 2,587 | 22.6 | 3.0 ▲ |
| Registered electors | | 11,452 | | |
| Labour hold | | Swing | 4.5 ▼ | |

=== Brooklands ===
Brooklands
| Party | Candidate | Votes | % | ±% |
|---|---|---|---|---|
| Labour | Julia Baker-Smith | 1,686 | 53.6 | ▼2.8 |
| Labour | Glynn Evans* | 1,499 | 47.7 | ▼10.3 |
| Conservative | Stephen Carlton-Woods | 689 | 21.9 | ▼5.1 |
| Conservative | Ralph Ellerton | 672 | 21.4 | ▼3.4 |
| Green | Grace Buczkowska | 385 | 12.2 | ▲1.1 |
| Green | Maggie Hoffgen | 211 | 6.7 | ▼4.4 |
| Liberal Democrats | Nick Saunders | 112 | 3.6 | ▼1.2 |
| Liberal Democrats | Mark Saunders | 75 | 2.4 | ▼2.4 |
| Monster Raving Loony | Lord Cam | 57 | 1.8 | new |
| Majority | | | | |
| Rejected ballots | | 27 | | |
| Turnout | | 3,145 | 28.29 | |
| Registered electors | | 11,116 | | |
| Labour hold | | Swing | | |
| Labour hold | | Swing | | |

=== Burnage ===
Burnage
| Party | Candidate | Votes | % | ±% |
|---|---|---|---|---|
| Labour | Bev Craig* | 3,036 | 72.2 | 1.8 ▼ |
| Conservative | Shahed Hossain | 421 | 10.0 | 3.3 ▲ |
| Green | Brian Candeland | 341 | 8.1 | 4.2 ▲ |
| Liberal Democrats | Jamie Dwan | 270 | 6.4 | 9.0 ▼ |
| Independent | Andrea Timoney | 137 | 3.3 | New |
| Majority | | 2,615 | 62.2 | |
| Rejected ballots | | 43 | 1.0 | |
| Turnout | | 4,248 | 30.7 | |
| Registered electors | | 13,045 | | |
| Labour hold | | Swing | 2.6 ▼ | |

=== Charlestown ===
Charlestown
| Party | Candidate | Votes | % | ±% |
|---|---|---|---|---|
| Labour | Hannah Priest* | 1,910 | 64.1 | 6.2 ▼ |
| Conservative | Michael Ciotkowski | 522 | 17.5 | 1.3 ▲ |
| Reform | Martin Power | 247 | 8.3 | New |
| Green | Anne Power | 190 | 6.4 | 2.5 ▲ |
| Liberal Democrats | Melanie Ncube | 109 | 3.7 | 1.2 ▲ |
| Majority | | 1388 | 46.6 | |
| Rejected ballots | | 25 | 0.8 | |
| Turnout | | 3,003 | 24.76 | |
| Registered electors | | 12,130 | | |
| Labour hold | | Swing | 3.8 ▼ | |

=== Cheetham ===
Cheetham
| Party | Candidate | Votes | % | ±% |
|---|---|---|---|---|
| Labour | Shaukat Ali* | 3,061 | 79.7 | 9.5 ▼ |
| Conservative | Arbab Khan | 369 | 9.6 | 3.9 ▲ |
| Green | Ben Dundas | 250 | 6.5 | 3.6 ▲ |
| Liberal Democrats | Roddy Morrison | 159 | 4.1 | 1.4 ▲ |
| Majority | | 2692 | 70.1 | |
| Rejected ballots | | 44 | | |
| Turnout | | 3,883 | 29.47 | 2.2 ▼ |
| Registered electors | | 13,178 | | |
| Labour hold | | Swing | 6.7 ▼ | |

=== Chorlton ===
Chorlton
| Party | Candidate | Votes | % | ±% |
|---|---|---|---|---|
| Labour Co-op | Eve Holt* | 3,656 | 68.0 | 3.2 ▲ |
| Green | Mary Crumpton | 917 | 17.1 | 2.4 ▲ |
| Conservative | Kath Fitzgibbon | 368 | 6.8 | 1.5 ▲ |
| Liberal Democrats | Robin Grayson | 291 | 5.4 | 5.6 ▼ |
| Women's Equality | Jo Heathcote | 141 | 2.6 | 0.6 ▼ |
| Majority | | 2739 | 50.9 | |
| Rejected ballots | | 40 | 0.7 | |
| Turnout | | 5,413 | 51.03 | 4.7 ▲ |
| Registered electors | | 10,608 | | |
| Labour Co-op hold | | Swing | 0.4 ▲ | |

=== Chorlton Park ===
Chorlton Park
| Party | Candidate | Votes | % | ±% |
|---|---|---|---|---|
| Labour Co-op | Mandie Shilton Godwin* | 3,819 | 69.2 | 6.7 ▲ |
| Green | Richard Walton | 773 | 14.0 | 6.0 ▲ |
| Conservative | Connor Cooper | 472 | 8.5 | 4.5 ▲ |
| Liberal Democrats | Amaan Hashmi | 457 | 8.3 | 17.2 ▼ |
| Majority | | 3046 | 55.2 | |
| Rejected ballots | | 65 | 1.2 | |
| Turnout | | 5,586 | 42.3 | 1.0 ▲ |
| Registered electors | | 13,218 | | |
| Labour Co-op hold | | Swing | 0.4 ▲ | |

=== Clayton and Openshaw ===
Clayton and Openshaw
| Party | Candidate | Votes | % | ±% |
|---|---|---|---|---|
| Labour | Donna Ludford* | 2,064 | 69.3 | |
| Labour | Thomas Robinson | 1,560 | 52.4 | |
| Conservative | Keith Berry | 389 | 13.1 | |
| Green | Daniel Kyle | 250 | 8.4 | |
| Liberal Democrats | Diele Nsumbu | 218 | 7.3 | |
| Green | Robyn Schreibke | 204 | 6.9 | |
| Conservative | Ramzi Swaray-Kella | 193 | 6.5 | |
| Liberal Democrats | Martha O'Donoghue | 120 | 4.0 | |
| Majority | | | | |
| Rejected ballots | | 32 | | |
| Turnout | | 2,978 | 23.98 | |
| Registered electors | | 12,553 | | |
| Labour hold | | Swing | | |
| Labour gain from Independent | | Swing | | |

=== Crumpsall ===
Crumpsall
| Party | Candidate | Votes | % | ±% |
|---|---|---|---|---|
| Labour | Nasrin Ali* | 2,341 | 66.4 | 14.6 ▼ |
| Conservative | Iftikhar Ahmed Butt | 762 | 21.6 | 11.8 ▲ |
| Green | Alison Hawdale | 291 | 8.3 | 3.5 ▲ |
| Liberal Democrats | Michael McKinstry | 130 | 3.7 | 1.6 ▲ |
| Majority | | 1,579 | 44.8 | |
| Rejected ballots | | 39 | 1.1 | |
| Turnout | | 3,563 | 30.0 | 4.0 ▼ |
| Registered electors | | 11,583 | | |
| Labour hold | | Swing | 13.2 ▼ | |

=== Deansgate ===
Deansgate
| Party | Candidate | Votes | % | ±% |
|---|---|---|---|---|
| Labour Co-op | Marcus Johns* | 1,245 | 53.9 | 12.8 ▲ |
| Liberal Democrats | John Bridges | 583 | 25.3 | 0.6 ▲ |
| Green | Chris Ogden | 256 | 11.1 | 9.9 ▼ |
| Conservative | James Flanagan | 164 | 7.1 | 5.0 ▼ |
| Women's Equality | Samantha Days | 60 | 2.6 | 8.6 ▼ |
| Majority | | 662 | 32.6 | ▲12.2 |
| Rejected ballots | | 16 | 0.7 | |
| Turnout | | 2,324 | 28.9 | 9.5 ▲ |
| Registered electors | | 8,047 | | |
| Labour hold | | Swing | 6.1 ▲ | |

=== Didsbury East ===
Didsbury East
| Party | Candidate | Votes | % | ±% |
|---|---|---|---|---|
| Labour | Linda Foley | 2,972 | 51.0 | 1.2 ▼ |
| Liberal Democrats | John Cameron | 2,082 | 35.7 | 1.5 ▼ |
| Green | Liberty Franley | 503 | 8.6 | 4.8 ▲ |
| Conservative | Anjenarra Huque | 276 | 4.7 | 2.1 ▼ |
| Majority | | 890 | 15.3 | |
| Rejected ballots | | 32 | 0.5 | |
| Turnout | | 5,865 | 52.0 | 8.4 ▲ |
| Registered electors | | 11,283 | | |
| Labour hold | | Swing | 0.2 ▲ | |

=== Didsbury West ===
Didsbury West
| Party | Candidate | Votes | % | ±% |
|---|---|---|---|---|
| Labour | Debbie Hilal | 2,523 | 44.9 | ▲4.5 |
| Liberal Democrats | Richard Kilpatrick* | 2,282 | 40.6 | ▼3.0 |
| Green | Jake Welsh | 408 | 7.3 | ▲2.8 |
| Conservative | Luke Bourke Costello | 309 | 5.5 | ▼0.3 |
| Women's Equality | Sarika Paul | 72 | 1.3 | New |
| SDP | Wendy Andrew | 29 | 0.5 | New |
| Majority | | 241 | 4.3 | |
| Rejected ballots | | 31 | 0.6 | |
| Turnout | | 5,654 | 45.8 | 1.7 ▼ |
| Registered electors | | 12,335 | | |
| Labour gain from Liberal Democrats | | Swing | 3.8 ▲ | |

=== Fallowfield ===
Fallowfield
| Party | Candidate | Votes | % | ±% |
|---|---|---|---|---|
| Labour | Zahra Alijah* | 1,583 | 71.1 | 7.0 ▼ |
| Green | George Morris | 342 | 15.4 | 9.2 ▲ |
| Conservative | Sabreena Hossain | 209 | 9.4 | 2.7 ▲ |
| Liberal Democrats | Paul Jones | 92 | 4.1 | 5.0 ▼ |
| Majority | | 1,241 | 55.7 | |
| Rejected ballots | | 23 | 1.0 | |
| Turnout | | 2,249 | 19.78 | 2.8 ▲ |
| Registered electors | | 11,394 | | |
| Labour hold | | Swing | 8.1 ▼ | |

=== Gorton and Abbey Hey ===
Gorton and Abbey Hey
| Party | Candidate | Votes | % | ±% |
|---|---|---|---|---|
| Labour Co-op | Julie Reid* | 2,372 | 70.7 | 6.0 ▲ |
| Liberal Democrats | Jackie Pearcey | 440 | 13.1 | 7.6 ▼ |
| Conservative | Ugo Nzeribe | 378 | 11.3 | 0.3 ▼ |
| Green | Scott Robinson | 165 | 4.9 | 1.9 ▲ |
| Majority | | 1,932 | 57.6 | |
| Rejected ballots | | 57 | 1.7 | |
| Turnout | | 3,412 | 25.8 | 1.8 ▲ |
| Registered electors | | 13,243 | | |
| Labour Co-op hold | | Swing | 6.8 ▲ | |

=== Harpurhey ===
Harpurhey
| Party | Candidate | Votes | % | ±% |
|---|---|---|---|---|
| Labour | Joanne Green* | 1,901 | 68.7 | 8.8 ▼ |
| Conservative | Gareth Brown | 503 | 18.2 | 2.1 ▲ |
| Green | Vicky Matthews | 228 | 8.2 | 3.7 ▲ |
| Liberal Democrats | Celia Craske | 136 | 4.9 | New |
| Majority | | 1,398 | 50.5 | |
| Rejected ballots | | 41 | 1.5 | |
| Turnout | | 2,809 | 22.1 | 2.0 ▲ |
| Registered electors | | 12,710 | | |
| Labour hold | | Swing | 5.5 ▼ | |

=== Higher Blackley ===
Higher Blackley
| Party | Candidate | Votes | % | ±% |
|---|---|---|---|---|
| Labour | Shelley Lanchbury* | 1,805 | 67.8 | 7.2 ▼ |
| Conservative | Colin Jones | 498 | 18.7 | 2.0 ▲ |
| Green | Antje Timmermann | 164 | 6.2 | 2.0 ▲ |
| Liberal Democrats | Peter Matthews | 119 | 4.5 | 0.4 ▲ |
| Independent | Stephen Moran | 75 | 2.8 | New |
| Majority | | 1,307 | 49.1 | |
| Rejected ballots | | 30 | 1.1 | |
| Turnout | | 2,691 | 23.8 | 1.1 ▲ |
| Registered electors | | 11,308 | | |
| Labour hold | | Swing | 4.6 ▼ | |

=== Hulme ===
Hulme
| Party | Candidate | Votes | % | ±% |
|---|---|---|---|---|
| Labour | Ekua Bayunu | 2,313 | 69.0 | 4.3 ▼ |
| Green | Lottie Donovan | 596 | 17.8 | 4.8 ▲ |
| Liberal Democrats | Gary McKenna | 223 | 6.7 | 0.6 ▼ |
| Conservative | William Watermeyer | 219 | 6.5 | 0.0 |
| Majority | | 1,717 | 51.2 | |
| Rejected ballots | | 38 | 1.1 | |
| Turnout | | 3,389 | 26.5 | 4.2 ▲ |
| Registered electors | | 12,804 | | |
| Labour hold | | Swing | 4.6 ▼ | |

=== Levenshulme ===
Levenshulme
| Party | Candidate | Votes | % | ±% |
|---|---|---|---|---|
| Labour | Zareen Hussain | 3,136 | 66.3 | 11.6 ▼ |
| Green | Dick Venes | 599 | 12.7 | 5.8 ▲ |
| Independent | Jeremy Hoad | 540 | 11.4 | New |
| Liberal Democrats | Greg Sammons | 248 | 5.2 | 4.7 ▼ |
| Conservative | Alexandru Stancu | 205 | 4.3 | 0.5 ▲ |
| Majority | | 2,537 | 53.6 | |
| Rejected ballots | | 46 | 1.0 | |
| Turnout | | 4,774 | 36.4 | 2.4 ▲ |
| Registered electors | | 13,125 | | |
| Labour hold | | Swing | 9.7 ▼ | |

=== Longsight ===
Longsight
| Party | Candidate | Votes | % | ±% |
|---|---|---|---|---|
| Labour | Luthfur Rahman* | 2,782 | 71.3 | 15.2 ▼ |
| Conservative | Usman Arshed | 674 | 17.3 | 11.7 ▲ |
| Green | Bernard Eckbery | 192 | 4.9 | 2.7 ▲ |
| Liberal Democrats | Kobe Bibbon | 174 | 4.5 | 0.3 ▲ |
| Communist | Aaron Andrew | 80 | 2.1 | New |
| Majority | | 2,108 | 54.0 | |
| Rejected ballots | | 44 | 1.1 | |
| Turnout | | 3,946 | 30.2 | 1.2 ▲ |
| Registered electors | | 13,086 | | |
| Labour hold | | Swing | 13.5 ▼ | |

=== Miles Platting and Newton Heath ===
Miles Platting and Newton Heath
| Party | Candidate | Votes | % | ±% |
|---|---|---|---|---|
| Labour | June Hitchin* | 1,997 | 69.8 | 10.3 ▼ |
| Conservative | Paul Wan | 336 | 11.7 | 1.3 ▲ |
| Green | Paul Hodges | 269 | 9.4 | 5.6 ▲ |
| Reform | Derek Brocklehurst | 140 | 4.9 | New |
| Liberal Democrats | Samuel Olanrewaju | 118 | 4.1 | New |
| Majority | | 1,661 | 58.1 | |
| Rejected ballots | | 32 | 1.1 | |
| Turnout | | 2,892 | 22.2 | 0.2 ▼ |
| Registered electors | | 13,032 | | |
| Labour hold | | Swing | 5.8 ▼ | |

=== Moss Side ===
Moss Side
| Party | Candidate | Votes | % | ±% |
|---|---|---|---|---|
| Labour | Emily Rowles* | 2,883 | 81.8 | 5.7 ▼ |
| Green | Albie Mayo | 294 | 8.3 | 4.0 ▲ |
| Conservative | Shaden Jaradat | 204 | 5.8 | 1.7 ▲ |
| Liberal Democrats | Norman Lewis | 142 | 4.0 | 0.1 ▼ |
| Majority | | 2,589 | 73.5 | |
| Rejected ballots | | 53 | 1.5 | |
| Turnout | | 3,576 | 26.0 | 1.9 ▼ |
| Registered electors | | 13,745 | | |
| Labour hold | | Swing | 4.9 ▼ | |

=== Moston ===
Moston
| Party | Candidate | Votes | % | ±% |
|---|---|---|---|---|
| Labour | Julie Connolly | 2,249 | 65.0 | 7.2 ▼ |
| Conservative | Stephen Alabi | 719 | 20.8 | 2.3 ▼ |
| Green | Diane Kosandiak | 328 | 9.5 | 4.8 ▲ |
| Liberal Democrats | Robbie Cowbury | 122 | 3.5 | New |
| Independent | Hugo Wils | 43 | 1.2 | New |
| Majority | | 1,530 | 44.2 | |
| Rejected ballots | | 27 | 0.8 | |
| Turnout | | 3,488 | 26.5 | 0.5 ▲ |
| Registered electors | | 13,143 | | |
| Labour hold | | Swing | 2.5 ▼ | |

=== Northenden ===
Northenden
| Party | Candidate | Votes | % | ±% |
|---|---|---|---|---|
| Labour | Sam Lynch* | 1,859 | 60.5 | 7.5 ▼ |
| Conservative | Stephen McHugh | 610 | 19.9 | 1.2 ▲ |
| Monster Raving Loony | Sir Oink A-Lot | 364 | 11.9 | 10.7 ▲ |
| Liberal Democrats | Ellin Saunders | 143 | 4.7 | 1.9 ▼ |
| Green | Sylvia Buchan | 95 | 3.1 | 2.4 ▼ |
| Majority | | 1,249 | 40.6 | |
| Rejected ballots | | 22 | 0.7 | |
| Turnout | | 3,093 | 28.0 | 2.9 ▲ |
| Registered electors | | 11,032 | | |
| Labour hold | | Swing | 4.4 ▼ | |

=== Old Moat ===
Old Moat
| Party | Candidate | Votes | % | ±% |
|---|---|---|---|---|
| Labour | Gavin White* | 2,568 | 72.4 | 3.6 ▲ |
| Green | Stacey Wright | 476 | 13.6 | 3.0 ▼ |
| Liberal Democrats | Jon Martin | 238 | 6.8 | 7.2 ▼ |
| Conservative | Gary Wilkinson | 218 | 6.2 | 0.3 ▼ |
| Majority | | 2,092 | 59.8 | |
| Rejected ballots | | 36 | 1.0 | |
| Turnout | | 3,536 | 30.0 | 2.2 ▲ |
| Registered electors | | 11,774 | | |
| Labour hold | | Swing | 3.3 ▲ | |

=== Piccadilly ===
Piccadilly
| Party | Candidate | Votes | % | ±% |
|---|---|---|---|---|
| Labour | Jon-Connor Lyons* | 1,381 | 62.1 | 4.4 ▲ |
| Green | Chris Perriam | 438 | 19.7 | 4.6 ▼ |
| Liberal Democrats | Chris Northwood | 250 | 11.2 | 9.3 ▼ |
| Conservative | Siqi Lin | 156 | 7.0 | 1.3 ▼ |
| Majority | | 943 | 42.4 | |
| Rejected ballots | | 12 | 0.5 | 0.1 ▲ |
| Turnout | | 2,237 | 28.7 | 8.6 ▲ |
| Registered electors | | 7,783 | | |
| Labour hold | | Swing | 4.5 ▲ | |

=== Rusholme ===
Rusholme
| Party | Candidate | Votes | % | ±% |
|---|---|---|---|---|
| Labour | Jill Lovecy* | 2,491 | 75.5 | 6.7 ▼ |
| Green | Natasha Turner | 374 | 11.3 | 6.6 ▲ |
| Conservative | Fahim Choudhury | 306 | 9.2 | 4.7 ▲ |
| Liberal Democrats | Melvin Sowah | 127 | 3.9 | 4.7 ▼ |
| Majority | | 2,117 | 64.2 | |
| Rejected ballots | | 19 | 0.6 | |
| Turnout | | 3,317 | 26.7 | 0.5 ▼ |
| Registered electors | | 12,315 | | |
| Labour hold | | Swing | 6.7 ▼ | |

=== Sharston ===
Sharston
| Party | Candidate | Votes | % | ±% |
|---|---|---|---|---|
| Labour | Emma Taylor | 1,866 | 70.1 | 5.2 ▼ |
| Conservative | Tony Welch | 567 | 21.3 | 6.3 ▲ |
| Green | Astrid Johnson | 207 | 7.8 | 4.1 ▲ |
| Liberal Democrats | Bryn Coombe | 23 | 0.9 | 5.1 ▼ |
| Majority | | 1,299 | 48.8 | |
| Rejected ballots | | 25 | 0.9 | |
| Turnout | | 2,688 | 23.1 | 3.3 ▲ |
| Registered electors | | 11,659 | | |
| Labour hold | | Swing | 5.8 ▼ | |

=== Whalley Range ===
Whalley Range
| Party | Candidate | Votes | % | ±% |
|---|---|---|---|---|
| Labour | Muqaddasah Bano | 2,733 | 68.3 | 4.1 ▲ |
| Green | Beth McManus | 955 | 23.9 | 5.2 ▼ |
| Conservative | Andrew Tang | 210 | 5.3 | 1.7 ▲ |
| Liberal Democrats | Andrew McGuinness | 102 | 2.6 | 0.5 ▼ |
| Majority | | 1,778 | 44.4 | |
| Rejected ballots | | 30 | 0.7 | |
| Turnout | | 4,030 | 34.6 | 2.3 ▼ |
| Registered electors | | 11,649 | | |
| Labour hold | | Swing | 4.7 ▲ | |

=== Withington ===
Withington
| Party | Candidate | Votes | % | ±% |
|---|---|---|---|---|
| Labour Co-op | Chris Wills* | 2,146 | 54.2 | ▲5.1 |
| Liberal Democrats | April Preston | 1,277 | 32.3 | ▼0.8 |
| Green | Sam Easterby-Smith | 377 | 9.5 | ▼5.9 |
| Conservative | Cameron Cosh | 158 | 4.0 | ▼0.5 |
| Majority | | 869 | 21.9 | |
| Rejected ballots | | 23 | 0.6 | |
| Turnout | | 3,981 | 34.1 | ▲3.6 |
| Registered electors | | 11,718 | | |
| Labour Co-op hold | | Swing | ▲3.0 | |

=== Woodhouse Park ===
Woodhouse Park
| Party | Candidate | Votes | % | ±% |
|---|---|---|---|---|
| Green | Rob Nunney | 1,355 | 48.0 | 45.2 ▲ |
| Labour | Brian O'Neil* | 1,180 | 41.8 | 32.3 ▼ |
| Conservative | Ken Wedderburn | 244 | 8.6 | 9.2 ▼ |
| Liberal Democrats | Anna Hablak | 42 | 1.5 | 3.8 ▼ |
| Majority | | 175 | 6.2 | N/A |
| Rejected ballots | | 25 | 0.9 | |
| Turnout | | 2,846 | 25.4 | 6.4 ▲ |
| Registered electors | | 11,185 | | |
| Green gain from Labour | | Swing | 38.8 ▲ | |

== Changes since this election ==
=== Chorlton by-election ===
On 14 October 2021 councillor Matt Strong resigned from his seat in Chorlton, prompting a by-election that was held on 18 November 2021.

Changes in the table below are relative to the 2019 election.

By-election: Chorlton - 18 November 2021
| Party | Candidate | Votes | % | ±% |
|---|---|---|---|---|
| Labour | Mathew Benham | 1,581 | 52.1 | 4.9▼ |
| Liberal Democrats | Rosie Hughes | 657 | 21.7 | 8.9▲ |
| Green | Simon Milner-Edwards | 608 | 20.0 | 1.0▼ |
| Conservative | Kathleen Fitzgibbon | 93 | 3.1 | 1.6▼ |
| Women's Equality | Jo Heathcote | 66 | 2.2 | 1.1▼ |
| Independent | Paul Harnett | 27 | 0.9 | n/a |
| Majority | | 924 | 30.5 | 5.2▼ |
| Rejected ballots | | 2 | 0.07 | 0.6▼ |
| Turnout | | 3,032 | 28.1 | 22.9▼ |
| Registered electors | | 10,795 | | |
| Labour hold | | Swing | 6.9▼ | |

=== Ancoats & Beswick by-election ===
On 30 November 2021 councillor Marcia Hutchinson resigned from her seat in Ancoats & Beswick, citing allegations of bullying and racism within the Labour group. A by-election was held on 3 February 2022, which was won by the Liberal Democrat candidate Alan Good.

By-election: Ancoats & Beswick - 3 February 2022
| Party | Candidate | Votes | % | ±% |
|---|---|---|---|---|
| Liberal Democrats | Alan Good | 1,113 | 53.2 | 31.0▲ |
| Labour | Gareth Worthington | 793 | 37.9 | 20.6▼ |
| Green | Chris Perriam | 119 | 5.7 | 5.3▼ |
| Conservative | Alexander Bramham | 66 | 3.2 | 5.8▼ |
| Majority | | 320 | 15.3 | 10.6▼ |
| Turnout | | 2,091 | 17.84 | 12.5▼ |
| Liberal Democrats gain from Labour | | Swing | 25.6▲ | |
