= Bev Craig =

British politician (born 1985)

Bev Craig OBE
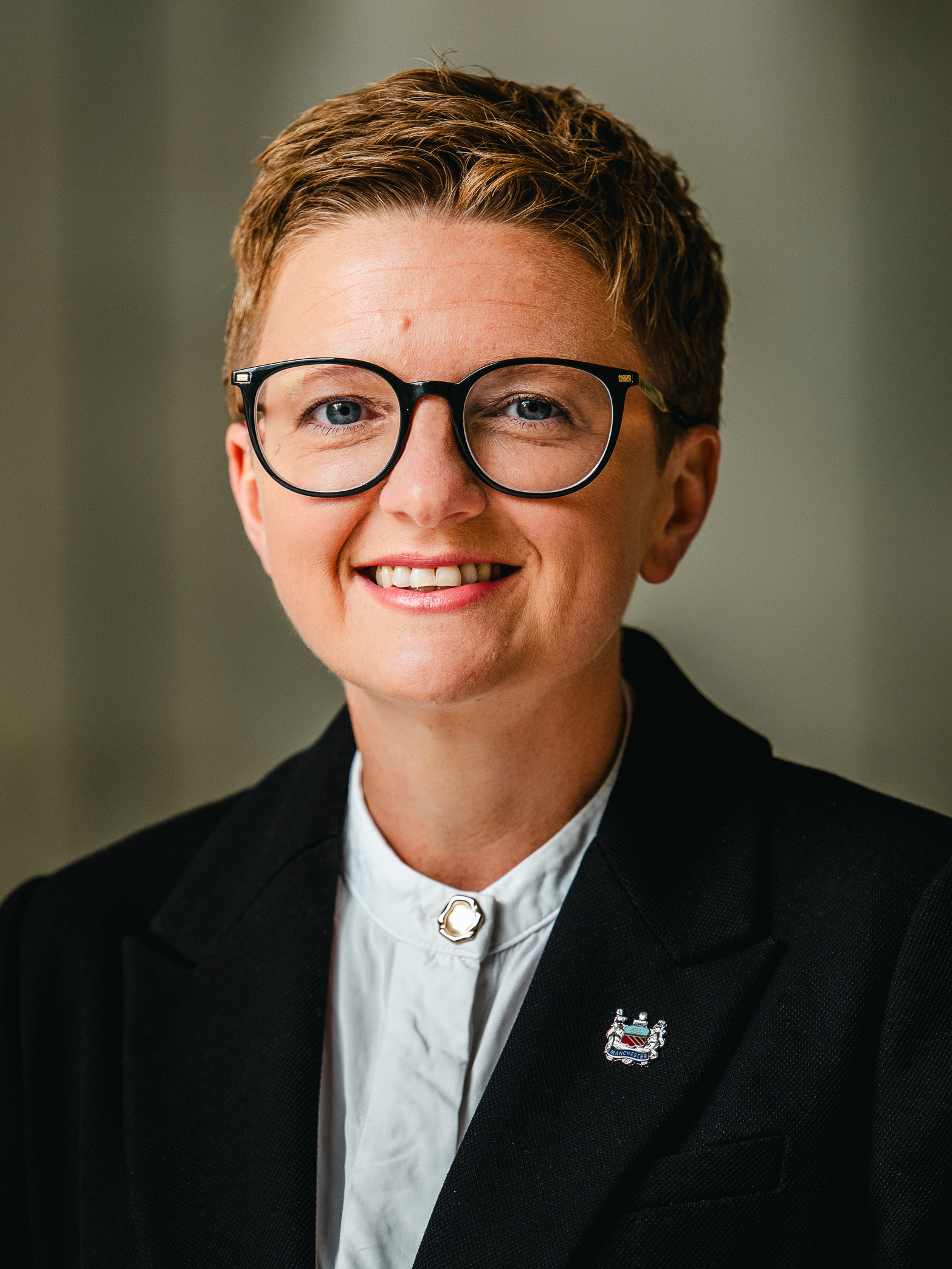
- Official portrait, 2025

Mayor of Greater Manchester
- Incumbent
- Assumed office 3 August 2026
- Deputy: Paul Dennett
- Preceded by: Andy Burnham (Note: Paul Dennett acted from 19 June 2026 to 3 August 2026)

Leader of Manchester City Council
- In office 1 December 2021 – 3 August 2026
- Preceded by: Richard Leese
- Succeeded by: Garry Bridges

Member of the Greater Manchester Combined Authority for Economy, Business and Inclusive Growth
- In office 1 December 2021 – 3 August 2026
- Preceded by: Richard Leese
- Succeeded by: Garry Bridges

Deputy Leader of Manchester City Council
- In office 19 May 2021 – 1 December 2021 Serving with Luthfur Rahman

Member of Manchester City Council for Burnage
- In office 5 May 2011 – 3 August 2026 Serving with Azra Ali and Murtaza Iqbal
- Preceded by: John Cameron
- Succeeded by: Carl Austin-Behan

Personal details
- Born: Beverley Anne Craig; 27 January 1985 (age 41) Belfast, Northern Ireland
- Party: Labour Co-op
- Education: Belfast High School; University of Manchester; University of Warwick

Beverley Anne Craig (born 27 January 1985) is a British Labour Co-op politician who has served as the mayor of Greater Manchester since August 2026.

Craig previously served as Leader of Manchester City Council from December 2021 to August 2026 and had represented Burnage as a councillor from 2011 to 2026. Following the disqualification of Andy Burnham as a result of his election as an MP, Craig was elected Mayor of Greater Manchester on 30 July 2026, defeating Reform UK candidate Sian Astley in the final round of the mayoral by-election. As mayor, she is an ex officio member, and chair, of the Greater Manchester Combined Authority. Craig is the first woman and the first openly LGBTQ+ person to lead Manchester City Council. Her election as mayor also made her the first woman elected to lead the Greater Manchester Combined Authority, and Britain's second openly gay directly elected metro mayor, after Andy Street.

== Early life and education ==
Craig was born in Belfast, Northern Ireland, on 27 January 1985. She grew up in a Unionist and Ulster Protestant family on a council estate outside Belfast, and moved to Manchester in 2003 to attend the Victoria University of Manchester (now part of the University of Manchester).

Speaking about her upbringing, Craig told the BBC: "I grew up in social housing and my family still rely on it. I know the value of [what] the safety net of a good quality home can give you when times are tough". She also said that she wanted "to reach a point where me being a woman and being gay is entirely uninteresting and unremarkable".

Craig graduated from the University of Manchester in 2007 with a degree in politics and modern history. While working full-time, she later gained a postgraduate qualification in local government management from Warwick Business School and a Master of Arts degree in public policy and governance from the University of Manchester.

Before entering senior political office, Craig worked in local government, higher education and the trade union movement, including for the public-service trade union UNISON.

== Political career ==
=== Manchester City Council (2011–2026) ===
Craig was elected to Manchester City Council for Burnage at the 2011 local elections. During her early career on the council, she held a number of policy and scrutiny positions before joining the council executive.

She was re-elected in 2012, 2016, 2021, and 2024.

From 2017 until 2021, Craig served as Executive Member for Adult Services, Health, Wellbeing and Inclusion. She was also Deputy Chair of Manchester Health and Care Commissioning and co-chair of the Manchester Local Care Organisation, which coordinates health and social-care services between Manchester City Council and local NHS bodies.

==== Deputy Leader of Manchester City Council (May–Dec 2021) ====
Following the 2021 local elections, Craig was elected Deputy Leader of Manchester City Council on 19 May 2021, serving alongside Luthfur Rahman. Her election made her the council's first openly gay deputy leader, while Rahman became its first deputy leader of Bangladeshi heritage.

==== Leader of Manchester City Council (2021–2026) ====
In October 2021, Craig was elected Leader of the Manchester Labour Group and selected to succeed Sir Richard Leese, who had led Manchester City Council since 1996.

Craig formally became Leader of Manchester City Council at a full council meeting on 1 December 2021 following Leese's retirement. She became both the first woman and the first openly LGBTQ+ person to lead the council.

As council leader, Craig became Manchester's representative on the Greater Manchester Combined Authority. She was given responsibility for the Economy, Business and Inclusive Growth portfolio, covering areas including employment, business support, investment and regional economic development.

Craig has also served as Vice-Chair of the Greater Manchester Combined Authority and Vice-Chair of the Local Government Association. She previously served as Chair of Core Cities UK, a network representing the largest UK cities outside London.

In the 2026 New Year Honours, Craig was appointed an Officer of the Order of the British Empire (OBE) "for services to local government".

=== 2026 Greater Manchester mayoral by-election ===
Following Andy Burnham's disqualification as Mayor of Greater Manchester after his election to Parliament, Craig was selected as the Labour and Co-operative Party candidate in the 2026 Greater Manchester mayoral by-election. Following Burnham's departure, Deputy Mayor Paul Dennett exercised the functions of mayor on an acting basis pending the election.

Craig stood against six other candidates, including Reform UK candidate Sian Niamh Astley.

Polling took place on 30 July 2026 using the supplementary vote system. Craig received 47 per cent of first-preference votes, while Astley received 21 per cent. As no candidate secured more than 50 per cent of the first-preference vote, eligible second preferences cast by those who voted for eliminated candidates were redistributed.

Craig was declared elected on 31 July after receiving 66.3 per cent of the final-round vote, compared with 33.7 per cent for Astley. The result made Craig the first woman elected Mayor of Greater Manchester and continued Labour's uninterrupted control of the office since the mayoralty was established in 2017. Turnout was approximately 25 per cent.

Her mayoral term of office began on 3 August 2026. (Note: Mayoral terms of office run from the fourth day after polling day.) At that point she ceased to be a councillor on Manchester City Council, as elected mayors are disqualified from also being councillors.

=== Mayor of Greater Manchester (2026–present) ===
On 3 August 2026, Craig officially assumed office as Mayor and shortly afterwards she announced that Burnham's Deputy Mayors Kate Green and Paul Dennett would be reappointed as Deputy Mayors under her.

Since taking office as Mayor of Greater Manchester in August 2026, Craig has begun to establish an agenda centred on housing, regeneration, economic growth, transport and stronger local communities. Her approach represents considerable continuity with the wider Greater Manchester model developed under Andy Burnham, but she has placed particular emphasis on neighbourhoods and town centres rather than concentrating solely on Manchester city centre.

Housing has quickly become one of the defining priorities of Craig's early administration. She has set an ambition for 50,000 council and genuinely affordable homes, with a particular emphasis on increasing the supply of social housing. Her administration has proposed using publicly owned land more effectively through a Greater Manchester public-sector land bank, while an initial target is to deliver 10,000 new social homes by May 2028. This represents an attempt to use the combined authority's existing housing powers and public land holdings to increase the supply of homes that are affordable to people on ordinary incomes, rather than relying predominantly on private development.

== Political positions ==
Craig was a founding member and interim co-chair of Open Labour. In a 2017 statement, she described the organisation as an "unashamedly left wing voice" focused on making Labour credible and capable of governing locally, regionally and nationally.

During the 2026 mayoral campaign, Craig placed the cost of living, public transport, housing, policing and economic growth among her main priorities. She supported maintaining affordable public-transport fares and expanding the Bee Network.

On housing, Craig supported increasing the supply of council and affordable homes across Greater Manchester.

Craig also backed increased neighbourhood policing and closer cooperation between Greater Manchester Police, local councils and housing providers to address crime and antisocial behaviour.

Her campaign also emphasised supporting businesses, attracting investment, improving skills and ensuring that economic growth benefited communities across Greater Manchester.

== Personal life ==
Craig is a lesbian and has described herself as "one of the most visible lesbians in politics". She has spoken publicly about comments directed at her appearance and sexuality during her political career.

== Notes ==
Political offices
Preceded by Richard Leese	Leader of Manchester City Council; 2021–2026	Succeeded by Garry Bridges
Preceded by Andy Burnham	Mayor of Greater Manchester; 2026–present	Incumbent
