= 2023 Manchester City Council election =

2023 local government election in Manchester

- 4 May 2023

33 of 96 seats on Manchester City Council 49 seats needed for a majority
- Turnout: 96,219
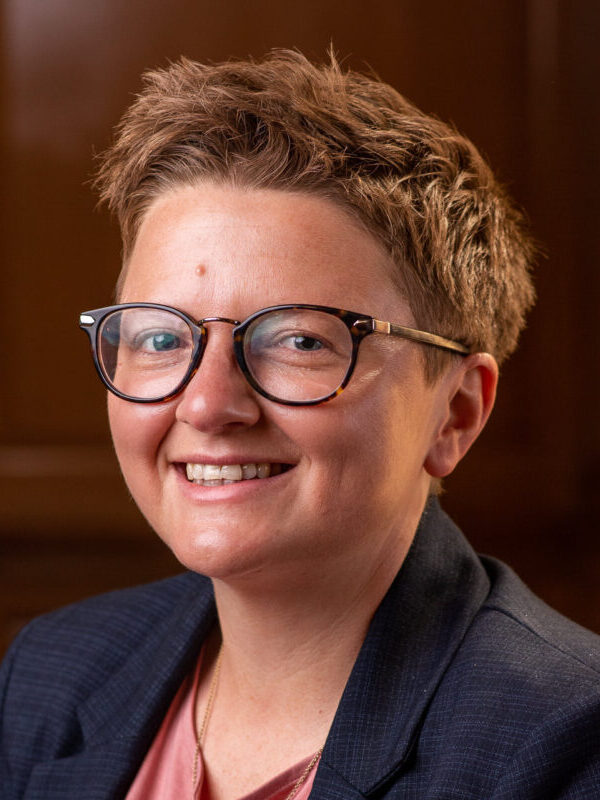

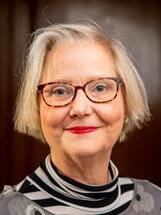

	First party	Second party	Third party
Leader	Bev Craig	Astrid Johnson	John Leech
Party	Labour	Green	Liberal Democrats
Last election	30 (65.8%)	1 (11.4%)	1 (12.6%)
Seats before	91	3	2
Seats won	30	1	2
Seats after	88	4	4
Seat change	▼3	▲1	▲2
Popular vote	62,003	13,467	11,657
Percentage	64.6%	14.0%	12.2%
Swing	▼0.35%
- Map of the wards of Manchester City Council coloured by winning party
Leader before election
Bev Craig
Labour
Leader after election
Bev Craig
Labour

The 2023 Manchester City Council elections took place on 4 May 2023 alongside other local elections across the United Kingdom. One third of councillors (32) on Manchester City Council were elected, along with a mid-term vacancy in the Ardwick ward.

Labour retained its majority on the council.

== Background ==
=== History ===
The Local Government Act 1972 created a two-tier system of metropolitan counties and districts covering Greater Manchester, Merseyside, South Yorkshire, Tyne and Wear, the West Midlands, and West Yorkshire starting in 1974. Manchester was a district of the Greater Manchester metropolitan county. The Local Government Act 1985 abolished the metropolitan counties, with metropolitan districts taking on most of their powers as metropolitan boroughs. The Greater Manchester Combined Authority was created in 2011 and began electing the mayor of Greater Manchester from 2017, which was given strategic powers covering a region coterminous with the former Greater Manchester metropolitan county.

Since its formation, Manchester City Council has continuously been under Labour control. In the most recent council election in 2022, Labour won 30 of the 32 seats up for election with 65.4% of the vote, with the Liberal Democrats and the Green Party each winning one seat with 12.7% and 11.4% of the vote across the borough respectively. The Conservatives received 8.8% of the vote but did not win any seats.

The seats up for re-election in 2023 were those who were elected in 2019.

=== Changes since the last election ===
Since the 2022 Manchester City Council election councillor Ekua Bayunu, who was elected as a Labour Party candidate in Hulme in 2021, quit the Labour Party and joined the Green Party.

=== Council term ===
Bernard Priest (Lab, Ardwick) resigned as a councillor shortly before the election period began; this leads to a combined election where the candidate with the most votes is elected to a full four-year term, and the candidate with the second most votes fills the remainder of the vacated term 2021–24 term.

The following councillors did not stand for re-election:

Councillor	Party	Ward	Held seat since
Bernard Priest (Note: Standing down mid-term.)	Labour	Ardwick	1998
Luke Raikes	Labour	Baguley	2012
Williams Jeavons	Labour	Deansgate	2018
Greg Stanton (Note: Elected as a Liberal Democrat. Joined the Labour party in 2020.)	Labour	Didsbury West	2019
Sarah Russell	Labour	Northenden	2014
Edward Newman	Labour	Woodhouse Park	2002

== Electoral process ==
The council elects its councillors in thirds, with a third being up for election every year for three years, with no election in the fourth year. Councillors are elected via first-past-the-post voting, with each ward represented by three councillors, with one elected in each election year to serve a four-year term.

All registered electors (British, Irish, Commonwealth and European Union citizens) living in Manchester aged 18 or over will be entitled to vote in the election. People who live at two addresses in different councils, such as university students with different term-time and holiday addresses, are entitled to be registered for and vote in elections in both local authorities. Voting in-person at polling stations will take place from 07:00 to 22:00 on election day, and voters will be able to apply for postal votes or proxy votes in advance of the election.

== Council composition ==
After the 2022 election, the composition of the council was:

↓
92	2	2
Labour	LD	GP

Immediately prior to the election, the composition of the council was:

↓
90	3	2	1
Labour	GP	LD	(Note: vacancy)

Following the election result, the composition of the council became:

↓
88	4	4
Labour	Grn	LD

== Results ==
Summary change in vote share compared to the 2022 election. Change in number of seats compared to the most recent sitting councillor for each ward before the election. The result for the Ardwick ward has been normalised to account for the 2nd vacancy being filled in this election.

2023 Manchester City Council election
Party	This election				Full council			This election		
Party	Candidates	Seats	Net	Seats %	Other	Total	Total %	Votes	Votes %	+/−
Labour	{{{candidates}}}	30/33	3 ▼	90.6	59	88	91.67	62,003	64.60	1.19 ▼
Liberal Democrats	{{{candidates}}}	2/33	2 ▲	6.3	2	4	4.17	11,656	12.15	0.49 ▼
Green	{{{candidates}}}	1/33	1 ▲	3.1	3	4	4.17	13,467	14.03	2.62 ▲
Conservative	{{{candidates}}}	0/33	Steady	0.0	0	0	0.0	7,001	7.29	1.48 ▼
Independent	{{{candidates}}}	0/5	Steady	0.0	0	0	0.0	830	0.86	0.31 ▲
Reform	{{{candidates}}}	0/2	Steady	0.0	0	0	0.0	213	0.22	0.19 ▲
Women's Equality	{{{candidates}}}	0/1	Steady	0.0	0	0	0.0	96	0.10	0.09 ▼
Monster Raving Loony	{{{candidates}}}	0/1	Steady	0.0	0	0	0.0	57	0.06	
Northern Heart	{{{candidates}}}	0/1	Steady	0.0	0	0	0.0	34	0.04	
SDP	{{{candidates}}}	0/1	Steady	0.0	0	0	0.0	26	0.03	0.01 ▲

For the per-ward results, asterisks denote incumbent Councillors seeking re-election. Unless otherwise noted, the councillors seeking re-election were elected in 2019; changes in vote share are therefore compared to 2019.

=== Ancoats and Beswick ===
Ancoats and Beswick
Party	Candidate	Votes	%	±%
Liberal Democrats	Chris Northwood	1,543	49.5	▲38.5
Labour	Majid Dar*	1,208	38.7	▼16.9
Green	Jacob Buffett	250	9.6	▼8.0
Conservative	Sarah Ajiboye	94	3.0	▼5.7
Independent	Peter Clifford	9	0.3	Steady
Majority		335	10.8	
Rejected ballots		15		
Turnout		3,119	25.79	▲4.51
Registered electors		12,093		
Liberal Democrats gain from Labour		Swing	▲27.7	

=== Ardwick ===
Ardwick (2)
Party	Candidate	Votes	%	±%
Labour	Amna Saad Omar Abdullatif*	2,033	72.4	▲1.2
Labour	Abdigafar Muse	1,705	60.7	▼10.5
Green	George Morris	342	12.2	▲2.0
Green	Niall Wright	272	9.7	▼0.5
Conservative	Princetta Nicol	247	8.8	▲1.6
Liberal Democrats	Abigail Bowden	215	7.7	▼2.5
Liberal Democrats	Norman Lewis	184	6.6	▼3.6
Conservative	Haider Raja	133	4.7	▼2.5
Majority				
Rejected ballots		15 (full); 3 (partial)		
Turnout		2,824	23.0	
Registered electors		12,279		
Labour hold		Swing		
Labour hold		Swing		

=== Baguley ===
Baguley
Party	Candidate	Votes	%	±%
Labour Co-op	Phil Brickell	1,509	67.9	15.2 ▲
Conservative	Luke Berry	377	17.0	1.8 ▲
Green	Jake Welsh	214	9.6	0.2 ▼
Liberal Democrats	Phil Manktelow	106	4.8	0.1 ▲
Majority		1132	50.9	14.3 ▲
Rejected ballots		15	0.7	
Turnout		2,221		
Registered electors		11,428		
Labour Co-op hold		Swing	6.7 ▲	

=== Brooklands ===
Brooklands
Party	Candidate	Votes	%	±%
Labour	Glynn Evans* (Note: Incumbent councillor elected in the 2021 Manchester City Council election.)	1,777	66.1	16.8 ▲
Conservative	Stephen McHugh	324	12.1	5.0 ▼
Green	Grace Buczkowska	274	10.2	0.9 ▼
Reform	Dylan Evans	168	6.3	N/A
Liberal Democrats	Mark Saunders	133	4.9	2.6 ▼
Majority		1,453	54.1	21.9 ▲
Rejected ballots		11		
Turnout		2,687		
Registered electors		10,990		
Labour hold		Swing	10.9 ▲	

=== Burnage ===
Burnage
Party	Candidate	Votes	%	±%
Labour	Azra Ali*	2,376	66.1	2.1 ▲
Green	Dick Venes	506	14.1	4.2 ▲
Liberal Democrats	John Cameron	497	13.8	1.8 ▼
Conservative	Md Shahed Hossain	199	5.5	1.4 ▲
Majority				
Rejected ballots		16	0.4	
Turnout				
Registered electors		12,982		
Labour hold		Swing		

=== Charlestown ===
Charlestown
Party	Candidate	Votes	%	±%
Labour	Basil Curley*	1,769	71.4	18.6 ▲
Green	Paul Hodges	332	13.4	7.4 ▲
Conservative	Arbab Khan	278	11.2	4.4 ▲
Liberal Democrats	Mohamed Sabbagh	71	2.9	−0.4 ▼
Majority		1,437	58.0	21.0 ▲
Rejected ballots		26	1.1	0.6 ▲
Turnout		2,476	20.5	−1.8 ▼
Registered electors		12,080		
Labour hold		Swing	5.6 ▲	

=== Cheetham ===
Cheetham
Party	Candidate	Votes	%	±%
Labour	Shazia Butt*	2,605	80.1	−0.9 ▼
Conservative	Iftikhar Ahmed	291	9.0	6.1 ▲
Green	Ben Dundas	202	6.2	1.3 ▲
Liberal Democrats	Roderick Morrison	128	3.9	0.8 ▲
Majority		2,314	71.1	−5.1 ▼
Rejected ballots		25	0.8	-0.1 ▼
Turnout		3,251	24.5	−5.9 ▼
Registered electors		13,263		
Labour hold		Swing	-6.0 ▼	

=== Chorlton ===
Chorlton
Party	Candidate	Votes	%	±%
Labour	Mathew Benham* (Note: Incumbent councillor elected in an October 2021 by-election.)	2,901	67.1	10.1 ▲
Green	Anne Power	850	19.6	−1.4 ▼
Liberal Democrats	Rhona Brown	308	7.1	−5.6 ▼
Conservative	Keith Berry	180	4.2	−0.5 ▼
Independent	Michael Elston	77	1.8	0.5 ▲
Majority		2,051	47.5	11.8 ▲
Rejected ballots		10	0.2	-0.4 ▼
Turnout		4,326	42.0	4.9 ▲
Registered electors		10,296		
Labour hold		Swing	5.8 ▲	

=== Chorlton Park ===
Chorlton Park
Party	Candidate	Votes	%	±%
Labour	Dave Rawson*	3,065	67.1	12.8 ▲
Green	Richard Walton	810	17.7	−4.3 ▼
Liberal Democrats	Amaan Hashmi	434	9.5	−8.6 ▼
Conservative	Andrew Tang	228	5.0	−0.7 ▼
Majority		2,255	49.4	17.3 ▲
Rejected ballots		34	0.7	-0.2 ▼
Turnout		4,571	35.6	−1.5 ▼
Registered electors		12,845		
Labour hold		Swing	8.6 ▲	

=== Clayton and Openshaw ===
Clayton and Openshaw
Party	Candidate	Votes	%	±%
Labour	Sean McHale*	2,008	76.1	31.5 ▲
Conservative	Ramzi Swaray-Kella	204	7.7	4.2 ▲
Liberal Democrats	Maria Turner	202	7.7	4.4 ▲
Green	Billie Nagle	198	7.5	3.9 ▲
Majority		1,804	68.4	68.0 ▲
Rejected ballots		26	1.0	0.3 ▲
Turnout		2,638	20.4	−4.7 ▼
Registered electors		12,943		
Labour hold		Swing	13.7 ▲	

=== Crumpsall ===
Crumpsall
Party	Candidate	Votes	%	±%
Labour	Fiaz Riasat*	2,220	74.4	2.8 ▲
Conservative	Fatima Khan	316	10.6	1.8 ▲
Green	Alison Hawdale	170	5.7	−0.7 ▼
Liberal Democrats	Richard Clayton	163	5.5	1.2 ▲
Women's Equality	Samantha Days	96	3.2	0.8 ▲
Majority		1,904	63.8	0.9 ▲
Rejected ballots		18	0.6	-0.1 ▼
Turnout		2,983	25.6	−4.4 ▼
Registered electors		11,665		
Labour hold		Swing	0.5 ▲	

=== Deansgate ===
Deansgate
Party	Candidate	Votes	%	±%
Labour Co-op	Anthony McCaul	1,050	56.8	22.0 ▲
Green	Chris Perriam	370	20.0	2.4 ▲
Liberal Democrats	Joe Lynch	253	13.7	17.7 ▼
Conservative	Paul Wan	163	8.8	Steady
Majority		680	36.8	
Rejected ballots		14		
Turnout		1,850	21.16	
Registered electors		8,744		
Labour Co-op hold		Swing		

=== Didsbury East ===
Didsbury East
Party	Candidate	Votes	%	±%
Labour Co-op	James Wilson*	2,450	52.1	▲10.2
Liberal Democrats	Bryn Coombe	1,560	33.2	▼7.4
Green	Anne Guy	484	10.3	▼0.3
Conservative	Anjenarra Huque	160	3.4	▼2.8
Independent	Paula Matsikidze	48	1	▲1
Majority		890	18.9	▲17.6
Rejected ballots		21		
Turnout		4,702	42.36	▲0.65
Registered electors		11,149		
Labour Co-op hold		Swing		

=== Didsbury West ===
Didsbury West
Party	Candidate	Votes	%	±%
Liberal Democrats	Richard Kilpatrick	2,260	44.3	5.9 ▼
Labour	Leslie Bell	2,047	40.1	6.3 ▲
Green	James Young	592	11.6	1.8 ▲
Conservative	Martin Cartwright	153	3.0	0.9 ▼
SDP	Wendy Andrew	26	0.5	N/A
Majority		213	4.2	12.2 ▼
Rejected ballots		23		
Turnout		5,101		
Registered electors		11,888		
Liberal Democrats hold		Swing	6.1 ▼	

Previous councillor Greg Stanton was elected for the Liberal Democrats in 2019 but defected to Labour; for the purpose of comparison to the 2019 figures this ward is a Lib Dem hold.

=== Fallowfield ===
Fallowfield
Party	Candidate	Votes	%	±%
Labour	Jade Doswell*	1,290	73.8	▲10.4
Green	Charlie O'Brian	216	12.4	▼5.1
Conservative	Sabneena Hossain	134	7.7	▲2.6
Liberal Democrats	Lynne Williams	108	6.2	▼2.4
Majority		1,074	61.4	▲18.6
Rejected ballots				
Turnout		1,748	18.35	▲1.8
Registered electors		9,596		
Labour hold		Swing		

=== Gorton and Abbey Hey ===
Gorton and Abbey Hey
Party	Candidate	Votes	%	±%
Labour	Afia Kamal*	1,906	64.9	▲17.6
Liberal Democrats	Jackie Pearcey	531	18.1	▼8.3
Green	Natasha Turner	274	9.3	▲2.6
Conservative	Mokammel Alam	228	7.8	▲2.3
Majority		1,375	46.8	▲25.9
Rejected ballots				
Turnout		2,939	22.08	▼2.1
Registered electors		13,481		
Labour hold		Swing		

=== Harpurhey ===
Harpurhey
Party	Candidate	Votes	%	±%
Labour	Pat Karney*	1,715	72.1	▲9.0
Conservative	Gareth Brown	307	12.9	▲3.7
Green	Sam Cook	216	9.1	▲0.1
Liberal Democrats	Celia Craske	140	5.9	▲1.6
Majority		1,408	59.2	▲9.4
Rejected ballots				
Turnout		2,378	18.77	▼0.47
Registered electors		12,813		
Labour hold		Swing		

=== Higher Blackley ===
Higher Blackley
Party	Candidate	Votes	%	±%
Labour	Paula Sadler*	1,498	66.0	9.6 ▲
Conservative	Colin Jones	250	11.0	3.2▲
Independent	Martin Power	212	9.3	N/A
Liberal Democrats	Peter Matthews	156	6.9	2.5▼
Green	Vicky Matthews	152	6.7	2.1▼
Majority		1,248		
Rejected ballots		13		
Turnout		2,268	20.37	
Registered electors		11,210		
Labour hold		Swing		

=== Hulme ===
Hulme
Party	Candidate	Votes	%	±%
Labour Co-op	Annette Wright*	1,866	70.6	8.5▲
Green	Chris Ogden	501	19.0	6.2▼
Conservative	Samuel Stephenson	158	6.0	0.6▼
Liberal Democrats	Bernadette Ryan	117	4.4	2.2▼
Majority		1,365	51.7	
Rejected ballots		18		
Turnout		2,660	21.96	
Registered electors		12,115		
Labour Co-op hold		Swing		

=== Levenshulme ===
Levenshulme
Party	Candidate	Votes	%	±%
Labour	Basat Sheikh*	2,425	59.5	4.7 ▼
Green	Amanda Gardner	762	18.7	0.2 ▲
Independent	Jeremy Hoad	484	11.9	N/A
Liberal Democrats	John Bridges	265	6.5	6.8 ▼
Conservative	Patience Assam	108	2.6	1.8 ▼
Northern Heart	Alim Haider	34	0.8	N/A
Majority		1,663		
Rejected ballots		24		
Turnout		4,078	30.9	
Registered electors		13,284		
Labour hold		Swing		

=== Longsight ===
Longsight
Party	Candidate	Votes	%	±%
Labour	Suzanne Richards*	2,663	83.1	6.6▲
Conservative	Shahana Choudhury	259	8.1	2.4▼
Liberal Democrats	Kobe Bibbon	148	4.6	1.9▼
Green	Bernard Ekbery	135	4.2	1.6▼
Majority		2,404		
Rejected ballots		20		
Turnout			24.22%	
Registered electors		13,321		
Labour hold		Swing		

=== Miles Platting and Newton Heath ===
Miles Platting and Newton Heath
Party	Candidate	Votes	%	±%
Labour	John Flanagan*	1,872	74.1	13.8▲
Conservative	Derek Brocklehurst	247	9.8	5.0▲
Green	Jonathon Mbay Kazemb	238	9.4	1.4▲
Liberal Democrats	Charles Turner	168	6.7	2.9▲
Majority		1,625		
Rejected ballots		21		
Turnout			19.39	
Registered electors		13,138		
Labour hold		Swing		

=== Moss Side ===
Moss Side
Party	Candidate	Votes	%	±%
Labour	Mahadi Sharif Mahamed*	2,300	68.9	10.0 ▼
Green	Thirza Amina Asanga-Rae	707	21.2	10.4 ▲
Conservative	Michael Ciotkowski	179	5.4	1.9 ▲
Liberal Democrats	Robin Grayson	128	3.8	2.1 ▼
Majority		1,593	41.7	26.4 ▼
Rejected ballots		24	0.7	
Turnout		3,338	23.97	1.0 ▼
Registered electors		13,926		
Labour hold		Swing	10.2 ▼	

=== Moston ===
Moston
Party	Candidate	Votes	%	±%
Labour	Yasmine Dar*	1,859	64.6	18.1▲
Conservative	Popoola Alabi	484	16.8	6.7▲
Green	Diane Kosandiak	305	10.6	4.7▲
Liberal Democrats	Elizabeth Bain	228	7.9	4.1▲
Majority		1,375		
Rejected ballots		18		
Turnout			22.27	
Registered electors		12,996		
Labour hold		Swing		

=== Northenden ===
Northenden
Party	Candidate	Votes	%	±%
Labour	Richard Fletcher	1,591	63.5	6.6▲
Green	Sylvia Buchan	389	15.5	Steady
Conservative	Jamie Hoyle	310	12.4	1.5▼
Liberal Democrats	Chris Rogers	158	6.3	2.9▼
Monster Raving Loony	Sir Oink A-Lot	57	2.3	2.3▼
Majority		1,202		
Rejected ballots		10		
Turnout		2,515	23.01	
Registered electors		10,932		
Labour hold		Swing		

=== Old Moat ===
Old Moat
Party	Candidate	Votes	%	±%
Labour	Garry Bridges*	2,096	74.0	11.1▲
Green	Laura Bannister	436	15.4	1.4▼
Liberal Democrats	Jon Martin	192	6.8	7.0▼
Conservative	Ugo Nzeribe	109	3.8	1.4▼
Majority		1,660		
Rejected ballots		12		
Turnout			25.82	
Registered electors		11,017		
Labour hold		Swing		

=== Piccadilly ===
Piccadilly
Party	Candidate	Votes	%	±%
Labour	Samuel Wheeler*	958	48.7	6.1 ▲
Green	Scott Robinson	725	36.9	12.9 ▲
Liberal Democrats	Luke Allan	127	6.5	19.0 ▼
Conservative	Malik Haris	100	5.1	1.9 ▼
Reform	Jeffrey Wong	45	2.3	N/A
Majority		233	11.8	5.3 ▼
Rejected ballots		11	0.6	
Turnout		1966		
Registered electors		8,775		
Labour hold		Swing	3.4 ▼	

=== Rusholme ===
Rusholme
Party	Candidate	Votes	%	±%
Labour	Ahmed Ali*	2,371	80.1	5.2▲
Green	Dennis Pirdzuns	249	8.4	4.3 ▼
Conservative	Jason McLeod	204	6.9	2.0▲
Liberal Democrats	Greg Sammons	135	4.6	2.0▼
Majority		2,122		
Rejected ballots		22		
Turnout		2,981	25.42	
Registered electors		11,729		
Labour hold		Swing		

=== Sharston ===
Sharston
Party	Candidate	Votes	%	±%
Labour	Tim Whiston*	1,581	69.3	12.6 ▲
Conservative	Daniel Johnson	349	15.4	7.0 ▲
Green	Brian Candeland	198	8.7	2.2 ▼
Liberal Democrats	Ellin Saunders	123	5.4	0.5 ▼
Majority		1,232		
Rejected ballots		13		
Turnout		2,264	19.67	
Registered electors		11,510		
Labour hold		Swing		

=== Whalley Range ===
Whalley Range
Party	Candidate	Votes	%	±%
Labour	Angeliki Stogia*	2,379	69.0	0.1 ▼
Green	Laura Potter	765	22.2	0.9 ▲
Conservative	Praveen Tomar	173	5.0	1.6 ▲
Liberal Democrats	Seb Bate	132	3.8	1.8 ▼
Majority		1,614		
Rejected ballots		24		
Turnout			30.4	
Registered electors		11,444		
Labour hold		Swing		

=== Withington ===
Withington
Party	Candidate	Votes	%	±%
Labour	Becky Chambers*	1,673	54.4	9.8 ▲
Liberal Democrats	April Preston	909	29.5	10.3 ▼
Green	Sam Easterby-Smith	388	12.6	3.2 ▲
Conservative	Benjamin Harvey Spencer	108	3.5	0.8 ▲
Majority		764		
Rejected ballots		15		
Turnout		3,078	29.66	
Registered electors		10,377		
Labour hold		Swing		

=== Woodhouse Park ===
Woodhouse Park
Party	Candidate	Votes	%	±%
Green	Anastasia Wiest	1,252	49.3	14.8 ▲
Labour	Dave Marsh	1,106	43.6	7.8 ▼
Conservative	Eric Houghton	137	5.4	3.3 ▼
Liberal Democrats	Anna Hablak	34	1.3	2.2 ▼
Majority		146	5.8	
Rejected ballots		8	0.3	
Turnout		2,537	22.41	
Registered electors		11,329		
Green gain from Labour		Swing	15.2 ▲	

== Changes since this election ==
=== Brooklands by-election ===
On 26 July 2023 Julia Baker Smith resigned her seat in Brooklands following rumours that she was living in on the Isle of Wight, 200 miles (320 km) away from her ward. A by-election was held on 7 September 2023.

Brooklands by-election
Party	Candidate	Votes	%	±%
Labour	Dave Marsh	923	61.5	10.8 ▲
Conservative	Norman Decent	189	12.6	9.1 ▼
Green	Grace Buczkowska	178	11.9	2.4 ▲
Reform	Dylan Evans	133	8.9	New
Liberal Democrats	Euan Stewart	77	5.1	2.1 ▲
Majority		734	48.9	
Turnout			13.6	
Labour hold		Swing		

=== Resignations and defections ===
In October 2023 Amna Abdullatif (Ardwick) resigned from the Labour Party in the wake of the Labour leadership's stance on the Israeli invasion of Gaza, sitting as an independent councillor.
