= 2022 Manchester City Council election =

2022 local election in Manchester

- 5 May 2022

32 of 96 seats on Manchester City Council 49 seats needed for a majority
- Turnout: 95,111 (24.98%)
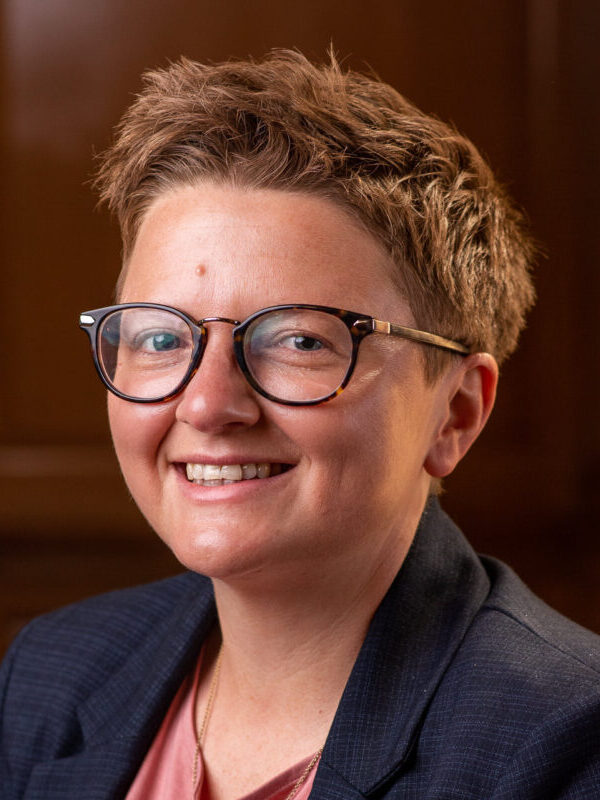

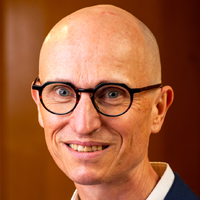
	First party	Second party	Third party
Leader	Bev Craig	John Leech	Rob Nunney
Party	Labour	Liberal Democrats	Green
Last election	33 (65.43%)	0 (10.44%)	1 (11.47%)
Seats won	30	1	1
Seat change	▼1	Steady	▲1
Popular vote	62,578	12,019	10,854
Percentage	65.79%	12.64%	11.41%
Swing	▼0.92%	▲2.20%	▼0.06%
council control before election
Bev Craig
Labour
Subsequent council control
Bev Craig
Labour

The 2022 Manchester City Council election took place on 5 May 2022. One third of councillors on Manchester City Council were elected. This election was a part of the other local elections across the United Kingdom.

In the previous council election in 2021, the Labour Party maintained its longstanding control of the council, holding 94 of the council's 96 seats. The Green Party held one of the others, and the Liberal Democrats held the other.

== Background ==
=== History ===
The Local Government Act 1972 created a two-tier system of metropolitan counties and districts covering Greater Manchester, Merseyside, South Yorkshire, Tyne and Wear, the West Midlands, and West Yorkshire starting in 1974. Manchester was a district of the Greater Manchester metropolitan county. The Local Government Act 1985 abolished the metropolitan counties, with metropolitan districts taking on most of their powers as metropolitan boroughs. The Greater Manchester Combined Authority was created in 2011 and began electing the mayor of Greater Manchester from 2017, which was given strategic powers covering a region coterminous with the former Greater Manchester metropolitan county.

Since its formation, Manchester City Council has continuously been under Labour control. In the most recent council election in 2021, Labour won 31 of the 32 seats up for election with 65.4% of the vote, and the Green Party won the other seat with 11.5% of the vote across the borough. The Conservatives received 10.8% of the vote and the Liberal Democrats won 10.4% of the vote but neither party won any seats.

The Local Government Boundary Commission for England produced new boundaries for Manchester ahead of the 2018 election, meaning that the 2018 elections were all-out, with all councillors being elected before returning to electing by thirds. Candidates up for re-election in 2022 are those who came first in each ward in 2018.

=== Council term ===
On 7 September 2021 Richard Leese announced his retirement after 38 years as a councillor and 25 years as the council leader. He was succeeded as leader on 1 December 2021 by Bev Craig and resigned from the council on 4 January 2022. Two by-elections have been called since the 2021 election: One in Chorlton, held on 14 October 2021, following the resignation of Matt Strong, which was won by Mathew Benham for Labour, and one in Ancoats & Beswick, held on 3 February 2022, following the resignation of Marcia Hutchinson, which was won by Alan Good for the Liberal Democrats.

The following councillors are not standing for re-election:

Councillor	Party	Ward	Held seat since
Rosa Battle	Labour	Ancoats and Beswick	2007 (Note: Ancoats & Beswick was created in the 2018 boundary review; Battle had been the councillor for the abolished Bradford ward which forms part of Ancoats & Beswick.)
Ben Clay	Labour	Burnage	2018
Richard Leese (Note: Resigned 4 January 2022, seat subsequently vacant.)	Labour	Crumpsall	1984
John Farrell	Labour	Higher Blackley	2015
Sameem Ali	Labour	Moss Side	2007
Mary Monaghan	Labour	Northenden	2016
Rebecca Moore	Labour	Withington	2014

== Electoral process ==
The council elects its councillors in thirds, with a third being up for election every year for three years, with no election in the fourth year. Councillors are elected via first-past-the-post voting, with each ward represented by three councillors, with one elected in each election year to serve a four-year term.

All registered electors (British, Irish, Commonwealth and European Union citizens) living in Manchester aged 18 or over will be entitled to vote in the election. People who live at two addresses in different councils, such as university students with different term-time and holiday addresses, are entitled to be registered for and vote in elections in both local authorities. Voting in-person at polling stations will take place from 07:00 to 22:00 on election day, and voters will be able to apply for postal votes or proxy votes in advance of the election.

== Council composition ==
After the 2021 election, the composition of the council was:

↓
94	1	1
Labour	LD	GP

Immediately prior to the election, the composition of the council was:

↓
92	2	1	1
Labour	LD	GP	^{[a]}

^{a} Vacant seat previously held by Richard Leese

After the election, the composition of the council is:

↓
92	2	2
Labour	LD	GP

== Results ==
Summary change in vote share compared to the 2021 election. Change in number of seats compared to the most recent sitting councillor for each ward prior to the election.

2022 Manchester City Council election
Party	This election				Full council			This election		
Party	Candidates	Seats	Net	Seats %	Other	Total	Total %	Votes	Votes %	+/−
Labour	{{{candidates}}}	30/32	1 ▼	93.8	62	92	95.8	62,578	65.79	0.36 ▲
Liberal Democrats	{{{candidates}}}	1/32	Steady	3.1	1	2	2.1	12,019	12.64	2.20 ▲
Green	{{{candidates}}}	1/31	1 ▲	3.1	1	2	2.1	10,854	11.41	0.06 ▼
Conservative	{{{candidates}}}	0/32	Steady	0.0	0	0	0.0	8,340	8.77	2.06 ▼
Independent	{{{candidates}}}	0/2	Steady	0.0	0	0	0.0	522	0.55	0.16 ▼
Women's Equality	{{{candidates}}}	0/2	Steady	0.0	0	0	0.0	176	0.19	0.05 ▼
Reform	{{{candidates}}}	0/1	Steady	0.0	0	0	0.0	30	0.03	0.32 ▼
SDP	{{{candidates}}}	0/1	Steady	0.0	0	0	0.0	22	0.02	0.01 ▼

For the per-ward results, asterisks denote incumbent Councillors seeking re-election. Unless otherwise noted, the councillors seeking re-election were elected in 2018; changes in vote share are compared to 2018.

=== Ancoats and Beswick ===
Ancoats and Beswick
Party	Candidate	Votes	%	±%
Labour	Irene Robinson	1,332	46.4	25.6 ▼
Liberal Democrats	Chris Northwood	1,234	43.0	31.6 ▲
Green	Chris Perriam	190	6.6	10.2 ▼
Conservative	Steven Kelly	99	3.4	8.9 ▼
Majority		98	3.4	
Rejected ballots		16	0.6	
Turnout		2,871	24.1	3.1 ▲
Registered electors		11,925		
Labour hold		Swing	28.6 ▼	

=== Ardwick ===
Ardwick
Party	Candidate	Votes	%	±%
Labour	Tarjuah Hewitson*	1,936	78.8	6.8 ▲
Conservative	Callum Wood	201	8.2	0.3 ▼
Green	George Morris	199	8.1	4.2 ▼
Liberal Democrats	Melvin Sowah	104	4.2	1.9 ▼
Majority		1,735	71.1	
Rejected ballots		18		
Turnout		2,440	19.0	1.3 ▼
Registered electors		12,946		
Labour hold		Swing	3.6 ▲	

=== Baguley ===
Baguley
Party	Candidate	Votes	%	±%
Labour Co-op	Paul Andrews*	1,489	65.6	2.4 ▼
Conservative	Keith Berry	438	19.2	1.4 ▼
Green	Jake Welsh	198	8.7	1.6 ▼
Liberal Democrats	Seb Bate	130	5.7	0.2 ▼
Majority		1,051	46.4	
Rejected ballots		16		
Turnout		2,255	19.9	0.3 ▲
Registered electors		11,400		
Labour Co-op hold		Swing	0.5 ▼	

=== Brooklands ===
Brooklands
Party	Candidate	Votes	%	±%
Labour	Susan Cooley*	1,652	60.0	0.3 ▲
Conservative	Norman Decent	631	22.9	5.1 ▼
Green	Grace Buczkowska	310	11.3	0.2 ▲
Liberal Democrats	Ellin Sunders	152	5.5	0.1 ▲
Majority		1,021	37.1	
Rejected ballots		11		
Turnout		2,745	25.2	0.1 ▲
Registered electors		10,951		
Labour hold		Swing	2.7 ▲	

=== Burnage ===
Burnage
Party	Candidate	Votes	%	±%
Labour	Murtaza Iqbal	2,359	66.8	2.7 ▼
Green	Dick Venes	542	15.4	4.9 ▲
Liberal Democrats	Bryn Coombe	340	9.6	8.2 ▼
Conservative	Md Hossain	265	7.5	0.6 ▲
Majority		1,817	51.8	
Rejected ballots		25		
Turnout		3,506	27.4	5.2 ▼
Registered electors		12,908		
Labour hold		Swing	3.9 ▼	

=== Charlestown ===
Charlestown
Party	Candidate	Votes	%	±%
Labour	Veronica Kirkpatrick*	1,749	69.9	5.1 ▲
Conservative	Mokammel Alam	371	14.8	1.0 ▼
Green	Paul Hodges	272	10.9	1.0 ▲
Liberal Democrats	Melanie Ncube	86	3.4	2.9 ▼
Majority		1,378	55.1	
Rejected ballots		23		
Turnout		2,478	20.8	2.3 ▼
Registered electors		12,023		
Labour hold		Swing	3.1 ▲	

=== Cheetham ===
Cheetham
Party	Candidate	Votes	%	±%
Labour	Naeem Hassan*	2,625	82.7	7.7 ▲
Green	Ben Dundas	207	6.5	0.4 ▼
Conservative	Paul Wan	206	6.5	1.0 ▲
Liberal Democrats	Roddy Morrison	113	3.6	1.5 ▼
Majority		2,418	76.2	
Rejected ballots		22		
Turnout		3,151	24.0	7.7 ▼
Registered electors		13,201		
Labour hold		Swing	4.1 ▲	

=== Chorlton ===
Chorlton
Party	Candidate	Votes	%	±%
Labour	John Hacking*	2,817	65.5	1.4 ▲
Green	Anne Power	726	16.9	3.7 ▲
Liberal Democrats	Rosie Hughes	462	10.7	1.7 ▼
Conservative	Matthew Roden	167	3.9	2.2 ▼
Women's Equality	Jo Heathcote	119	2.8	6.6 ▼
Majority		2,091	48.6	
Rejected ballots		13		
Turnout		4,291	41.2	5.1 ▼
Registered electors		10,444		
Labour hold		Swing	1.2 ▼	

=== Chorlton Park ===
Chorlton Park
Party	Candidate	Votes	%	±%
Labour Co-op	Joanna Midgley*	3,450	72.5	9.0 ▲
Green	Richard Walton	664	14.0	1.5 ▲
Liberal Democrats	Amaan Hashmi	349	7.3	18.1 ▼
Conservative	Andrew Tang	269	5.6	0.8 ▲
Majority		2,786	58.5	
Rejected ballots		29		
Turnout		4,732	36.7	4.6 ▼
Registered electors		12,962		
Labour Co-op hold		Swing	3.8 ▲	

=== Clayton and Openshaw ===
Note: The incumbent councillor, Thomas Robinson, was elected in May 2021.

Clayton and Openshaw
Party	Candidate	Votes	%	±%
Labour	Thomas Robinson*	1,892	71.6	0.7 ▲
Green	Amanda Evans	293	11.1	3.7 ▲
Conservative	Ramzi Swaray-Kella	291	11.0	3.7 ▲
Liberal Democrats	Maria Turner	148	5.6	3.8 ▼
Majority		1,599	60.5	
Rejected ballots		17		
Turnout		2,624	20.8	4.1 ▼
Registered electors		12,680		
Labour hold		Swing	1.5 ▼	

=== Crumpsall ===
Crumpsall
Party	Candidate	Votes	%	±%
Labour	Mohammad Jawad Amin	2,387	72.9	1.0 ▼
Conservative	Iftikhar Butt Ahmed	497	15.2	4.6 ▲
Green	Alison Hawdale	167	5.1	2.8 ▼
Liberal Democrats	Mike McKinstry	152	4.6	0.9 ▼
Women's Equality	Sam Days	57	1.7	n/a
Majority		1,890	57.7	
Rejected ballots		13		
Turnout		3,260	28.5	5.5 ▼
Registered electors		11,493		
Labour hold		Swing	2.8 ▼	

=== Deansgate ===
Deansgate
Party	Candidate	Votes	%	±%
Labour	Joan Davies*	1,033	59.9	5.9 ▲
Liberal Democrats	John Bridges	292	16.9	8.3 ▼
Green	Anastasia Wiest	231	13.4	2.3 ▲
Conservative	Jamie Hoyle	139	8.1	1.0 ▲
Reform	Nick Buckley	30	1.7	0.0
Majority		741	43.0	14.3 ▲
Rejected ballots		8		
Turnout		1,725	20.1	0.7 ▲
Registered electors		8,643		
Labour hold		Swing	7.1 ▲	

=== Didsbury East ===
Didsbury East
Party	Candidate	Votes	%	±%
Labour Co-op	Andrew Simcock*	2,714	54.6	2.7 ▲
Liberal Democrats	John Cameron	1,704	34.3	0.9 ▼
Green	Paula Watson	331	6.7	4.0 ▼
Conservative	Anjenarra Huque	196	4.0	3.5 ▼
Majority		1,010	20.3	
Rejected ballots		22		
Turnout		4,945	44.6	1.0 ▲
Registered electors		11,134		
Labour Co-op hold		Swing	1.8 ▲	

=== Didsbury West ===
Didsbury West
Party	Candidate	Votes	%	±%
Liberal Democrats	John Leech*	2,760	53.8	1.4 ▼
Labour	Luke Savage	1,863	36.3	5.2 ▼
Green	Sally Hawkins	342	6.7	6.1 ▼
Conservative	Luke Bourke Costello	123	2.4	3.6 ▼
SDP	Wendy Andrew	22	0.4	n/a
Majority		897	17.5	
Rejected ballots		25		
Turnout		5,135	42.6	4.9 ▼
Registered electors		12,058		
Liberal Democrats hold		Swing	1.9 ▲	

=== Fallowfield ===
Note: The incumbent councillor, Ali Ilyas, was elected in May 2019

Fallowfield
Party	Candidate	Votes	%	±%
Labour	Ali Ilyas*	1,157	71.0	3.1 ▼
Green	Hannah Charter	245	15.0	1.5 ▼
Conservative	Sabreena Hossain	116	7.1	0.4 ▲
Liberal Democrats	Paul Jones	98	6.0	3.7 ▼
Majority		912	56.0	
Rejected ballots		13		
Turnout		1,616	15.2	1.8 ▼
Registered electors		10,706		
Labour hold		Swing	0.8 ▼	

=== Gorton and Abbey Hey ===
Gorton and Abbey Hey
Party	Candidate	Votes	%	±%
Labour Co-op	Louis Hughes*	1,996	68.9	9.0 ▲
Liberal Democrats	Jackie Pearcey	393	13.6	10.1 ▼
Conservative	Ugo Nzeribe	279	9.6	1.5 ▼
Green	Natasha Turner	207	7.1	0.7 ▼
Majority		1,603	55.3	
Rejected ballots		24		
Turnout		2,875	21.8	2.2 ▼
Registered electors		13,310		
Labour Co-op hold		Swing	9.6 ▲	

=== Harpurhey ===
Harpurhey
Party	Candidate	Votes	%	±%
Labour	Sandra Collins*	1,667	74.0	2.5 ▲
Conservative	Gareth Brown	291	12.9	3.5 ▼
Green	Billie Nagle	181	8.0	3.5 ▼
Liberal Democrats	Celia Craske	95	4.2	n/a
Majority		1,376	61.1	
Rejected ballots		20		
Turnout		2,254	17.7	2.4 ▼
Registered electors		12,707		
Labour hold		Swing	3.0 ▲	

=== Higher Blackley ===
Higher Blackley
Party	Candidate	Votes	%	±%
Labour	Olusegun Ogunbambo	1,524	64.4	6.2 ▼
Conservative	Colin Jones	534	22.6	5.1 ▲
Green	Vicky Matthews	158	6.7	4.1 ▼
Liberal Democrats	Peter Matthews	133	5.6	5.1 ▼
Majority		990	41.8	
Rejected ballots		19		
Turnout		2,368	21.1	1.6 ▼
Registered electors		11,218		
Labour hold		Swing	5.7 ▼	

=== Hulme ===
Hulme
Party	Candidate	Votes	%	±%
Labour	Lee-Ann Igbon*	1,902	71.8	0.3 ▼
Green	Chris Ogden	401	15.1	4.5 ▼
Liberal Democrats	Gary McKenna	173	6.5	0.3 ▼
Conservative	William Watermeyer	151	5.7	1.2 ▼
Majority		1,501	56.7	
Rejected ballots		23		
Turnout		2,650	20.1	2.2 ▼
Registered electors		13,192		
Labour hold		Swing	2.1 ▲	

=== Levenshulme ===
Levenshulme
Party	Candidate	Votes	%	±%
Labour	Dzidra Noor*	2,543	64.0	7.9 ▼
Green	Brian Candeland	525	13.2	5.3 ▼
Independent	Jeremy Hoad	492	12.4	n/a
Liberal Democrats	Greg Sammons	217	5.5	7.7 ▼
Conservative	Jason McLeod	175	4.4	Steady
Majority		2,018	50.8	
Rejected ballots		23		
Turnout		3,975	30.1	3.9 ▼
Registered electors		13,206		
Labour hold		Swing	1.3 ▼	

=== Longsight ===
Longsight
Party	Candidate	Votes	%	±%
Labour	Abid Chohan*	2,527	83.2	4.2 ▲
Conservative	Shahana Choudhury	194	6.4	0.9 ▲
Green	Bernard Ekbery	162	5.3	0.3 ▼
Liberal Democrats	Kobe Bibbon	137	4.5	0.1 ▲
Majority		2,333	76.8	
Rejected ballots		19		
Turnout		3,039	23.2	5.8 ▼
Registered electors		13,105		
Labour hold		Swing	1.7 ▲	

=== Miles Platting and Newton Heath ===
Miles Platting and Newton Heath
Party	Candidate	Votes	%	±%
Labour	Carmine Grimshaw*	1,820	72.8	2.3 ▲
Conservative	Derek Brocklehurst	302	12.1	2.2 ▲
Green	Tamara Huber	243	9.7	0.1 ▲
Liberal Democrats	Charles Turner	117	4.7	n/a
Majority		1,518	60.7	
Rejected ballots		18		
Turnout		2,500	19.1	
Registered electors		13,069		
Labour hold		Swing	0.1 ▲	

=== Moss Side ===
Moss Side
Party	Candidate	Votes	%	±%
Labour	Erinma Bell	2,343	82.0	10.1 ▲
Green	Albie Mayo	224	7.8	2.7 ▼
Conservative	Samuel Stephhenson	192	6.7	2.1 ▲
Liberal Democrats	Phil White	79	2.8	2.5 ▼
Majority		2,119	74.2	
Rejected ballots		19		
Turnout		2,857	20.5	7.4 ▼
Registered electors		13,942		
Labour hold		Swing	6.4 ▲	

=== Moston ===
Moston
Party	Candidate	Votes	%	±%
Labour	Paula Appleby*	2,049	68.9	3.2 ▼
Conservative	Popoola Alabi	540	18.2	3.3 ▼
Green	Dianne Kosandiak	228	7.7	4.4 ▼
Liberal Democrats	Martha O'Donoghue	113	3.8	n/a
Independent	Hugo Wils	30	1.0	n/a
Majority		1,509	50.7	
Rejected ballots		16		
Turnout		2,976	22.8	3.2 ▼
Registered electors		13,049		
Labour hold		Swing	0.1 ▲	

=== Northenden ===
Northenden
Party	Candidate	Votes	%	±%
Labour	Angela Moran	1,749	65.7	0.5 ▼
Conservative	Daniel Bell	422	15.9	2.2 ▼
Green	Sylvia Buchan	340	12.8	2.1 ▼
Liberal Democrats	Mark Saunders	140	5.3	1.3 ▼
Majority		1,327	49.8	
Rejected ballots		12		
Turnout		2,663	24.3	0.8 ▼
Registered electors		10,977		
Labour hold		Swing	0.9 ▲	

=== Old Moat ===
Old Moat
Party	Candidate	Votes	%	±%
Labour	Suzannah Reeves*	2,020	71.8	0.3 ▲
Green	Stace Wright	343	12.2	4.4 ▼
Liberal Democrats	Jon Martin	272	9.7	4.3 ▼
Conservative	Cillian Neil	162	5.8	0.5 ▼
Majority		1,677	59.6	
Rejected ballots		15		
Turnout		2,812	24.2	3.6 ▼
Registered electors		11,623		
Labour hold		Swing	2.4 ▲	

=== Piccadilly ===
Piccadilly
Party	Candidate	Votes	%	±%
Labour	Adele Douglas*	1,057	59.1	1.9 ▼
Green	Scott Robinson	375	21.0	3.3 ▼
Liberal Democrats	Allison Harrison	208	11.6	11.4 ▼
Conservative	Alexander Bramham	139	7.8	1.4 ▼
Majority		682	38.1	
Rejected ballots		9		
Turnout		1,788	21.5	1.4 ▲
Registered electors		8,329		
Labour hold		Swing	0.7 ▲	

Conservative candidate Alexander Bramham was suspended from the Conservative Party on 25 April after sending tweets linking trans and black people with Nazis. As he was validly nominated as a Conservative candidate at the close of the nomination period, he appeared as "The Conservative Party Candidate" on the ballot paper.

=== Rusholme ===
Rusholme
Party	Candidate	Votes	%	±%
Labour	Rabnawaz Akbar*	2,408	86.9	12.6 ▲
Liberal Democrats	Mohammed Sabbagh	171	6.2	1.9 ▼
Conservative	Usman Arshed	169	6.1	1.3 ▲
Majority		2,237		
Rejected ballots		24		
Turnout		2,772	22.3	4.9 ▼
Registered electors		12,413		
Labour hold		Swing	7.3 ▲	

=== Sharston ===
Sharston
Party	Candidate	Votes	%	±%
Labour	Tommy Judge*	1,525	68.5	0.4 ▲
Conservative	Bheem Pulla	363	16.3	0.9 ▼
Green	Catherine Longson	181	8.1	1.4 ▼
Liberal Democrats	Robin Grayson	148	6.7	0.5 ▲
Majority		1,162	52.2	
Rejected ballots		10		
Turnout		2,227	19.3	0.5 ▼
Registered electors		11,533		
Labour hold		Swing	0.7 ▲	

=== Whalley Range ===
Whalley Range
Party	Candidate	Votes	%	±%
Labour	Aftab Razaq*	2,318	68.0	7.6 ▲
Green	Laura Potter	721	21.1	13.3 ▼
Liberal Democrats	Andrew McGuinness	174	5.1	1.9 ▲
Conservative	Muhammad Shahid	173	5.1	1.7 ▲
Majority		1,597	46.9	
Rejected ballots		24		
Turnout		3,410	29.9	4.3 ▲
Registered electors		11,424		
Labour hold		Swing	10.5 ▲	

=== Withington ===
Withington
Party	Candidate	Votes	%	±%
Labour	Angela Gartside	1,525	47.5	11.4 ▼
Liberal Democrats	April Preston	1,279	39.8	6.8 ▲
Green	Sam Easterby-Smith	303	9.4	6.0 ▼
Conservative	Michael Barnes	87	2.7	1.9 ▼
Majority		246	7.7	
Rejected ballots		17		
Turnout		3,211	29.4	1.1 ▼
Registered electors		10,931		
Labour hold		Swing	9.1 ▼	

=== Woodhouse Park ===
Woodhouse Park
Party	Candidate	Votes	%	±%
Green	Astrid Johnson	1,345	49.7	42.4 ▲
Labour	Sarah Judge*	1,150	42.5	24.8 ▼
Conservative	Stephen McHugh	160	5.9	11.7 ▼
Liberal Democrats	Anna Hablak	46	1.7	3.3 ▼
Majority		195	7.2	
Rejected ballots		7	0.26	
Turnout		2,708	24.1	6.1 ▲
Registered electors		11,233		
Green gain from Labour		Swing	33.6 ▲	

== Changes since this election ==
On 1 July 2022 Ekua Bayunu (Hulme, elected 2021) quit the Labour Party and joined the Green Party.
