= Gorton and Abbey Hey =

- Electoral ward
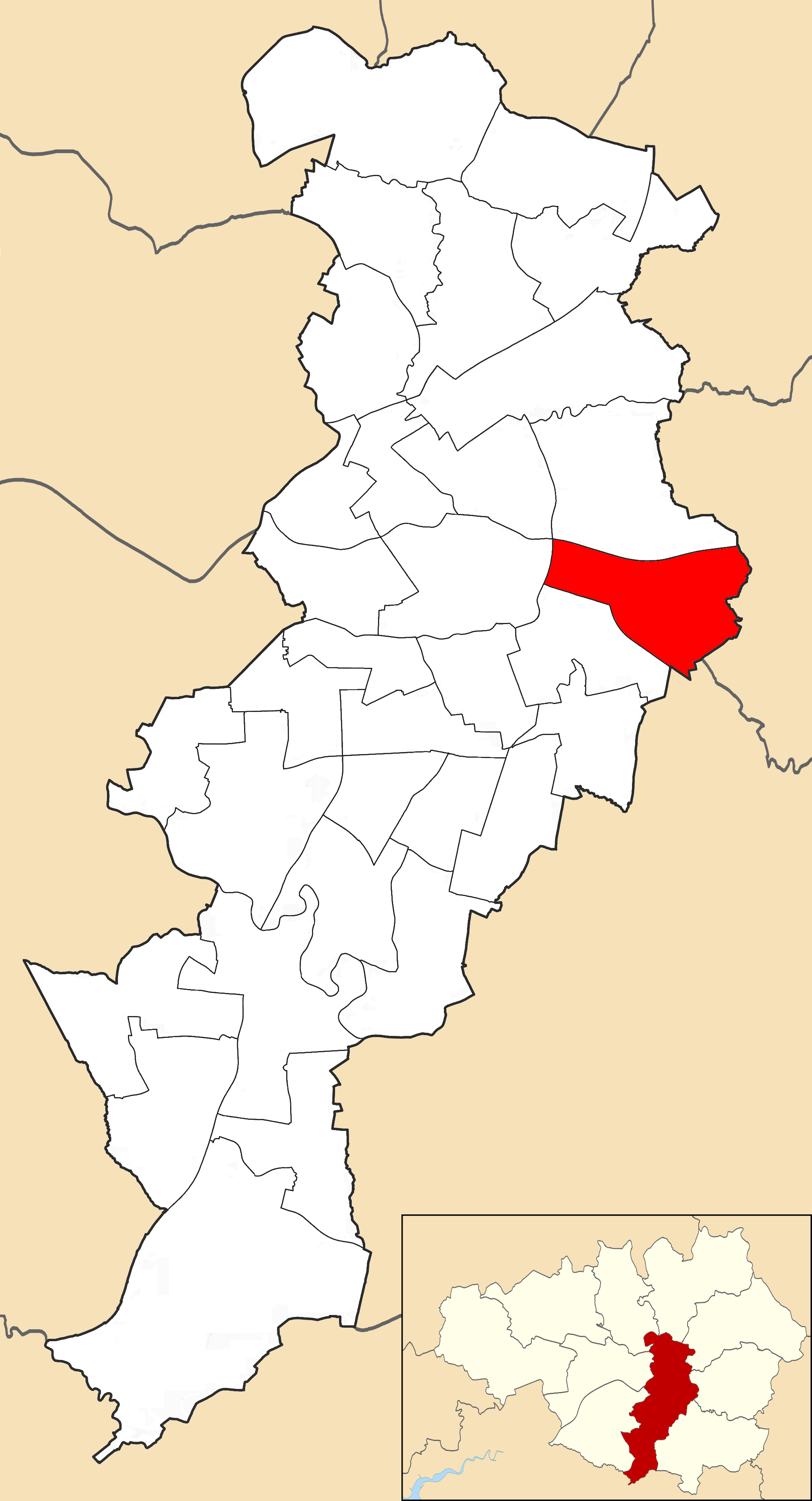
- Gorton and Abbey Hey electoral ward within Manchester City Council

- Coat of arms
- Motto(s): By wisdom and effort
- Interactive map of Gorton and Abbey Hey
- Coordinates: 53.464526°N 2.169614°W
- Country: United Kingdom
- Constituent country: England
- Region: North West England
- County: Greater Manchester
- Metropolitan borough: Manchester
- Created: December 2017
- Named after: Gorton and Abbey Hey

Government UK Parliament constituency: Manchester Gorton
  - Type: Unicameral
  - Body: Manchester City Council
  - Leader of the council: Bev Craig (Labour)

Gorton and Abbey Hey is an electoral ward of Manchester, England created by the Local Government Boundary Commission for England (LGBCE) from the previous electoral wards of Gorton North and Gorton South for the local elections 2018.

It is represented in Westminster by Hannah Spencer MP for Gorton and Denton.

== Councillors ==
Two Labour councillors and one Green councillor serve the ward: Afia Kamal, Julie Reid, and Chris Ogden, respectively.

Election	Councillor	Councillor	Councillor
2018	Afia Kamal (Lab)	Julie Reid (Lab)	John Hughes (Lab)
2019	Afia Kamal (Lab)	Julie Reid (Lab)	John Hughes (Lab)
2021	Afia Kamal (Lab)	Julie Reid (Lab)	John Hughes (Lab)
2022	Afia Kamal (Lab)	Julie Reid (Lab)	John Hughes (Lab)
2023	Afia Kamal (Lab)	Julie Reid (Lab)	John Hughes (Lab)
2024	Afia Kamal (Lab)	Julie Reid (Lab)	John Hughes (Lab)
2026	Afia Kamal (Lab)	Julie Reid (Lab)	Chris Ogden (Grn)

indicates seat up for re-election. indicates seat won in by-election.

== Elections in 2020s ==
* denotes incumbent councillor seeking re-election.

=== May 2026 ===
2026
Party	Candidate	Votes	%	±%
Green	Chris Ogden	1,489	36.7	▲29.6
Labour	John Hughes*	1,196	29.5	▼39.4
Reform	Paul Lajszczak	1,117	27.5	New
Liberal Democrats	Jackie Pearcey	169	4.2	▼9.4
Conservative	Shahab Raz	87	2.1	▼7.5
Majority		293	7.2	N/A
Turnout		4,058	27.8	▲6.0
Green gain from Labour Co-op		Swing		

=== May 2024 ===
2024
Party	Candidate	Votes	%	±%
Labour Co-op	Julie Reid*	2,206	67.3	3.4 ▼
Liberal Democrats	Jackie Pearcey	403	12.3	0.8 ▼
Green	Natasha Turner	368	11.2	6.3 ▲
Conservative	Ugo Nzeribe	248	7.6	3.7 ▼
Majority		1,803	55.0	
Rejected ballots		55	1.7	
Turnout		3,280	23.38	
Registered electors		14,031		
Labour hold		Swing	1.3 ▼	

=== May 2023 ===
2023
Party	Candidate	Votes	%	±%
Labour	Afia Kamal*	1,906	64.9	▲17.6
Liberal Democrats	Jackie Pearcey	531	18.1	▼8.3
Green	Natasha Turner	274	9.3	▲2.6
Conservative	Mokammel Alam	228	7.8	▲2.3
Majority		1,375	46.8	▲25.9
Rejected ballots				
Turnout		2,939	22.08	▼2.1
Registered electors		13,481		
Labour hold		Swing		

=== May 2022 ===
2022
Party	Candidate	Votes	%	±%
Labour Co-op	Louis Hughes*	1,996	68.9	9.0 ▲
Liberal Democrats	Jackie Pearcey	393	13.6	10.1 ▼
Conservative	Ugo Nzeribe	279	9.6	1.5 ▼
Green	Natasha Turner	207	7.1	0.7 ▼
Majority		1,603	55.3	
Rejected ballots		24		
Turnout		2,875	21.8	2.2 ▼
Registered electors		13,310		
Labour Co-op hold		Swing	9.6 ▲	

=== May 2021 ===
2021
Party	Candidate	Votes	%	±%
Labour Co-op	Julie Reid*	2,372	70.7	6.0 ▲
Liberal Democrats	Jackie Pearcey	440	13.1	7.6 ▼
Conservative	Ugo Nzeribe	378	11.3	0.3 ▼
Green	Scott Robinson	165	4.9	1.9 ▲
Majority		1,932	57.6	
Rejected ballots		57	1.7	
Turnout		3,412	25.8	1.8 ▲
Registered electors		13,243		
Labour Co-op hold		Swing	6.8 ▲	

== Elections in 2010s ==
=== May 2019 ===
2019
Party	Candidate	Votes	%	±%
Labour	Afia Kamal*	1,464	47.3	▼2.0
Liberal Democrats	Jackie Pearcey	818	26.4	▲2.7
UKIP	Katie Fanning	418	13.5	N/A
Green	Paul Davies	208	6.7	▼1.1
Conservative	Jake Feeley	170	5.5	▼6.1
Majority		646	20.86	▼4.83
Rejected ballots		19	0.61	
Turnout		3,097	24.18	Steady
Registered electors		12,810		
Labour hold		Swing	▼2.35	

=== May 2018 ===
2018
Party	Candidate	Votes	%	±%
Labour	Louis Hughes*	1,849	59.9	
Labour	Julie Reid*	1,771	57.4	
Labour	Afia Kamal*	1,523	49.4	
Liberal Democrats	Jackie Pearcey	730	23.7	
Liberal Democrats	Iain Donaldson	526	17.0	
Liberal Democrats	Tim Bannister	385	12.5	
Conservative	Paul Mostyn	342	11.1	
Conservative	Michael Street	308	10.0	
Conservative	Melissa Jackson	271	8.8	
Green	Melvyn Newton	241	7.8	
Rejected ballots		13 (full); 1 (partial)		
Turnout		3,086	24	
Registered electors		12,857		
Labour win (new seat)				
Labour win (new seat)				
Labour win (new seat)				

Party	Candidates	Seats Won	Votes	Vote %
Labour	3	3	5,143	64.72
Liberal Democrats	3	0	1,641	20.65
Conservative	3	0	921	11.59
Green	1	0	303	2.41
