= Ancoats and Beswick =

- Electoral ward
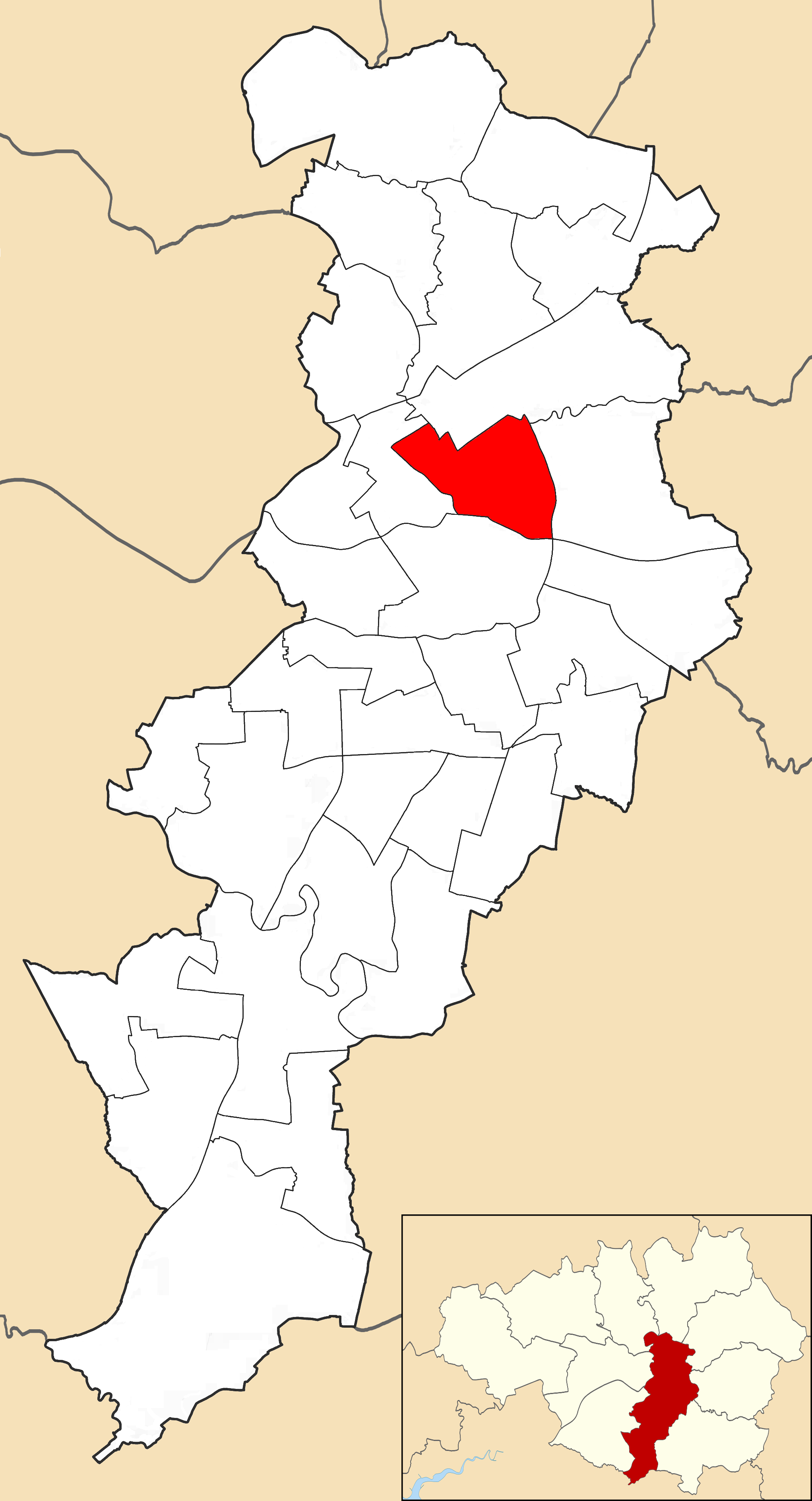
- Ancoats and Beswick electoral ward within Manchester City Council

- Coat of arms
- Motto: By wisdom and effort
- Interactive map of Ancoats and Beswick
- Coordinates: 53.4807°N 2.2074°W
- Country: United Kingdom
- Constituent country: England
- Region: North West England
- County: Greater Manchester
- Metropolitan borough: Manchester
- Created: December 2017
- Named after: Ancoats and Beswick

Government UK Parliament constituency: Manchester Central
  - Type: Unicameral
  - Body: Manchester City Council
  - Leader of the council: Bev Craig (Labour)
  - Councillor: Hussayn Salem (Green)
  - Councillor: Chris Northwood (Liberal Democrats)
  - Councillor: Alan Good (Liberal Democrats)

Ancoats and Beswick is an electoral ward of Manchester, England created by the Local Government Boundary Commission for England (LGBCE) replacing the previous electoral wards of Ancoats & Clayton and Bradford for the local elections 2018.

It is represented in Westminster by Lucy Powell MP for Manchester Central. The first councillors for the ward were elected at the 2018 local elections.

== Councillors ==
The current councillors for the ward are Chris Northwood (Liberal Democrats), Alan Good (Liberal Democrats) and Hussayn Salem (Green).

On 24 July 2019 it was reported that Majid Dar had been suspended by the Labour party. He was readmitted to the party and to the Labour group on the council shortly after.

Election	Councillor	Councillor	Councillor
2018	Majid Dar (Lab)	Emma Taylor (Lab)	Rosa Battle (Lab)
2019	Majid Dar (Lab)	Emma Taylor (Lab)	Rosa Battle (Lab)
2021	Majid Dar (Lab)	Marcia Ann Hutchinson (Lab)	Rosa Battle (Lab)
Feb 2022	Majid Dar (Lab)	Alan Good (Lib Dem)	Rosa Battle (Lab)
2022	Majid Dar (Lab)	Alan Good (Lib Dem)	Irene Robinson (Lab)
2023	Chris Northwood (Lib Dem)	Alan Good (Lib Dem)	Irene Robinson (Lab)
2024	Chris Northwood (Lib Dem)	Alan Good (Lib Dem)	Irene Robinson (Lab)
2026	Chris Northwood (Lib Dem)	Alan Good (Lib Dem)	Hussayn Salem (Grn)

indicates seat up for re-election. indicates seat won in by-election.

== Elections in 2020s ==
* denotes incumbent councillor seeking re-election.

=== May 2026 ===
Ancoats and Beswick
Party	Candidate	Votes	%	±%
Green	Hussayn Salem	1,776	42.0	▲35.4
Liberal Democrats	Luke Allan	1,095	25.9	▼17.1
Labour	Irene Robinson*	785	18.5	▼27.9
Reform	Elizabeth Drinkwater	498	11.8	New
Conservative	Saadmun Abdullah	78	1.8	▼1.6
Majority		681	16.1	N/A
Turnout		4,238	32.3	▲2.2
Rejected ballots		6	0.1	▼0.4
Registered electors		13,138		
Green gain from Labour		Swing	▲31.6	

=== May 2024 ===
2024
Party	Candidate	Votes	%	±%
Liberal Democrats	Alan Good*	1,900	49.8	27.8 ▲
Labour	Julie Jarman	1,420	37.2	20.7 ▼
Green	Kate Sophie Walsh Benson	366	9.6	1.2 ▼
Conservative	Paul Wan	76	2.0	6.3 ▼
Communist Future	Chris Strafford	33	0.9	New
Majority		480	12.6	
Rejected ballots		19	0.5	
Turnout		3,814	30.1	
Registered electors		12,679		
Liberal Democrats gain from Labour		Swing	24.3 ▲	

Alan Good was elected in a by-election in 2022; changes in vote share are compared with the regular May 2021 election cycle and on that basis this is a notional Liberal Democrat gain.

=== May 2023 ===
2023
Party	Candidate	Votes	%	±%
Liberal Democrats	Chris Northwood	1,543	49.5	▲38.5
Labour	Majid Dar*	1,208	38.7	▼16.9
Green	Jacob Buffett	250	9.6	▼8.0
Conservative	Sarah Ajiboye	94	3.0	▼5.7
Independent	Peter Clifford	9	0.3	Steady
Majority		335	10.8	
Rejected ballots		15		
Turnout		3,119	25.79	▲4.51
Registered electors		12,093		
Liberal Democrats gain from Labour		Swing	▲27.7	

=== May 2022 ===
2022
Party	Candidate	Votes	%	±%
Labour	Irene Robinson	1,332	46.4	25.6 ▼
Liberal Democrats	Chris Northwood	1,234	43.0	31.6 ▲
Green	Chris Perriam	190	6.6	10.2 ▼
Conservative	Steven Kelly	99	3.4	8.9 ▼
Majority		98	3.4	
Rejected ballots		16	0.6	
Turnout		2,871	24.1	3.1 ▲
Registered electors		11,925		
Labour hold		Swing	28.6 ▼	

=== February 2022 ===
On 30 November 2021 councillor Marcia Hutchinson resigned from her seat in Ancoats & Beswick, citing allegations of bullying and racism within the Labour group. A by-election was held on 3 February 2022, which was won by the Liberal Democrat candidate Alan Good.

February 2022 by-election
Party	Candidate	Votes	%	±%
Liberal Democrats	Alan Good	1,113	53.2	31.0▲
Labour	Gareth Worthington	793	37.9	20.6▼
Green	Chris Perriam	119	5.7	5.3▼
Conservative	Alexander Bramham	66	3.2	5.8▼
Majority		320	15.3	10.6▼
Turnout		2,091	17.84	12.5▼
Liberal Democrats gain from Labour		Swing	25.6▲	

=== May 2021 ===
2021
Party	Candidate	Votes	%	±%
Labour	Marcia Hutchinson	2,052	57.9	5.5 ▼
Liberal Democrats	Alan Good	779	22.0	12.9 ▲
Green	Ryan Johns	384	10.8	6.0 ▼
Conservative	Alexander Bramham	293	8.3	2.5 ▼
Majority		1,273	25.9	13.5 ▼
Rejected ballots		39	1.1	
Turnout		3,547	30.3	9.3 ▲
Registered electors		11,702		
Labour hold		Swing	9.2 ▼	

== Elections in 2010s ==
=== May 2019 ===
2019
Party	Candidate	Votes	%	±%
Labour	Mohammed Majid Dar*	1,192	55.6	▼0.6
Green	Robyn Schreibke	378	17.6	▲0.8
Liberal Democrats	Jane McQueen	236	11.0	▲2.0
Conservative	Daniel Bell	187	8.7	▼2.1
UKIP	Trevor Wongsam	143	6.7	n/a
Majority		814	37.9	▼1.4
Rejected ballots		9	0.42	
Turnout		2,145	21.28	Steady
Registered electors		10,079		
Labour hold		Swing	▼0.75	

=== May 2018 ===
2018
Party	Candidate	Votes	%	±%
Labour	Rosa Battle*	1,475	72.0	
Labour	Emma Taylor*	1,272	62.1	
Labour	Mohammed Majid Dar	1,152	56.2	
Green	Eliza Tyrrell	345	16.8	
Conservative	Michael Barnes	253	12.3	
Liberal Democrats	Christopher Wilkinson	233	11.4	
Conservative	Barney Watson	223	10.9	
Conservative	Adam Williams	189	9.2	
Liberal Democrats	Lynne Williams	169	8.2	
Liberal Democrats	Simon Lepori	157	7.7	
Majority		807	39.4	
Turnout		2,049	21	
Labour win (new seat)				
Labour win (new seat)				
Labour win (new seat)				
