= Woodhouse Park =

Suburban area of Manchester, England

Coordinates: 53.378°N 2.267°W

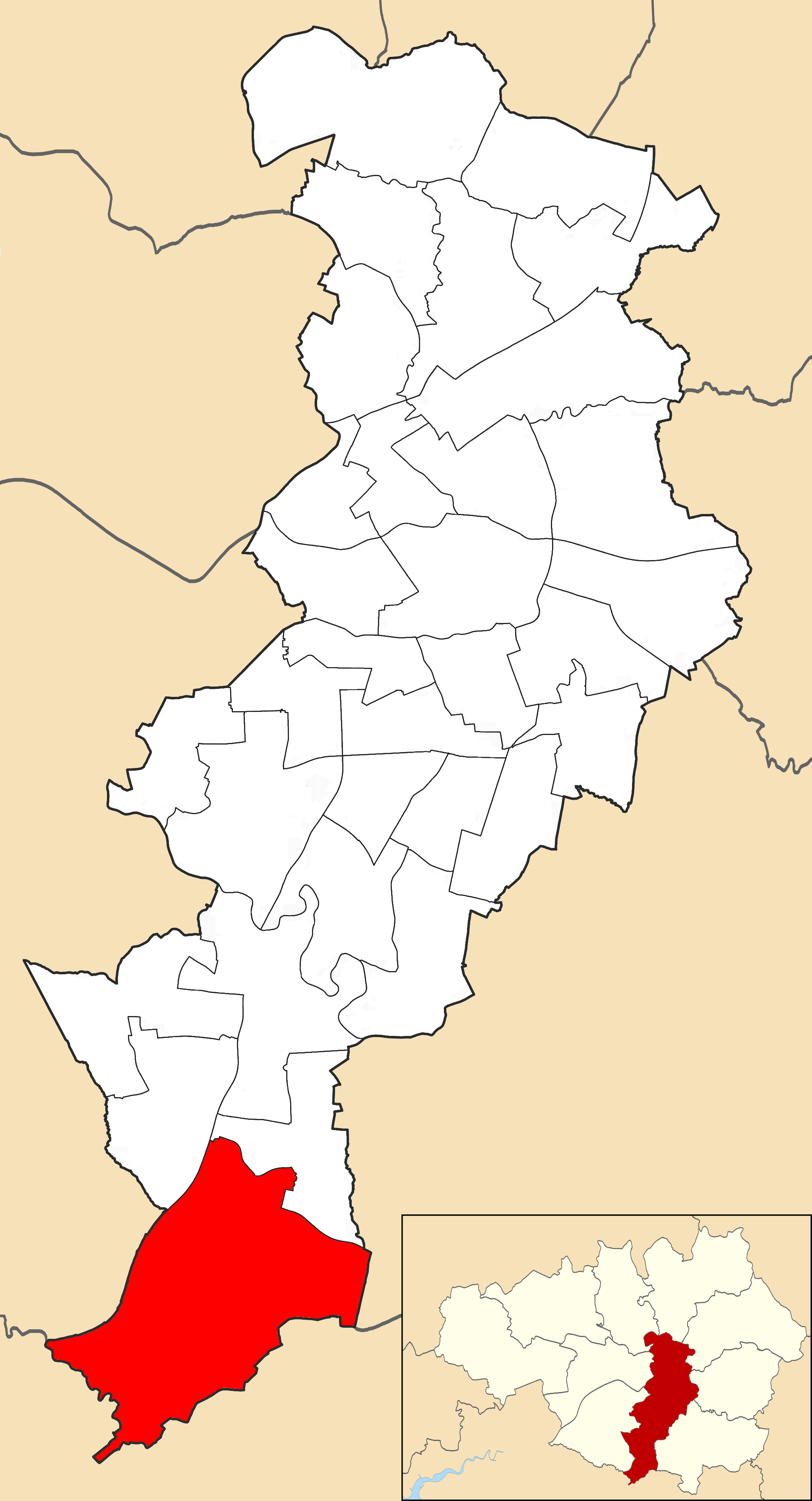
- Woodhouse Park electoral ward within Manchester City Council.

- Location within Greater Manchester
- Population: 13,519 (2011)
- Metropolitan borough: City of Manchester
- Metropolitan county: Greater Manchester
- Region: North West
- Country: England
- Sovereign state: United Kingdom
- Post town: MANCHESTER
- Postcode district: M22
- Police: Greater Manchester
- Fire: Greater Manchester
- Ambulance: North West
- UK Parliament: Wythenshawe and Sale East
- Councillors: Astrid Johnson (Green); Zoe Marlow (Green); Rob Nunney (Green)

Woodhouse Park is an area of Wythenshawe in south Manchester, England. The population of the ward at the 2011 census was 13,519.

== Geography ==
The area borders Newall Green, on the other side of the M56 motorway, from which it is served by Junctions 4 (Wythenshawe) and 5 (Manchester Airport), to the west, Moss Nook to the south and south-east, Peel Hall to the east and Benchill to the north.

The Manchester Metrolink Airport Line runs through Woodhouse Park.

== Governance ==
Woodhouse Park is part of the Wythenshawe and Sale East constituency, represented by the Labour Party MP Mike Kane.

In 2003, Benchill was disestablished as a local government ward and the area divided between Woodhouse Park, Sharston, and Northenden.

The Manchester City Council Woodhouse Park electoral Ward incorporates the areas of Woodhouse Park described above as well as Moss Nook, Ringway Parish Council and Manchester Airport and has three Councillors to represent all these areas: Zoe Marlow (Grn), Rob Nunney (Grn), and Astrid Johnson (Grn).

Election	Councillor	Councillor	Councillor
2018	Edward Newman (Lab)	Brian O'Neil (Lab)	Sarah Judge (Lab)
2019	Edward Newman (Lab)	Brian O'Neil (Lab)	Sarah Judge (Lab)
2021	Edward Newman (Lab)	Rob Nunney (Grn)	Sarah Judge (Lab)
2022	Edward Newman (Lab)	Rob Nunney (Grn)	Astrid Johnson (Grn)
2023	Anastasia Wiest (Grn)	Rob Nunney (Grn)	Astrid Johnson (Grn)
2024	Anastasia Wiest (Grn)	Rob Nunney (Grn)	Astrid Johnson (Grn)
Sep 2025	Zoe Marlow (Grn)	Rob Nunney (Grn)	Astrid Johnson (Grn)
2026	Zoe Marlow (Grn)	Rob Nunney (Grn)	Astrid Johnson (Grn)

indicates seat up for election. indicates seat won in by-election.

== Housing ==
As part of Wythenshawe, the majority of housing in Woodhouse Park is social housing, mostly former council housing stock. Following a democratic vote, the former council properties are now under the control of local housing associations. Due to greater access to government funding, the housing associations have invested a great deal into the local area, improving the quality of maintenance of the housing stock. Local leisure facilities have also been improved as part of an urban regeneration programme.

== Police ==
The Greater Manchester Police is responsible for Woodhouse Park.
