= Clayton and Openshaw =

- Electoral ward
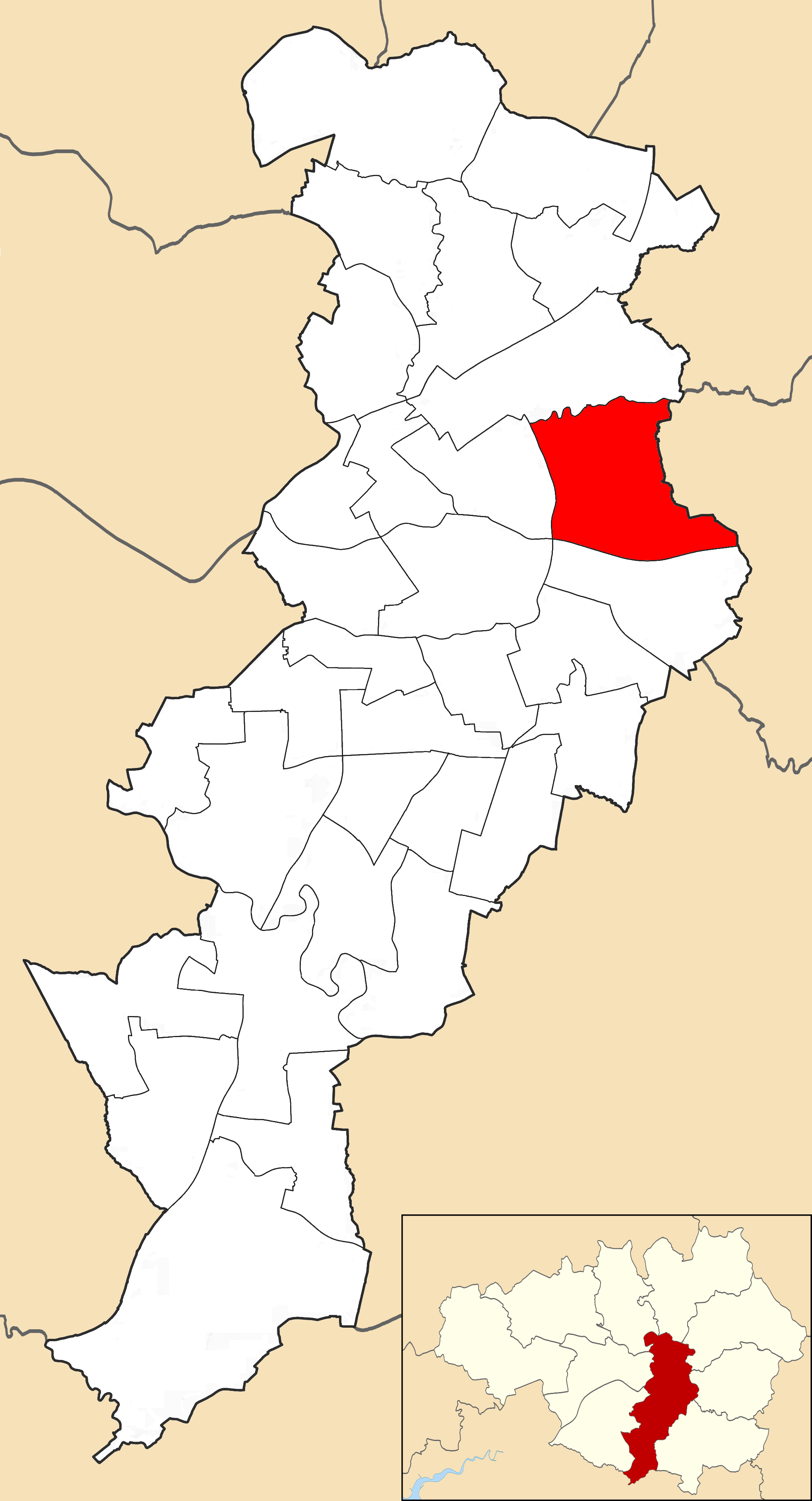
- Clayton and Openshaw electoral ward within Manchester City Council

- Coat of arms
- Motto: By wisdom and effort
- Interactive map of Clayton and Openshaw
- Coordinates: 53.4837°N 2.1801°W
- Country: United Kingdom
- Constituent country: England
- Region: North West England
- County: Greater Manchester
- Metropolitan borough: Manchester
- Created: December 2017
- Named after: Clayton and Openshaw

Government UK Parliament constituency: Manchester Central
  - Type: Unicameral
  - Body: Manchester City Council
  - Leader of the council: Bev Craig (Labour)
  - Councillor: Sean McHale (Labour)
  - Councillor: Donna Ludford (Labour)
  - Councillor: Thomas Robinson (Labour)

Clayton and Openshaw is an area and electoral ward of Manchester, England created by the Local Government Boundary Commission for England (LGBCE) replacing the previous electoral wards of Ancoats & Clayton and Bradford for the local elections 2018.

It is represented in Westminster by Lucy Powell MP for Manchester Central.

== Councillors ==
Three Labour councillors currently serve the ward: Sean McHale, Donna Ludford and Thomas Robinson.

Election	Councillor	Councillor	Councillor
2018	Sean McHale (Lab)	Donna Ludford (Lab)	Andy Harland (Lab)
2019	Sean McHale (Lab)	Donna Ludford (Lab)	Andy Harland (Lab)
By-election Feb 2020	Sean McHale (Lab)	Donna Ludford (Lab)	Ken Dobson (Ind)
2021	Sean McHale (Lab)	Donna Ludford (Lab)	Thomas Robinson (Lab)
2022	Sean McHale (Lab)	Donna Ludford (Lab)	Thomas Robinson (Lab)
2023	Sean McHale (Lab)	Donna Ludford (Lab)	Andy Harland (Lab)
2024	Sean McHale (Lab)	Donna Ludford (Lab)	Andy Harland (Lab)
2026	Sean McHale (Lab)	Donna Ludford (Lab)	Thomas Robinson (Lab)

indicates seat up for election. indicates seat won in by-election.

== Elections in 2020s ==
* denotes incumbent councillor seeking re-election.

=== May 2026 ===
2026
Party	Candidate	Votes	%	±%
Labour	Thomas Robinson*	1,308	35.9	▼35.7
Green	Sean Duggan	1,013	27.8	▲16.7
Reform	Jacob Barlow	996	27.3	New
Conservative	Ramzi Swaray-Kella	180	4.9	▼6.1
Liberal Democrats	Zinette Bates	151	4.1	▼1.5
Majority		295	8.1	▼52.4
Turnout		3,648	26.6	▲5.8
Labour hold		Swing		

=== May 2024 ===
2024
Party	Candidate	Votes	%	±%
Labour	Donna Ludford*	2,191	72.6	3.3 ▲
Green	Samsuzzaman Syed	359	11.9	3.5 ▲
Conservative	Ramzi Swaray-Kella	216	7.2	5.9 ▼
Liberal Democrats	Maria Theresa Turner	211	7.0	0.3 ▼
Majority		1,832	60.7	
Rejected ballots		39	1.3	
Turnout		3,016	22.59	
Registered electors		13,350		
Labour hold		Swing	0.1 ▼	

=== May 2023 ===
2023
Party	Candidate	Votes	%	±%
Labour	Sean McHale*	2,008	76.1	31.5 ▲
Conservative	Ramzi Swaray-Kella	204	7.7	4.2 ▲
Liberal Democrats	Maria Turner	202	7.7	4.4 ▲
Green	Billie Nagle	198	7.5	3.9 ▲
Majority		1,804	68.4	68.0 ▲
Rejected ballots		26	1.0	0.3 ▲
Turnout		2,638	20.4	−4.7 ▼
Registered electors		12,943		
Labour hold		Swing	13.7 ▲	

=== May 2022 ===
Note: The incumbent councillor, Thomas Robinson, was elected in May 2021.

2022
Party	Candidate	Votes	%	±%
Labour	Thomas Robinson*	1,892	71.6	0.7 ▲
Green	Amanda Evans	293	11.1	3.7 ▲
Conservative	Ramzi Swaray-Kella	291	11.0	3.7 ▲
Liberal Democrats	Maria Turner	148	5.6	3.8 ▼
Majority		1,599	60.5	
Rejected ballots		17		
Turnout		2,624	20.8	4.1 ▼
Registered electors		12,680		
Labour hold		Swing	1.5 ▼	

=== May 2021 ===
2021
Party	Candidate	Votes	%	±%
Labour	Donna Ludford*	2,064	69.3	
Labour	Thomas Robinson	1,560	52.4	
Conservative	Keith Berry	389	13.1	
Green	Daniel Kyle	250	8.4	
Liberal Democrats	Diele Nsumbu	218	7.3	
Green	Robyn Schreibke	204	6.9	
Conservative	Ramzi Swaray-Kella	193	6.5	
Liberal Democrats	Martha O'Donoghue	120	4.0	
Majority				
Rejected ballots		32		
Turnout		2,978	23.98	
Registered electors		12,553		
Labour hold		Swing		
Labour gain from Independent		Swing		

=== By-election: 27 February 2020 ===
Councillor Andy Harland died in December 2019. A by-election took place on Thursday 27 February 2020 to fill the vacancy.

By-election: Clayton & Openshaw - 27th February 2020
Party	Candidate	Votes	%	±%
Independent	Ken Dobson	1,191	47.9	▲3.4
Labour	Sherita Mandongwe	1,083	43.6	▼1.4
Conservative	Sham Raja Akhtar	102	4.1	▲0.6
Liberal Democrats	Claude-Diele Nsumbu	57	2.3	▼1.0
Green	Jake Welsh	51	2.1	▼1.6
Majority		112	3.3	N/A
Rejected ballots		5	0.2	
Turnout		2,489	19.7	
Registered electors		12,623		
Independent gain from Labour		Swing	▲2.4	

== Elections in 2010s ==
=== May 2019 ===
2019
Party	Candidate	Votes	%	±%
Labour	Sean McHale*	1,346	44.6%	▼9.1%
Independent	Ken Dobson	1,334	44.2%	▲23.9%
Green	Jake Welsh	109	3.6%	▼3.7%
Conservative	Fahim Ahmad Choudhury	106	3.5%	▼3.8%
Liberal Democrats	Maria Turner	99	3.3%	▼2.2%
Majority		12	0.40%	
Rejected ballots		21	0.70%	
Turnout		3,015	25.05%	▲1.5%
Registered electors		12,036		
Labour hold		Swing	▼16.5%	

=== May 2018 ===
2018
Party	Candidate	Votes	%	±%
Labour	Andy Harland	2,103	70.9%	
Labour	Donna Ludford*	1,722	58.0%	
Labour	Sean McHale	1,592	53.7%	
Independent	Kenneth Dobson	603	20.3%	
Liberal Democrats	Elaine Boyes	279	9.4%	
Green	Paul Brunger	220	7.4%	
Conservative	Archie Galbraith	217	7.3%	
Liberal Democrats	Richard Clayton	162	5.5%	
Conservative	Aimen Javaid	152	5.1%	
Conservative	Chenjie Zhang	142	4.8%	
Liberal Democrats	Dan Willis	118	4.0%	
Majority				
Turnout		2,967	24.9%	
Labour win (new seat)				
Labour win (new seat)				
Labour win (new seat)				
