= 2019 Manchester City Council election =

2019 local election in England

- 2 May 2019

33 of 96 seats (One Third) to Manchester City Council 49 seats needed for a majority
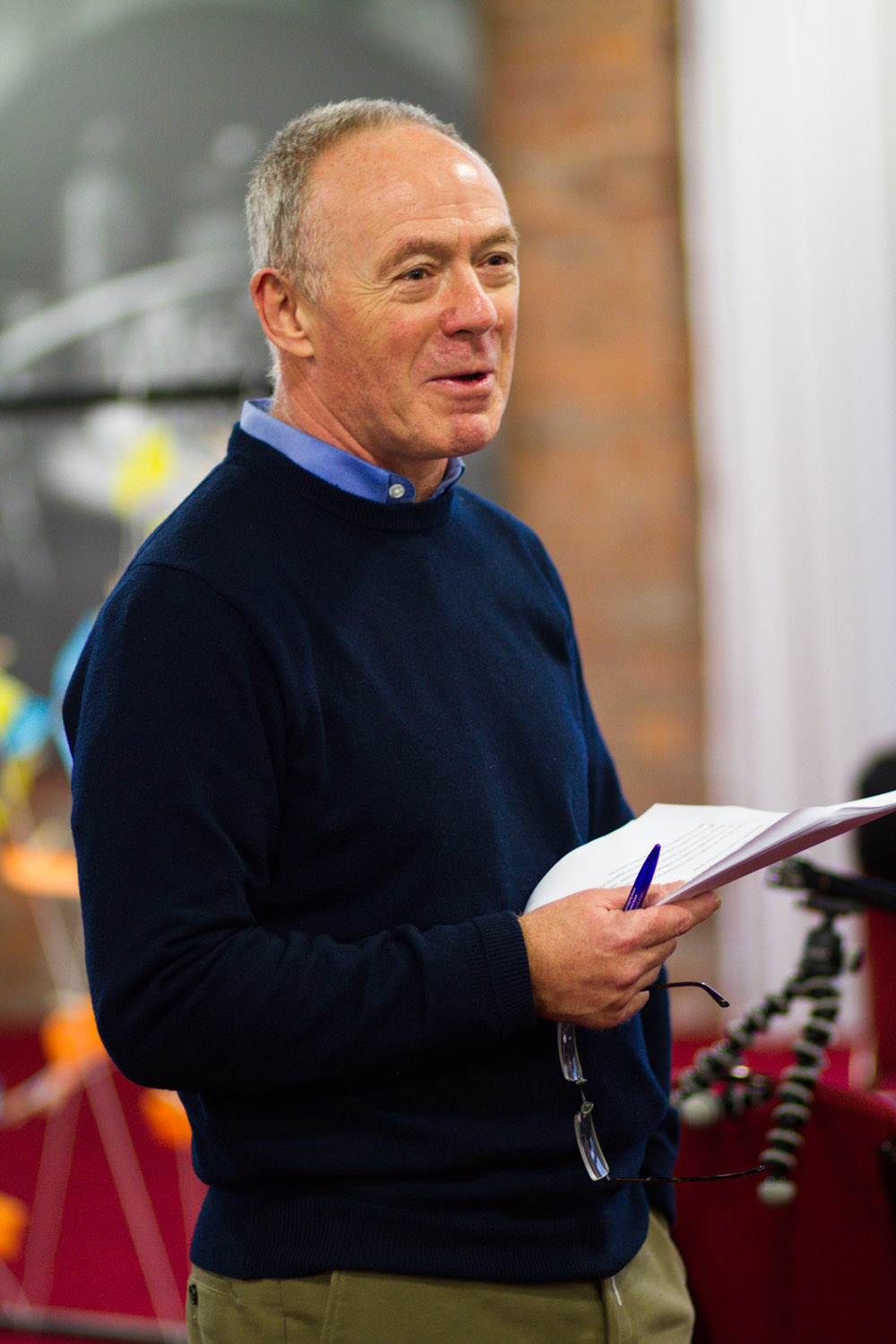

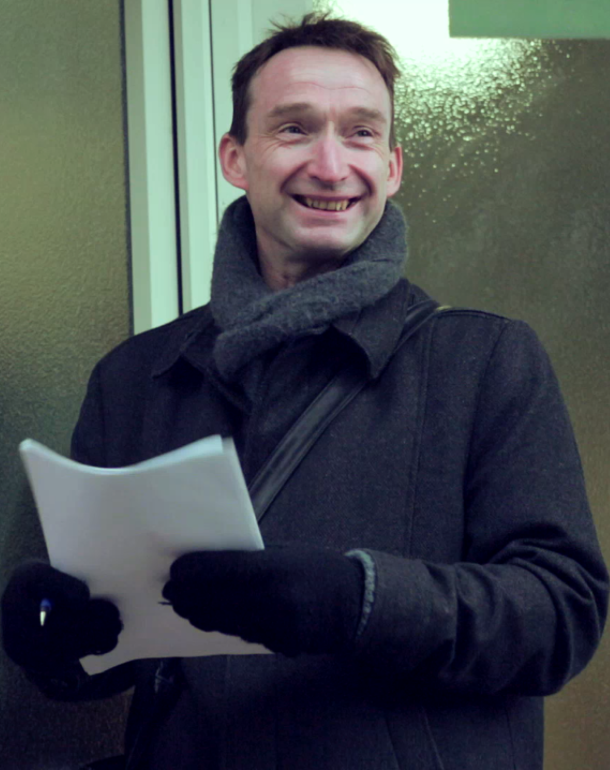
	First party	Second party
Leader	Richard Leese	John Leech
Party	Labour	Liberal Democrats
Leader since	20 May 1996	5 May 2016
Leader's seat	Crumpsall	Didsbury West
Last election	33	0
Seats won	32	1
Seat change	▼1	▲1
Popular vote	56,380	13,358
Percentage	58.6%	13.9%
Swing	▼6.19%
Leader of Largest Party before election
Richard Leese
Labour
Leader of Largest Party after election
Richard Leese
Labour

Elections to Manchester City Council were held on 2 May 2019, as part of the 2019 United Kingdom local elections. In 2018 Labour retained its majority of the council with 94 seats to the Liberal Democrats making up the opposition of 2, led by former MP John Leech.

== Background and campaign ==
Labour won every seat on Manchester City Council between 2011 and 2015. In 2016, former Liberal Democrat MP John Leech, who lost his seat in Manchester Withington in the 2015 General Election won a seat in Didsbury West and was joined by another Liberal Democrat Councillor in 2018.

Following the resignation of Fallowfield councillor Grace Fletcher-Hackwood on 19 March, two vacancies were filled in the Fallowfield ward; the candidate who received the most votes won the full four-year term and the second placed candidate took over the three years remaining of the vacant seat.

On 25 March, Manchester Lib Dem leader John Leech launched his party's manifesto for the 2019 elections. This was followed by the Green Party launching their manifesto for the local elections on 9 April.

On 15 April, The Times uncovered a number of offensive tweets from Fallowfield Labour candidate Jade Doswell. In 2014, Doswell had tweeted that she was a "little bit sick in my mouth" at the sight of an Israeli flag and claimed the flag was 'offensive' and provocative’. She apologised on a private Facebook post.

On 17 April, Manchester Evening News reported that the Liberal Democrat candidate for Hulme, Daniel Tóth-Nagy, had been suspended from the party after tweeting "There is no such thing as Islamophobia" and making other comments deemed Islamophobic. Tóth-Nagy denied that he had ever "express[ed] hatred or violent against any person", but the party issued a statement condemning the comments and immediately withdrew their support for him.

On 30 April, the Manchester Evening News reported that the Conservative candidate for Charlestown, Charalampos Kagouras, had been dropped by the party as a candidate due to years of racist and Islamophobic posts on social media.

== Results summary ==
Map of the results of the 2019 Manchester council election, with Labour in red and Liberal Democrats in amber.

Changes are compared with the 2018 results. Socialist Alternative changes in vote share are compared to the results for Trade Unionist and Socialist Coalition. Where 2 seats were contested simultaneously due to a vacancy the results for that ward have been normalised.

2019 Manchester City Council election
Party	This election				Full council			This election		
Party	Candidates	Seats	Net	Seats %	Other	Total	Total %	Votes	Votes %	+/−
Labour	{{{candidates}}}	32/33	▼1	97.0	61	93	96.9	55,134	58.60	▼11.40
Liberal Democrats	{{{candidates}}}	1/33	▲1	3.0	2	3	3.1	13,188	14.02	▲1.23
Green	{{{candidates}}}	0/33	0	0.0	0	0	0.0	12,164	13.04	▲6.50
Conservative	{{{candidates}}}	0/33	0	0.0	0	0	0.0	6,212	6.58	▼2.70
UKIP	{{{candidates}}}	0/14	0	0.0	0	0	0.0	4,155	4.42	▲4.15
Independent	{{{candidates}}}	0/7	0	0.0	0	0	0.0	2,735	2.91	▲2.27
Women's Equality	{{{candidates}}}	0/4	0	0.0	0	0	0.0	418	0.44	▲0.22
For Britain	{{{candidates}}}	0/1	0	0.0	0	0	0.0	38	0.04	N/A
Socialist	{{{candidates}}}	0/1	0	0.0	0	0	0.0	25	0.03	▼0.09
Communist League	{{{candidates}}}	0/1	0	0.0	0	0	0.0	12	0.01	Steady

== Council composition ==
Before the election, the composition of the council was:

↓
94	2
Labour	LD

After the election, the composition of the council is:

↓
93	3
Labour	LD

== Ward results ==
Asterisks denote incumbent Councillors seeking re-election. Councillors seeking re-election were elected in 2018, and results are compared to that year's polls on that basis.

=== Ancoats and Beswick ===
Ancoats and Beswick
Party	Candidate	Votes	%	±%
Labour	Mohammed Majid Dar*	1,192	55.6	▼0.6
Green	Robyn Schreibke	378	17.6	▲0.8
Liberal Democrats	Jane McQueen	236	11.0	▲2.0
Conservative	Daniel Bell	187	8.7	▼2.1
UKIP	Trevor Wongsam	143	6.7	n/a
Majority		814	37.9	▼1.4
Rejected ballots		9	0.42	
Turnout		2,145	21.28	Steady
Registered electors		10,079		
Labour hold		Swing	▼0.75	

=== Ardwick ===
Ardwick
Party	Candidate	Votes	%	±%
Labour	Amna Abdullatif	1,692	71.2	▲2.4
Liberal Democrats	George Rice	243	10.2	▲4.1
Green	Kara Ng	242	10.2	▼2.1
Conservative	Archie Galbraith	171	7.2	▲0.2
Majority		1,449	61.0	
Rejected ballots		28	1.18	
Turnout		2,376	19.04	▼1.2
Registered electors		12,480		
Labour hold		Swing	▼0.85	

=== Baguley ===
Baguley
Party	Candidate	Votes	%	±%
Labour	Luke Raikes*	1,192	52.7	▲2.5
UKIP	Paul O'Donoughue	364	16.1	n/a
Conservative	Peter Harrop	343	15.2	▼0.7
Green	Sarah Mander	222	9.8	▼0.5
Liberal Democrats	Nick Saunders	107	4.7	▼0.2
Communist League	Hugo Wils	12	0.5	n/a
Majority		828	36.6	▲7.0
Rejected ballots		22	0.97	
Turnout		2,264	20.26	
Registered electors		11,176		
Labour hold		Swing	▼6.8	

=== Brooklands ===
Brooklands
Party	Candidate	Votes	%	±%
Labour	Sue Murphy*	1,336	49.3	▼1.3
Conservative	Stephen Carlton-Woods	463	17.1	▼9.9
UKIP	Kathy Mason	389	14.4	n/a
Green	Grace Buczkowska	301	11.1	Steady
Liberal Democrats	Sebastian Bate	203	7.5	▲2.7
Majority		873	32.2	▲7.6
Rejected ballots		18	0.66	
Turnout		2,710	24.29	▼0.8
Registered electors		11,157		
Labour hold		Swing	▲4.3	

=== Burnage ===
Burnage
Party	Candidate	Votes	%	±%
Labour	Azra Ali*	2,337	64.0	▲0.7
Liberal Democrats	Andrea Timoney	570	15.6	▼2.2
Green	Benjamin Dundas	362	9.9	▼0.6
UKIP	Ian Rae	233	6.4	n/a
Conservative	Shahed Hossain	149	4.1	▼1.5
Majority		1,767	48.2	▲2.7
Rejected ballots		18	0.49	
Turnout		3,668	28.66	▼3.9
Registered electors		12,800		
Labour hold		Swing	▲1.45	

=== Charlestown ===
Charlestown
Party	Candidate	Votes	%	±%
Labour	Basil Curley*	1,387	52.8	▼3.2
Independent	Anthony Brennan	415	15.8	▼2.1
UKIP	Stephen O'Neill	387	14.7	n/a
Conservative	Charalampos Kagkouras	180	6.8	▼6.8
Green	Astrid Johnson	159	6.0	▼3.9
Liberal Democrats	Charles Turner	88	3.3	▼3.0
Majority		972	37.0	▼0.9
Rejected ballots		13	0.49	
Turnout		2,629	22.25	▼0.8
Registered electors		11,817		
Labour hold		Swing	▼0.55	

=== Cheetham ===
Cheetham
Party	Candidate	Votes	%	±%
Labour	Shazia Butt	3,047	81.0	▲10.4
Green	Dave Taylor	183	4.9	▼2.0
Independent	Rafique Malik	150	4.0	n/a
UKIP	James Miller	121	3.2	n/a
Liberal Democrats	Gary McKenna	117	3.1	▼2.0
Conservative	Azmat Husain	109	2.9	▼1.6
Majority		2,864	76.2	▲16.9
Rejected ballots		33	0.88	
Turnout		3,760	30.35	▼1.3
Registered electors		12,390		
Labour hold		Swing	▲6.2	

=== Chorlton ===
Chorlton
Party	Candidate	Votes	%	±%
Labour	Matt Strong*	2,574	57.0	▼3.0
Green	Mary Crumpton	950	21.0	▲6.3
Liberal Democrats	Lizzy Bain	575	12.7	▲0.3
Conservative	Keith Berry	212	4.7	▼0.4
Women's Equality	Jo Heathcote	146	3.2	▼6.2
Independent	Michael Elston	59	1.3	▼1.6
Majority		1,624	35.7	▼9.5
Rejected ballots		29	0.64	
Turnout		4,545	43.50	▼2.8
Registered electors		10,452		
Labour hold		Swing	▼4.65	

=== Chorlton Park ===
Chorlton Park
Party	Candidate	Votes	%	±%
Labour	Dave Rawson*	2,577	54.3	▼1.0
Green	Mary Candeland	1,042	22.0	▲9.5
Liberal Democrats	Amaan Hashmi	857	18.1	▼5.0
Conservative	Christopher Halliday	269	5.7	▲1.7
Majority		1,535	32.1	▲2.2
Rejected ballots		42	0.88	
Turnout		4,787	37.10	▼4.2
Registered electors		12,904		
Labour hold		Swing	▼5.25	

=== Clayton and Openshaw ===
Clayton and Openshaw
Party	Candidate	Votes	%	±%
Labour	Sean McHale*	1,346	44.6	▼9.0
Independent	Ken Dobson	1,334	44.2	▲23.9
Green	Jake Welsh	109	3.6	▼3.7
Conservative	Fahim Ahmad Choudhury	106	3.5	▼3.8
Liberal Democrats	Maria Turner	99	3.3	▼2.2
Majority		12	0.40	▼33.0
Rejected ballots		21	0.70	
Turnout		3,015	25.05	▲1.5
Registered electors		12,036		
Labour hold		Swing	▼16.45	

=== Crumpsall ===
Crumpsall
Party	Candidate	Votes	%	±%
Labour	Fiaz Riazat*	2,402	71.6	▲4.8
Conservative	Sham Akhtar	294	8.8	▼1.8
Green	Adam King	214	6.4	▼1.5
UKIP	Ernest Willescroft	159	4.7	▲0.8
Liberal Democrats	Andrew McGuinness	143	4.3	▼1.2
Women's Equality	Samantha Days	82	2.4	n/a
For Britain	Brian Sallis	38	1.1	n/a
Majority		2,108	62.9	▲6.7
Rejected ballots		22	0.66	
Turnout		3,354	29.96	▼4.0
Registered electors		11,203		
Labour hold		Swing	▲3.3	

=== Deansgate ===
Deansgate
Party	Candidate	Votes	%	±%
Labour	William Jeavons*	497	34.8	▼4.0
Liberal Democrats	John Bridges	449	31.4	▲6.7
Green	Christopher Ogden	252	17.6	▼3.4
Conservative	Connor Watson	126	8.8	▼3.9
Women's Equality	Sam Johnson	105	7.3	▼3.9
Majority		48	3.36	▼10.7
Rejected ballots		9	0.63	
Turnout		1429	19.81	▲0.43
Registered electors		7,258		
Labour hold		Swing	▼5.35	

=== Didsbury East ===
Didsbury East
Party	Candidate	Votes	%	±%
Labour	James Wilson*	1,948	41.9	▼4.3
Liberal Democrats	John Cameron	1,889	40.6	▲5.8
Green	Wendy Lynas	491	10.6	▼0.1
Conservative	James Flanagan	286	6.2	▼1.3
Majority		59	1.27	▼9.7
Rejected ballots		34	0.73	
Turnout		4,648	41.71	▼2.9
Registered electors		11,144		
Labour hold		Swing	▼5.05	

=== Didsbury West ===
Didsbury West
Party	Candidate	Votes	%	±%
Liberal Democrats	Greg Stanton	2,214	50.2	▲9.1
Labour	David Ellison*	1,490	33.8	▼7.7
Green	Arnold Spencer	430	9.8	▼3.0
Conservative	Anjenarra Haque	170	3.9	▼1.9
Women's Equality	Sarika Paul	85	1.9	N/A
Majority		724	16.4	
Rejected ballots		18	0.73	
Turnout		4,407	37.60	▼0.9
Registered electors		11,717		
Liberal Democrats gain from Labour		Swing	▲8.4	

=== Fallowfield ===
Fallowfield (2)
Party	Candidate	Votes	%	±%
Labour	Jade Doswell	1,279	65.1	▼4.7
Labour	Ali R. Ilyas*	1,213	61.7	▼0.5
Green	Lottie Donovan	371	18.9	▲2.4
Green	Anne Power	315	16.0	▼0.5
Liberal Democrats	Lauren Coleman-Bennett	191	9.7	▲1.6
Liberal Democrats	Jamie Dwan	148	7.5	▼0.6
Conservative	Mike Hannon	111	5.6	▼0.4
Conservative	Rory Tinker	92	4.7	▼1.2
Majority		842	42.8	▼2.9
Rejected ballots		25	1.27	
Turnout		1,965	16.55	▼0.4
Registered electors		11,879		
Labour hold		Swing	▼3.75	
Labour hold		Swing		

=== Gorton and Abbey Hey ===
Gorton and Abbey Hey
Party	Candidate	Votes	%	±%
Labour	Afia Kamal*	1,464	47.3	▼2.0
Liberal Democrats	Jackie Pearcey	818	26.4	▲2.7
UKIP	Katie Fanning	418	13.5	N/A
Green	Paul Davies	208	6.7	▼1.1
Conservative	Jake Feeley	170	5.5	▼6.1
Majority		646	20.86	▼4.83
Rejected ballots		19	0.61	
Turnout		3,097	24.18	Steady
Registered electors		12,810		
Labour hold		Swing	▼2.35	

=== Harpurhey ===
Harpurhey
Party	Candidate	Votes	%	±%
Labour	Pat Karney*	1,510	63.1	▲4.1
UKIP	Michael Felse	319	13.3	n/a
Conservative	Gareth Brown	232	9.7	▼6.7
Green	Vicky Matthews	215	9.0	▼2.5
Liberal Democrats	Lynne Williams	102	4.3	n/a
Majority		1,191	49.8	▲7.2
Rejected ballots		15	0.63	
Turnout		2,393	19.24	▼0.8
Registered electors		12,445		
Labour hold		Swing	▼4.6	

=== Higher Blackley ===
Higher Blackley
Party	Candidate	Votes	%	±%
Labour	Paula Sadler*	1,378	56.4	▼4.8
UKIP	Lee Seville	431	17.6	n/a
Liberal Democrats	Peter Matthews	230	9.4	▼1.3
Green	Adrian Thompson	214	8.8	▼2.0
Conservative	Alexandru Stancu	190	7.8	▼3.0
Majority		947	38.8	▼4.9
Rejected ballots		14	0.57	
Turnout		2,443	21.78	▼0.9
Registered electors		11,283		
Labour hold		Swing	▼11.2	

=== Hulme ===
Hulme
Party	Candidate	Votes	%	±%
Labour	Annette Wright*	1,530	62.1	▲0.4
Green	Issy Patience	620	25.2	▲7.6
Liberal Democrats	Dániel Tóth-Nagy	163	6.6	Steady
Conservative	Jessica Beaumont	125	6.6	▲0.7
Majority		910	36.9	▼5.2
Rejected ballots		26	1.06	
Turnout		2464	21.60	▼0.7
Registered electors		11,408		
Labour hold		Swing	▼3.6	

- On 17 April, Dániel Tóth-Nagy was suspended by the Liberal Democrats over allegedly Islamophobic comments made on social media.

=== Levenshulme ===
Levenshulme
Party	Candidate	Votes	%	±%
Labour	Basat Mahmood Sheikh*	2,524	65.9	▲0.8
Green	Dick Venes	604	15.8	▼2.7
Liberal Democrats	Andrew Hickey	370	9.7	▲0.9
UKIP	Bob Catterall	218	5.7	▲1.9
Conservative	James Smith	88	2.3	▼1.0
Majority		1,920	50.2	▲3.6
Rejected ballots		24	0.63	
Turnout		3,828	31.02	▼2.9
Registered electors		12,344		
Labour hold		Swing	▲1.75	

=== Longsight ===
Longsight
Party	Candidate	Votes	%	±%
Labour	Suzanne Richards*	2,501	76.5	▲4.0
Conservative	Shahana Choudhary	344	10.5	▲5.6
Liberal Democrats	Kobe Bibbon	214	6.5	▲2.9
Green	Bernard Ekbery	189	5.8	▲0.2
Majority		2,157	65.9	▼1.0
Rejected ballots		23	0.70	
Turnout		3,271	26.44	▼2.5
Registered electors		12,370		
Labour hold		Swing	▼0.8	

=== Miles Platting and Newton Heath ===
Miles Platting and Newton Heath
Party	Candidate	Votes	%	±%
Labour	John Flanagan*	1,601	60.3	▼3.0
UKIP	Christopher Owen	459	17.3	▲6.7
Green	Stephanie Wyatt	213	8.0	▼1.6
Independent	Francesco Falcioni	133	5.0	n/a
Conservative	Michael Ciotkowski	128	4.8	▼4.0
Liberal Democrats	Simon Lepori	101	3.8	n/a
Majority		1,142	43.0	▼9.7
Rejected ballots		21	0.79	
Turnout		2,656	21.25	▼1.1
Registered electors		12,499		
Labour hold		Swing	▼4.95	

=== Moss Side ===
Moss Side
Party	Candidate	Votes	%	±%
Labour	Mahadi Hussein Sharif Mahamed*	2,485	78.9	▲10.2
Green	Kristine Pearson	339	10.8	▲0.3
Liberal Democrats	Andrew Stevens	186	5.9	▲0.9
Conservative	Luke Costello	109	3.5	▲0.2
Majority		2,146	68.1	▲9.9
Rejected ballots		30	0.95	
Turnout		3,149	24.98	▼3.0
Registered electors		12,600		
Labour hold		Swing	▲4.95	

=== Moston ===
Moston
Party	Candidate	Votes	%	±%
Labour	Yasmine Dar*	1,430	46.5	▼10.1
Independent	Mike Pattillo	527	17.1	n/a
UKIP	Mark Davies	467	15.1	n/a
Conservative	Stephen McHugh	309	10.1	▼9.8
Green	Eithne Quinn	181	5.9	▼6.2
Liberal Democrats	Charles Glover	118	3.8	n/a
Socialist	Grace Donaghey	25	0.8	n/a
Majority		901	29.3	▼5.8
Rejected ballots		17	0.55	
Turnout		3,074	24.02	▼2.0
Registered electors		12,797		
Labour hold		Swing	▼13.6	

=== Northenden ===
Northenden
Party	Candidate	Votes	%	±%
Labour	Sarah Russell*	1,431	56.9	▲0.5
Green	Simon Gray	389	15.5	▲0.6
Conservative	Ralph Ellerton	349	13.9	▼3.1
Liberal Democrats	Mark Saunders	231	9.2	▲3.2
Independent	Donald Oink A-Lot	117	4.6	▲3.3
Majority		1,042	41.4	▲3.1
Rejected ballots		20	0.79	
Turnout		2,517	23.42	▼2.7
Registered electors		10,832		
Labour hold		Swing	▼0.05	

=== Old Moat ===
Old Moat
Party	Candidate	Votes	%	±%
Labour	Garry Bridges*	1,754	62.9	▼5.4
Green	Bonnie Boulton	468	16.8	▲0.2
Liberal Democrats	Jon Martin	386	13.8	▼0.2
Conservative	Tom Benbow	144	5.2	▼0.9
Majority		1,286	46.1	▼5.6
Rejected ballots		37	1.33	
Turnout		2,789	26.27	▼1.5
Registered electors		10,628		
Labour hold		Swing	▼2.8	

=== Piccadilly ===
Piccadilly
Party	Candidate	Votes	%	±%
Labour	Sam Wheeler*	596	42.6	▼9.7
Liberal Democrats	Joe Lynch	357	25.5	▲3.5
Green	Brian Candeland	336	24.0	▼0.3
Conservative	Paul Wan	98	7.0	▼2.2
Majority		239	17.1	▼11.9
Rejected ballots		13	0.93	▲0.43
Turnout		1,400	19.58	▼0.50
Registered electors		7,149		
Labour hold		Swing	▼6.6	

=== Rusholme ===
Rusholme
Party	Candidate	Votes	%	±%
Labour	Ahmed Ali*	2,266	74.9	▲2.6
Green	Kate Walsh Benson	384	12.7	▲0.2
Liberal Democrats	Holly Matthies	201	6.6	▼2.5
Conservative	Shazia Anjum	148	4.9	▲0.9
Majority		1,882	62.2	▲2.4
Rejected ballots		27	0.89	
Turnout		3,026	26.19	▼1.0
Registered electors		11,555		
Labour hold		Swing	▲1.2	

=== Sharston ===
Sharston
Party	Candidate	Votes	%	±%
Labour Co-op	Tim Whiston	1,286	56.7	▼8.1
UKIP	Philip Matthews	403	17.8	n/a
Green	Sylvia Buchan	247	10.9	▲1.4
Conservative	Jagdeep Mehat	191	8.4	▼4.5
Liberal Democrats	Helen Shaw	135	5.9	▲0.8
Majority		883	38.9	▼5.2
Rejected ballots		7	0.31	
Turnout		2,269	19.73	▼0.1
Registered electors		11,501		
Labour Co-op hold		Swing	▼12.95	

=== Whalley Range ===
Whalley Range
Party	Candidate	Votes	%	±%
Labour Co-op	Angeliki Stogia*	2,524	69.1	▲12.5
Green	Eliza Tyrell	777	21.3	▼5.3
Liberal Democrats	Philip Manktelow	199	5.4	▲2.6
Conservative	David Semple	123	3.4	▲0.1
Majority		1,747	47.8	▲22.2
Rejected ballots		32	0.88	
Turnout		3,655	33.19	▼3.7
Registered electors		11,013		
Labour Co-op hold		Swing	▲8.9	

=== Withington ===
Withington
Party	Candidate	Votes	%	±%
Labour	Becky Chambers	1,442	44.6	▼11.5
Liberal Democrats	April Preston	1,339	41.4	▲8.4
Green	Nathan Rae	331	10.2	▼5.2
Conservative	Shaden Jaradat	101	3.1	▼1.5
Majority		103	3.2	▼10.6
Rejected ballots		21	0.65	
Turnout		3,234	31.27	▲0.77
Registered electors		10,341		
Labour hold		Swing	▼9.5	

=== Woodhouse Park ===
Woodhouse Park
Party	Candidate	Votes	%	±%
Labour	Eddy Newman*	1,149	51.4	▼11.3
Green	Rob Nunney	771	34.5	▲28.2
Conservative	Ken Wedderburn	195	8.7	▼5.7
Liberal Democrats	Anna Hablak	79	3.5	▼1.5
Majority		378	16.9	▼28.1
Rejected ballots		42	2.06	
Turnout		2,236	20.36	▲2.36
Registered electors		10,989		
Labour hold		Swing	▼19.75	

== Changes since this election ==
On 24 July 2019 it was reported that Majid Dar (Ancoats and Beswick) had been suspended by the Labour Party. He was readmitted to the party and to the Labour group on the council without formal announcement.

On 18 March 2020 Greg Stanton (Didsbury West) resigned from the Liberal Democrats to sit as an independent. Later, in April, he joined the Labour Party.

On 7 April 2020, Sue Murphy (Brooklands) died after a long illness.

=== Clayton and Openshaw by-election ===
Clayton and Openshaw councillor Andy Harland died in December 2019. A by-election took place on Thursday 27 February 2020 to fill the vacancy. Changes are compared with the 2019 result.

By-election: Clayton & Openshaw - 27th February 2020
Party	Candidate	Votes	%	±%
Independent	Ken Dobson	1,191	47.9	▲3.4
Labour	Sherita Mandongwe	1,083	43.6	▼1.4
Conservative	Sham Raja Akhtar	102	4.1	▲0.6
Liberal Democrats	Claude-Diele Nsumbu	57	2.3	▼1.0
Green	Jake Welsh	51	2.1	▼1.6
Majority		112	3.3	N/A
Rejected ballots		5	0.2	
Turnout		2,489	19.7	
Registered electors		12,623		
Independent gain from Labour		Swing	▲2.4	
