= 2018 Manchester City Council election =

2018 local election in England

- 3 May 2018

All 96 seats to Manchester City Council 49 seats needed for a majority
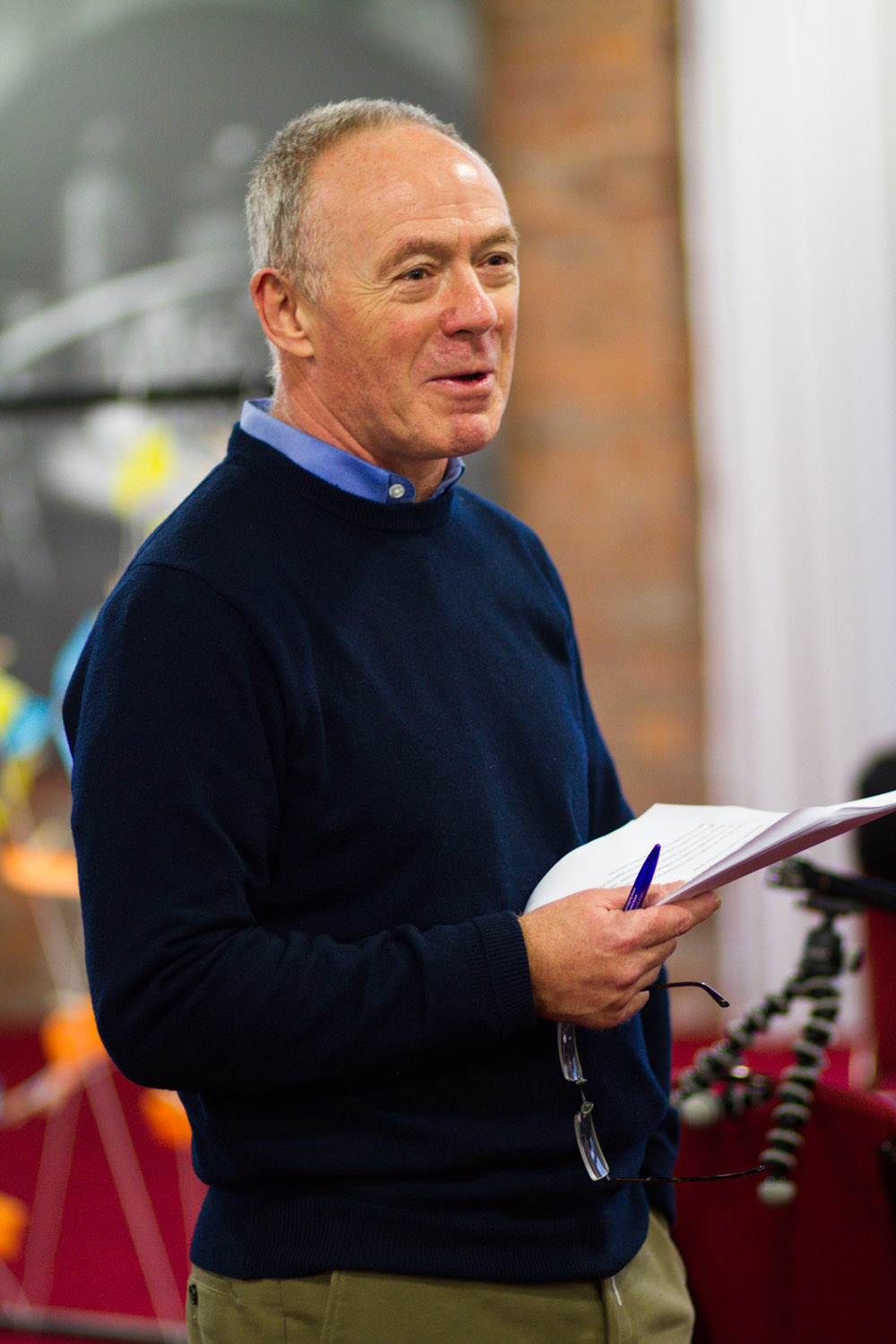

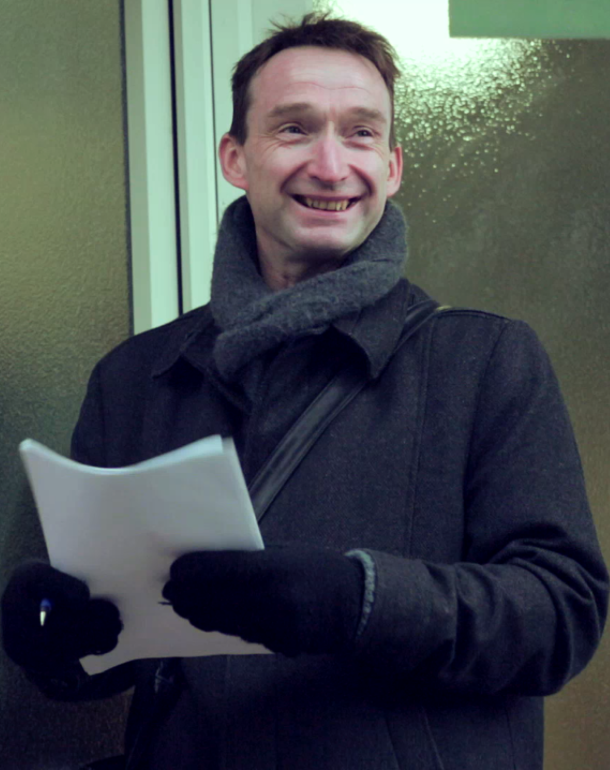
	First party	Second party
Leader	Richard Leese	John Leech
Party	Labour	Liberal Democrats
Leader since	20 May 1996	5 May 2016
Leader's seat	Crumpsall	Didsbury West
Seats before	95	1
Seats won	94	2
Seat change	▼1	▲1
Popular vote	189,401	34,573
Percentage	70.2%	12.8%
Swing	▲6.1%	▲1.7%
Leader of Largest Party before election
Richard Leese
Labour
Leader of Largest Party after election
Richard Leese
Labour

Elections to Manchester City Council were held on 3 May 2018, as part of the 2018 United Kingdom local elections. Although the council is normally elected in thirds, all 96 council seats were up for election due to boundary changes. Labour retained its near-complete dominance of the council. The sole change was that the Liberal Democrats gained a second seat in Didsbury West.

== Background and Campaign ==
From 2014 to 2016, Labour were the only party represented on the council. In 2016, former MP John Leech won a seat in Didsbury West and sat as the only opposition councillor for two years.

On 9 April 2018, it was reported that the Labour Party had received formal complaints about Chris Paul, Labour councillor for Withington since 2011. There were social media comments describing women as “cows”, “slobs” and “bitches”, and inciting violence against women. Greater Manchester Police, The Labour Party and Manchester City Council all launched investigations and Paul eventually apologised. Paul was re-elected in Withington ward with a reduced majority beating Lib Dem candidate April Preston.

Following reports of a last-minute search for eligible candidates, the Manchester Conservative Party announced on 10 April, it would be fielding three candidates in all 32 wards within the city.

John Leech launched the Liberal Democrats 'Manchester Together' campaign.

== Results Summary ==
Map of the results of the 2018 Manchester council election, with Labour in red and Liberal Democrats in amber.

2018 Manchester City Council election
Party	Candidates						Votes		
Party	Stood	Elected	Gained	Unseated	Net	% of total	%	No.	Net %
Labour	96	94	0	1	▼1	97.9	70.00	189,401	▲5.87
Liberal Democrats	76	2	1	0	▲1	2.1	12.78	34,573	▲1.65
Conservative	96	0	0	0	Steady	0.0	9.30	25,158	▲2.32
Green	38	0	0	0	Steady	0.0	6.43	17,402	▼2.43
Independent	7	0	0	0	Steady	0.0	0.64	1,729	▼0.88
UKIP	4	0	0	0	Steady	0.0	0.27	736	▼5.93
Women's Equality	2	0	0	0	Steady	0.0	0.23	629	N/A
TUSC	3	0	0	0	Steady	0.0	0.12	337	▼0.79
Communist League	1	0	0	0	Steady	0.0	0.01	19	Steady

== Council Composition ==
Prior to the election, the composition of the council was:

↓
95	1
Labour	LD

After the election, the composition of the council is:

↓
94	2
Labour	LD

== Ward results ==
Asterisks denote incumbent Councillors seeking re-election. All results are listed below:

=== Ancoats and Beswick ===
Ancoats and Beswick (3)
Party	Candidate	Votes	%	±%
Labour	Rosa Battle*	1,475	72.0	
Labour	Emma Taylor*	1,272	62.1	
Labour	Mohammed Majid Dar	1,152	56.2	
Green	Eliza Tyrrell	345	16.8	
Conservative	Michael Barnes	253	12.3	
Liberal Democrats	Christopher Wilkinson	233	11.4	
Conservative	Barney Watson	223	10.9	
Conservative	Adam Williams	189	9.2	
Liberal Democrats	Lynne Williams	169	8.2	
Liberal Democrats	Simon Lepori	157	7.7	
Majority		807	39.4	
Turnout		2,049	21	
Labour win (new seat)				
Labour win (new seat)				
Labour win (new seat)				

=== Ardwick ===
Ardwick (3)
Party	Candidate	Votes	%	±%
Labour	Tina Hewitson*	2,012	72.0	
Labour	Bernard Priest*	1,821	67.9	
Labour	Mavis Smitheman*	1,703	63.5	
Green	Samantha Goodchild	329	12.3	
Conservative	Rebecca Thompson	229	8.5	
Conservative	Shahzadi Begum	173	6.4	
Conservative	Sarah-Jane Trelfa	165	6.1	
Liberal Democrats	Beth Waller	163	6.1	
Majority				
Turnout		2,683	20.3	
Labour win (new boundaries)				
Labour win (new boundaries)				
Labour win (new boundaries)				

=== Baguley ===
Baguley (3)
Party	Candidate	Votes	%	±%
Labour	Paul Andrews*	1,485	68.0	
Labour	Tracey Rawlins*	1,281	58.7	
Labour	Luke Raikes*	1,095	50.2	
Conservative	Ralph Ellerton	450	20.6	
Conservative	Jagdeep Mehat	314	14.4	
Conservative	Manjit Mehat	275	12.6	
Green	Sarah Mander	224	10.3	
Liberal Democrats	Matt Downey	128	5.9	
Liberal Democrats	Eleanor Nagle	113	5.2	
Liberal Democrats	Theo Penn	82	3.8	
Majority				
Turnout		2,183	19.6	
Labour win (new boundaries)				
Labour win (new boundaries)				
Labour win (new boundaries)				

=== Brooklands ===
Brooklands (3)
Party	Candidate	Votes	%	±%
Labour	Sue Cooley*	1,684	59.7	
Labour	Glynn Evans*	1,635	58.0	
Labour	Sue Murphy*	1,456	51.6	
Conservative	Stephen Carlton-Woods	763	27.0	
Conservative	Stephen McHugh	705	25.0	
Conservative	David Semple	634	22.5	
Green	Robert Nunney	313	11.1	
Liberal Democrats	Paul Jones	153	5.4	
Liberal Democrats	Norman Lewis	134	4.8	
Liberal Democrats	Bernie Ryan	117	4.1	
Majority				
Turnout		2,821	25.1	
Labour win (new boundaries)				
Labour win (new boundaries)				
Labour win (new boundaries)				

=== Burnage ===
Burnage (3)
Party	Candidate	Votes	%	±%
Labour	Ben Clay	2,913	69.5	
Labour	Bev Craig*	2,853	68.1	
Labour	Azra Ali*	2,652	63.3	
Liberal Democrats	Andrea Timoney	747	17.8	
Liberal Democrats	Maria Turner	541	12.9	
Liberal Democrats	Mohamed Sabbagh	457	10.9	
Green	Lance Crookes	442	10.5	
Conservative	Samuel Baxter	291	6.9	
Conservative	Lexi Webster	241	5.8	
Conservative	Shahed Hossain	234	5.6	
Majority				
Turnout		4,191	32.6	
Labour win (new boundaries)				
Labour win (new boundaries)				
Labour win (new boundaries)				

=== Charlestown ===
Charlestown (3)
Party	Candidate	Votes	%	±%
Labour	Veronica Kirkpatrick*	1,769	64.8	
Labour	Hannah Priest*	1,541	56.4	
Labour	Basil Curley*	1,531	56.0	
Independent	Anthony Brennan	489	17.9	
Conservative	Peter Schofield	433	15.8	
Conservative	Daniel Somers	358	13.1	
Conservative	Michael Shupac	326	11.9	
Green	Astrid Johnson	271	9.9	
Liberal Democrats	Charles Turner	172	6.3	
Majority				
Turnout		2,732	23.1	
Labour win (new boundaries)				
Labour win (new boundaries)				
Labour win (new boundaries)				

=== Cheetham ===
Cheetham (3)
Party	Candidate	Votes	%	±%
Labour	Naeem-Ul Hassan*	2,943	75.0	
Labour	Shaukat Ali*	2,755	70.2	
Labour	Julie Connolly*	2,613	66.6	
Green	Dave Taylor	271	6.9	
Conservative	Pamela Goldfine	215	5.5	
Liberal Democrats	Paul Crane	202	5.1	
Conservative	Hannah Levy	186	4.7	
Conservative	Charalampos Kagkouras	132	3.4	
Majority				
Turnout		3,926	31.7	
Labour win (new boundaries)				
Labour win (new boundaries)				
Labour win (new boundaries)				

=== Chorlton ===
Chorlton (3)
Party	Candidate	Votes	%	±%
Labour	John Hacking*	3,175	64.1	
Labour	Eve Holt	3,165	63.9	
Labour	Matt Strong*	2,974	60.0	
Green	Nigel Woodcock	731	14.8	
Green	Mary Crumpton	728	14.7	
Green	Anne Power	653	13.2	
Liberal Democrats	Lizzy Bain	614	12.4	
Liberal Democrats	Joanne Milligan	507	10.2	
Women's Equality	Jo Heathcote	465	9.4	
Liberal Democrats	Rhona Brown	463	9.3	
Conservative	Luke Berry	301	6.1	
Conservative	Luke Costello	242	4.9	
Conservative	John Edwards	221	4.5	
Independent	Michael Elston	145	2.9	
Majority				
Turnout		4,955	46.3	
Labour win (new boundaries)				
Labour win (new boundaries)				
Labour win (new boundaries)				

=== Chorlton Park ===
Chorlton Park (3)
Party	Candidate	Votes	%	±%
Labour	Joanna Midgley*	3,404	63.5	
Labour	Mandie Shilton-Godwin*	3,027	56.5	
Labour	Dave Rawson*	2,967	55.3	
Liberal Democrats	Rosie Hughes	1,363	25.4	
Liberal Democrats	Amaan Hashmi	1,238	23.1	
Liberal Democrats	Sebastian Bate	1,234	23.0	
Green	Mary Candeland	669	12.5	
Green	Brian Candeland	530	9.9	
Conservative	Keith Berry	255	4.8	
Conservative	Kelly Geddes	197	3.7	
Conservative	Andrew Tang	155	2.9	
Majority				
Turnout		5,362	41.3	
Labour win (new boundaries)				
Labour win (new boundaries)				
Labour win (new boundaries)				

=== Clayton and Openshaw ===
Clayton and Openshaw (3)
Party	Candidate	Votes	%	±%
Labour	Andy Harland	2,103	70.9	
Labour	Donna Ludford*	1,722	58.0	
Labour	Sean McHale	1,592	53.7	
Independent	Kenneth Dobson	603	20.3	
Liberal Democrats	Elaine Boyes	279	9.4	
Green	Paul Brunger	220	7.4	
Conservative	Archie Galbraith	217	7.3	
Liberal Democrats	Richard Clayton	162	5.5	
Conservative	Aimen Javaid	152	5.1	
Conservative	Chenjie Zhang	142	4.8	
Liberal Democrats	Dan Willis	118	4.0	
Majority				
Turnout		2,967	24.9	
Labour win (new seat)				
Labour win (new seat)				
Labour win (new seat)				

=== Crumpsall ===
Crumpsall (3)
Party	Candidate	Votes	%	±%
Labour	Richard Leese*	2,783	73.9	
Labour	Nasrin Ali	2,644	70.2	
Labour	Fiaz Riasat	2,517	66.8	
Conservative	Sham Akhtar	399	10.6	
Conservative	Mohammad Malik	303	8.0	
Green	Penny Swann	298	7.9	
Conservative	Shun Wah Tang	263	7.0	
Liberal Democrats	Sarah Brown	206	5.5	
UKIP	Mark Davies	148	3.9	
Independent	Peter Rowe	138	3.7	
TUSC	Grace Donaghey	104	2.8	
Majority				
Turnout		3,768	34	
Labour win (new boundaries)				
Labour win (new boundaries)				
Labour win (new boundaries)				

=== Deansgate ===
Deansgate (3)
Party	Candidate	Votes	%	±%
Labour	Joan Davies*	782	53.3	
Labour	Marcus Johns	604	41.1	
Labour	William Jeavons	570	38.8	
Liberal Democrats	John Bridges	362	24.7	
Liberal Democrats	Gary McKenna	311	21.2	
Green	Christopher Ogden	308	21.0	
Liberal Democrats	George Rice	285	19.4	
Conservative	Russ George	196	13.4	
Conservative	Lee Evans	185	12.6	
Independent	Nick Buckley	164	11.2	
Women's Equality	Sam Johnson	164	11.2	
Conservative	Charles Latchford	151	10.3	
Independent	Giles Grover	99	6.7	
Majority		208		
Rejected ballots		2	0.026	
Turnout		1,468	19.38	
Registered electors		7,573		
Labour win (new seat)				
Labour win (new seat)				
Labour win (new seat)				

=== Didsbury East ===
Didsbury East (3)
Party	Candidate	Votes	%	±%
Labour	Andrew Simcock*	2,549	51.9	
Labour	Kelly Simcock*	2,440	49.7	
Labour	James Wilson*	2,268	46.2	
Liberal Democrats	Bryn Coombe	1,729	35.2	
Liberal Democrats	Dominic Hardwick	1,728	35.2	
Liberal Democrats	John Cameron	1,710	34.8	
Green	Wendy Lynas	524	10.7	
Conservative	James Flanagan	368	7.5	
Conservative	Ian Mason	300	6.1	
Conservative	Phelim Rowe	274	5.6	
Majority				
Turnout		4,909	43.6	
Labour win (new boundaries)				
Labour win (new boundaries)				
Labour win (new boundaries)				

=== Didsbury West ===
Didsbury West (3)
Party	Candidate	Votes	%	±%
Liberal Democrats	John Leech*	2,524	55.2	
Liberal Democrats	Richard Kilpatrick	1,994	43.6	
Labour	David Ellison*	1,899	41.5	
Liberal Democrats	Greg Stanton	1,878	41.1	
Labour	Laura Wright	1,781	39.0	
Labour	Peter Cookson	1,567	34.3	
Green	Arnold Spencer	587	12.8	
Conservative	Connor Walsh	275	6.0	
Conservative	Thomas Beach	271	5.9	
Conservative	Xin Shi	206	4.5	
Majority		21		
Turnout		4,571	47.5	
Liberal Democrats win (new boundaries)				
Liberal Democrats win (new boundaries)				
Labour win (new boundaries)				

- Leech's win in 2016 signified the first gain for any party in Manchester other than Labour for the first time in six years and provided Manchester with its first opposition for two years. After the 2018 election he was selected as Leader of the Opposition.

=== Fallowfield ===
Fallowfield (3)
Party	Candidate	Votes	%	±%
Labour	Grace Fletcher-Hackwood*	1,627	74.1	
Labour	Zahra Alijah*	1,608	73.3	
Labour	Ali Ilyas*	1,366	62.2	
Green	Adrian Thompson	363	16.5	
Liberal Democrats	Robin Grayson	213	9.7	
Liberal Democrats	Gemma Kilday	162	7.4	
Liberal Democrats	Jem Arpa	159	7.2	
Conservative	Nathan Denham	147	6.7	
Conservative	Rory Tinker	130	5.9	
Conservative	Adam Goldfine	118	5.4	
Majority				
Turnout		2,195	17	
Labour win (new boundaries)				
Labour win (new boundaries)				
Labour win (new boundaries)				

=== Gorton and Abbey Hey ===
Gorton and Abbey Hey (3)
Party	Candidate	Votes	%	±%
Labour	Louis Hughes*	1,849	59.9	
Labour	Julie Reid*	1,771	57.4	
Labour	Afia Kamal*	1,523	49.4	
Liberal Democrats	Jackie Pearcey	730	23.7	
Liberal Democrats	Iain Donaldson	526	17.0	
Liberal Democrats	Tim Bannister	385	12.5	
Conservative	Paul Mostyn	342	11.1	
Conservative	Michael Street	308	10.0	
Conservative	Melissa Jackson	271	8.8	
Green	Melvyn Newton	241	7.8	
Rejected ballots		13 (full); 1 (partial)		
Turnout		3,086	24	
Registered electors		12,857		
Labour win (new seat)				
Labour win (new seat)				
Labour win (new seat)				

=== Harpurhey ===
Harpurhey (3)
Party	Candidate	Votes	%	±%
Labour	Sandra Collins*	1,773	71.5	
Labour	Joanne Green*	1,656	66.7	
Labour	Pat Karney*	1,464	59.0	
Conservative	Gareth Brown	408	16.4	
Conservative	Jodie Goldfine	329	13.3	
Green	Vicky Matthews	285	11.5	
Conservative	Ivor Levy	279	11.2	
TUSC	Jack Metcalf	118	4.8	
Majority				
Turnout		2,481	20.1	
Labour win (new boundaries)				
Labour win (new boundaries)				
Labour win (new boundaries)				

=== Higher Blackley ===
Higher Blackley (3)
Party	Candidate	Votes	%	±%
Labour	John Farrell*	1,811	70.6	
Labour	Shelley Lanchbury*	1,591	62.1	
Labour	Paula Sadler*	1,570	61.2	
Conservative	Bernard Goldfine	449	17.5	
Conservative	Nicholas Grimshaw	383	14.9	
Conservative	Alexandru Stancu	278	10.8	
Green	David Halligan	276	10.8	
Liberal Democrats	Peter Matthews	274	10.7	
Majority				
Turnout		2,564	22.7	
Labour win (new boundaries)				
Labour win (new boundaries)				
Labour win (new boundaries)				

=== Hulme ===
Hulme (3)
Party	Candidate	Votes	%	±%
Labour	Lee-Ann Igbon*	1,913	72.1	
Labour	Nigel Murphy*	1,731	65.2	
Labour	Annette Wright	1,638	61.7	
Green	Melanie Horrocks	521	19.6	
Green	Dave James	413	15.6	
Conservative	Timothy Dawson	182	6.9	
Liberal Democrats	Richard Gadsen	180	6.8	
Liberal Democrats	James Ross	180	6.8	
Liberal Democrats	Thomas Mitchell	165	6.2	
Conservative	Phillip Page	152	5.7	
Conservative	Thomas Paterson	135	5.1	
Majority				
Turnout		2,653	22.3	
Labour win (new boundaries)				
Labour win (new boundaries)				
Labour win (new boundaries)				

=== Levenshulme ===
Levenshulme (3)
Party	Candidate	Votes	%	±%
Labour	Dzidra Noor*	3,031	71.9	
Labour	Bernard Stone*	2,995	71.1	
Labour	Basat Sheikh*	2,745	65.1	
Green	Ieuan Hall	779	18.5	
Liberal Democrats	Charles Glover	558	13.2	
Liberal Democrats	Mark Saunders	319	7.6	
Liberal Democrats	Nicholas Saunders	239	5.7	
Conservative	Lawrence Rosenberg	187	4.4	
UKIP	Bob Catterall	161	3.8	
Conservative	James Smith	138	3.3	
Conservative	Elisheva Walker	106	2.5	
Majority				
Turnout		4,213	34	
Labour win (new boundaries)				
Labour win (new boundaries)				
Labour win (new boundaries)				

=== Longsight ===
Longsight (3)
Party	Candidate	Votes	%	±%
Labour	Abid Chohan*	2,821	79.0	
Labour	Luthfur Rahman*	2,655	74.3	
Labour	Suzanne Richards*	2,590	72.5	
Green	Bernard Ekbery	201	5.6	
Conservative	Javaid Hussain	197	5.5	
Conservative	Mark Shaw	172	4.8	
Liberal Democrats	Andrew Hickey	156	4.4	
Conservative	Joshua Phillips	150	4.2	
Liberal Democrats	Katie McKellar	132	3.7	
UKIP	Katie Fanning	130	3.6	
Liberal Democrats	Philip Stubbs	101	2.8	
Communist League	Catharina Tirsen	19	0.5	
Majority				
Turnout		3,573	29	
Labour win (new boundaries)				
Labour win (new boundaries)				
Labour win (new boundaries)				

=== Miles Platting and Newton Heath ===
Miles Platting and Newton Heath (3)
Party	Candidate	Votes	%	±%
Labour	Carmine Grimshaw*	1,969	70.5	
Labour	June Hitchen*	1,953	69.9	
Labour	John Flanaghan*	1,769	63.3	
UKIP	Martin Power	297	10.6	
Conservative	Beverley Cottrell	276	9.9	
Green	Paul Madley	268	9.6	
Conservative	Vera Berry	250	8.9	
Conservative	Jacqueline Mountaine	212	7.6	
TUSC	Bridget Taylor	115	4.1	
Majority				
Turnout		2,794	22.4	
Labour win (new boundaries)				
Labour win (new boundaries)				
Labour win (new boundaries)				

=== Moss Side ===
Moss Side (3)
Party	Candidate	Votes	%	±%
Labour	Sameem Ali*	2,578	71.9	
Labour	Emily Rowles*	2,538	70.8	
Labour	Mahadi Mahamed*	2,462	68.7	
Green	Kirstine Pearson	376	10.5	
Liberal Democrats	Maria Guillermo	190	5.3	
Liberal Democrats	Christopher Kane	167	4.7	
Conservative	Mark Dippnall	165	4.6	
Conservative	Shazia Riaz	98	2.7	
Conservative	Aref Goojani	89	2.5	
Majority				
Turnout		3,586	27.9	
Labour win (new boundaries)				
Labour win (new boundaries)				
Labour win (new boundaries)				

=== Moston ===
Moston (3)
Party	Candidate	Votes	%	±%
Labour	Paula Appleby*	2,407	72.1	
Labour	Carl Ollerhead*	1,938	58.0	
Labour	Yasmine Dar*	1,889	56.6	
Conservative	John Boase	718	21.5	
Conservative	Callum Goodier	656	19.6	
Conservative	Gary Wilkinson	616	18.4	
Green	Eithne Quinn	405	12.1	
Majority				
Turnout		3,340	26	
Labour win (new boundaries)				
Labour win (new boundaries)				
Labour win (new boundaries)				

=== Northenden ===
Northenden (3)
Party	Candidate	Votes	%	±%
Labour	Mary Monaghan*	1,803	66.2	
Labour	Sam Lynch	1,694	62.2	
Labour	Sarah Russell*	1,535	56.4	
Conservative	Nigel Geddes	494	18.1	
Conservative	Ezra McGowan	492	18.1	
Green	Simon Gray	407	14.9	
Conservative	Nathan Cruddas	401	14.7	
Liberal Democrats	Maria Storey	181	6.6	
Liberal Democrats	Simon Kirkham	173	6.4	
Liberal Democrats	Paul Waide	134	4.9	
Independent	A-Lot Oink	91	3.3	
Majority				
Turnout		2,723	25.1	
Labour win (new boundaries)				
Labour win (new boundaries)				
Labour win (new boundaries)				

=== Old Moat ===
Old Moat (3)
Party	Candidate	Votes	%	±%
Labour	Suzannah Reeves*	2,165	71.5	
Labour	Gavin White	2,086	68.8	
Labour	Garry Bridges*	2,071	68.3	
Green	Bonnie Boulton	502	16.6	
Liberal Democrats	Jon Martin	425	14.0	
Liberal Democrats	Brigitte Sapriel	363	12.0	
Liberal Democrats	Andrew McGuinness	359	11.8	
Conservative	Luke Dyks	191	6.3	
Conservative	Nicola Dixon	181	6.0	
Conservative	Michael Lister-Geddes	179	5.9	
Majority				
Turnout		3,030	27.8	
Labour win (new boundaries)				
Labour win (new boundaries)				
Labour win (new boundaries)				

=== Piccadilly ===
Piccadilly (3)
Party	Candidate	Votes	%	±%
Labour	Adele Douglas	925	61.0	
Labour	Jon-Connor Lyons	875	57.7	
Labour	Sam Wheeler	793	52.3	
Green	Kara Ng	368	24.3	
Liberal Democrats	Martin Browne	348	23.0	
Liberal Democrats	Joe Lynch	334	22.0	
Liberal Democrats	Matthew Varnam	250	16.5	
Conservative	Paul Wan	140	9.2	
Conservative	Victoria Williams	124	8.2	
Conservative	Levi Walker	115	7.6	
Majority		425	28.0	
Rejected ballots		6	0.40	
Turnout		1,516	20.08	
Registered electors		7,550		
Labour win (new seat)				
Labour win (new seat)				
Labour win (new seat)				

=== Rusholme ===
Rusholme (3)
Party	Candidate	Votes	%	±%
Labour	Rabnawaz Akbar*	2,484	74.3	
Labour	Jill Lovecy*	2,433	72.8	
Labour	Ahmed Ali*	2,416	72.3	
Green	George Salomon	416	12.5	
Liberal Democrats	Holly Matthies	269	8.1	
Liberal Democrats	Abu Chowdhury	263	7.9	
Liberal Democrats	Dave Page	237	7.1	
Conservative	Mehreen Qazi	161	4.8	
Conservative	Amir Moore	142	4.3	
Conservative	Roozbeh Sarkohaki	96	2.9	
Majority				
Turnout		3,341	27.2	
Labour win (new boundaries)				
Labour win (new boundaries)				
Labour win (new boundaries)				

=== Sharston ===
Sharston (3)
Party	Candidate	Votes	%	±%
Labour	Tommy Judge*	1,555	68.1	
Labour	Maddy Monaghan*	1,486	65.1	
Labour	Hugh Barrett*	1,399	61.3	
Conservative	Eric Houghton	393	17.2	
Conservative	Amandeep Kaur	260	11.4	
Conservative	Sukhjinder Mehat	231	10.1	
Green	Richard Venes	217	9.5	
Liberal Democrats	Sally Ashe	141	6.2	
Liberal Democrats	Hermione Warr	129	5.7	
Liberal Democrats	Asad Osman	82	3.6	
Majority				
Turnout		2,283	19.8	
Labour win (new boundaries)				
Labour win (new boundaries)				
Labour win (new boundaries)				

=== Whalley Range ===
Whalley Range (3)
Party	Candidate	Votes	%	±%
Labour	Aftab Razaq*	2,483	60.4	
Labour	Mary Watson*	2,379	57.9	
Labour	Angeliki Stogia*	2,327	56.6	
Green	Issy Patience	1,414	34.4	
Green	Matt Schriebke	958	23.3	
Green	Stephanie Wyatt	885	21.5	
Conservative	Amber Lister-Geddes	140	3.4	
Conservative	James Ranger	137	3.3	
Liberal Democrats	Jane McQueen	136	3.3	
Liberal Democrats	Samantha Magill	130	3.2	
Conservative	Lee McGrath	128	3.1	
Liberal Democrats	Mark Smith	81	2.0	
Majority		1,069	25.6	
Turnout		4,111	36.9	
Labour win (new boundaries)				
Labour win (new boundaries)				
Labour win (new boundaries)				

=== Withington ===
Withington (3)
Party	Candidate	Votes	%	±%
Labour	Rebecca Moore*	1,987	58.9	
Labour Co-op	Chris Wills*	1,656	49.1	
Labour Co-op	Chris Paul*	1,577	46.8	
Liberal Democrats	April Preston	1,112	33.0	
Liberal Democrats	Alex Warren	1,026	30.4	
Liberal Democrats	Phil Manktelow	1,014	30.1	
Green	Adam King	519	15.4	
Conservative	Shaden Jaradat	154	4.6	
Conservative	Peter Harrop	149	4.4	
Conservative	Avigail Walker	116	3.4	
Majority		465	13.8	
Rejected ballots		12 (full); 2 (partial)		
Turnout		3,372	30.5	
Registered electors		11,057		
Labour win (new boundaries)				
Labour Co-op win (new boundaries)				
Labour Co-op win (new boundaries)				

=== Woodhouse Park ===
Woodhouse Park (3)
Party	Candidate	Votes	%	±%
Labour	Sarah Judge*	1,336	67.3	
Labour	Brian O'Neil*	1,285	64.7	
Labour	Edward Newman*	1,246	62.7	
Conservative	Heath Collinson	349	17.6	
Conservative	David McGrath	296	14.9	
Conservative	Ken Wedderburn	286	14.4	
Green	Chris Waldon	145	7.3	
Liberal Democrats	Anna Hablak	99	5.0	
Liberal Democrats	Helen Shaw	92	4.6	
Liberal Democrats	Martha O'Donoghue	86	4.3	
Majority				
Turnout		1,986	18	
Labour win (new boundaries)				
Labour win (new boundaries)				
Labour win (new boundaries)				
