= 2010 Manchester City Council election =

2010 UK local government election

- 6 May 2010

32 of 96 seats to Manchester City Council 49 seats needed for a majority
	First party	Second party	Third party
Leader	Richard Leese	Simon Ashley	Faraz Bhatti
Party	Labour	Liberal Democrats	Conservative
Leader's seat	Crumpsall	Gorton South	Whalley Range
Last election	19 seats, 43.0%	13 seats, 30.4%	0 seats, 14.2%
Seats before	62	33	1
Seats won	23	9	0
Seats after	62	33	1
Seat change	Steady	Steady	Steady
Popular vote	83,258	57,309	21,712
Percentage	46.4%	32.0%	12.1%
Swing	▲3.4%	▲1.6%	▼2.1%
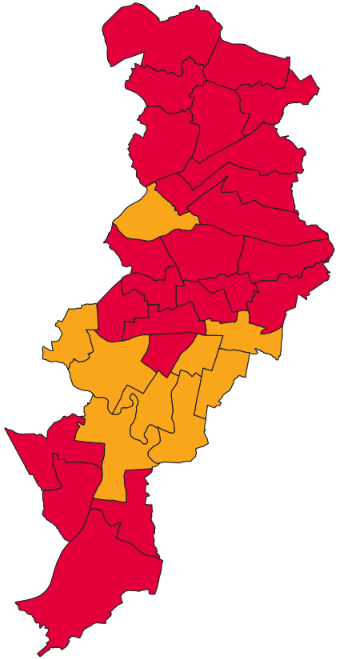
- Map of results of 2010 election
Leader of the Council before election
Richard Leese
Labour
Leader of the Council after election
Richard Leese
Labour

Elections to Manchester City Council were held on 6 May 2010, on the same day as the 2010 UK General Election. One-third of the council was up for election, with each successful candidate to serve a four-year term of office, expiring in 2014. Since the election there had been a further defection from the Liberal Democrats to Labour. Labour held overall control of the council, on a high turnout - owing to the general election on the same day - of 50.9%.

== Election result ==
Party	Votes		Seats			Full Council	
Labour Party	83,258 (46.4%)	▲3.4	23 (71.9%)	23 / 32	Steady	62 (64.6%)	62 / 96
Liberal Democrats	57,309 (32.0%)	▲1.6	9 (28.1%)	9 / 32	Steady	33 (34.4%)	33 / 96
Conservative Party	21,712 (12.1%)	▼2.1	0 (0.0%)	0 / 32	Steady	1 (1.0%)	1 / 96
Green Party	8,589 (4.8%)	▼3.5	0 (0.0%)	0 / 32	Steady	0 (0.0%)	0 / 96
BNP	4,274 (1.9%)	▲0.5	0 (0.0%)	0 / 32	Steady	0 (0.0%)	0 / 96
Respect	1,830 (1.0%)	▲0.4	0 (0.0%)	0 / 32	Steady	0 (0.0%)	0 / 96
UKIP	1,658 (0.9%)	▲0.5	0 (0.0%)	0 / 32	Steady	0 (0.0%)	0 / 96
Independent	399 (0.2%)	N/A	0 (0.0%)	0 / 32	N/A	0 (0.0%)	0 / 96
TUSC	223 (0.1%)	N/A	0 (0.0%)	0 / 32	N/A	0 (0.0%)	0 / 96
Libertarian	55 (0.0%)	N/A	0 (0.0%)	0 / 32	N/A	0 (0.0%)	0 / 96

↓
62	33	1

== Ward results ==
=== Ancoats and Clayton ===
Ancoats and Clayton
Party	Candidate	Votes	%	±%
Labour Co-op	Jim Battle*	2,845	54.8	−4.9
Liberal Democrats	Claude Diele Nsumbu	1,265	24.4	+7.5
Conservative	Michael Noel Liffen	678	13.1	+0.9
Green	Peter Dexter Birkinshaw	404	7.8	−1.7
Majority		1580	30.4	−12.5
Turnout		5192	46.1	+22.7
Labour hold		Swing	-6.2	

=== Ardwick ===
Ardwick
Party	Candidate	Votes	%	±%
Labour	Mavis Smitheman*	2,581	58.3	−3.8
Liberal Democrats	Asad Osman	1,112	25.1	+6.9
Conservative	Andrew Paul Hartley	463	10.5	−1.1
Green	Patrick Thomas Sudlow	271	6.1	−1.9
Majority		1,469	33.2	−10.8
Turnout		4,427	39.0	+21.1
Labour hold		Swing	-5.3	

=== Baguley ===
Baguley
Party	Candidate	Votes	%	±%
Labour Co-op	Eddie McCulley*	2,263	47.1	+0.4
Liberal Democrats	Diane Patricia Bennett	1,178	24.5	+14.4
Conservative	Ralph Ellerton	777	16.2	−7.3
UKIP	Eugene Cassidy	329	6.8	+6.8
Green	Ethne Quinn	134	2.8	−4.6
Socialist	Lynn Worthington	128	2.7	−9.6
Majority		1,085	22.6	−0.6
Turnout		4,809	44.9	+22.0
Labour hold		Swing	-7.0	

=== Bradford ===
Bradford
Party	Candidate	Votes	%	±%
Labour	John Longsden*	2,890	63.9	−3.2
Liberal Democrats	Sarah McCulloch	906	20.0	+6.9
Conservative	Adam Shaw	513	11.3	+1.1
Green	Andrew James Bullen	214	4.7	−4.9
Majority		1,984	43.9	−10.1
Turnout		4,523	42.1	+20.1
Labour hold		Swing	-5.0	

=== Brooklands ===
Brooklands
Party	Candidate	Votes	%	±%
Labour	Sue Murphy*	2,633	46.2	+2.0
Conservative	Marie Raynor	1,534	26.9	−11.5
Liberal Democrats	Peter James Maxson	1,061	18.6	+6.0
UKIP	Pam Shotton	298	5.2	+5.2
Green	Elaine Brown	167	2.9	−2.2
Majority		1,099	19.3	+13.5
Turnout		5,693	55.4	+26.8
Labour hold		Swing	+6.7	

=== Burnage ===
Burnage
Party	Candidate	Votes	%	±%
Liberal Democrats	William David Fisher	2,735	45.4	−19.4
Labour	Carl Jason Austin	2,552	42.4	+18.7
Conservative	Peter Malcolm Schofield	489	8.1	+1.0
Green	Dan Collinson	243	4.0	−0.4
Majority		183	3.0	−38.1
Turnout		6,019	57.6	+26.6
Liberal Democrats hold		Swing	-19.0	

=== Charlestown ===
Charlestown
Party	Candidate	Votes	%	±%
Labour	Veronica Kirkpatrick*	2,828	54.6	+8.6
BNP	Stephen Moran	802	15.5	−8.3
Conservative	Philip Steven Donohue	749	14.5	−0.2
Liberal Democrats	Andrew Hardwick-Moss	673	13.0	+6.8
Green	Michael Prior	127	2.5	−3.9
Majority		2,026	39.1	+16.9
Turnout		5179	51.2	+21.4
Labour hold		Swing	+8.4	

=== Cheetham ===
Cheetham
Party	Candidate	Votes	%	±%
Labour	Naeem-Ul Hassan*	3,451	53.8	+3.9
Conservative	Imran Raza Rizvi	1,433	22.3	+3.0
Liberal Democrats	Liaqat Ali	929	14.5	+2.2
Respect	Kay Phillips	607	9.5	−4.9
Majority		2,018	31.4	+0.9
Turnout		6,420	47.9	+18.7
Labour hold		Swing	+0.4	

=== Chorlton ===
Chorlton
Party	Candidate	Votes	%	±%
Liberal Democrats	Victor Max Mark Chamberlain	3,349	43.6	+3.9
Labour	Amina Lone	2,981	38.8	−6.4
Green	Brian Arthur Candeland	825	10.7	+1.2
Conservative	Saira Hanif	522	6.8	+1.3
Majority		368	4.8	−0.7
Turnout		7,677	72.5	+26.5
Liberal Democrats gain from Labour		Swing	+5.1	

=== Chorlton Park ===
Chorlton Park
Party	Candidate	Votes	%	±%
Liberal Democrats	Norman Lewis*	3,605	53.3	−0.1
Labour	Ian Hyde	2,193	32.4	+8.4
Conservative	Mohammed Afzal	524	7.8	−3.5
Green	James Alden	439	6.5	−4.8
Majority		1,412	20.9	−8.4
Turnout		6,761	63.9	+33.4
Liberal Democrats hold		Swing	-4.2	

=== City Centre ===
City Centre
Party	Candidate	Votes	%	±%
Liberal Democrats	Elaine Boyes*	2,080	40.6	+4.5
Labour	Anthony McCaul	1,610	31.5	+1.0
Conservative	Yan Zhang	1,106	21.6	−3.0
Green	Iain Hepworth	323	6.3	−2.5
Majority		470	9.2	+3.5
Turnout		5,119	43.0	+28.0
Liberal Democrats hold		Swing	+1.7	

=== Crumpsall ===
Crumpsall
Party	Candidate	Votes	%	±%
Labour	Jon-Leigh Pritchard*	3,179	57.9	+1.4
Conservative	Shamin Raja Akhtar	924	16.8	−2.2
Liberal Democrats	Mo Saqib	669	12.2	+0.9
UKIP	Rob Willescroft	394	7.2	+0.6
Respect	Madaser Anwar	321	7.2	+7.2
Majority		2,255	41.1	+3.6
Turnout		5,487	52.3	+22.3
Labour hold		Swing	+1.8	

=== Didsbury East ===
Didsbury East
Party	Candidate	Votes	%	±%
Liberal Democrats	Andrew Taylor	3,364	46.7	−5.8
Labour	Andrew Simcock	2,622	36.4	+9.4
Conservative	Asad Khan	806	11.2	−1.4
Green	Gerry Gee	419	5.8	−2.1
Majority		742	10.3	−15.2
Turnout		7,211	68.8	+30.8
Liberal Democrats hold		Swing	-7.6	

=== Didsbury West ===
Didsbury West
Party	Candidate	Votes	%	±%
Liberal Democrats	Mark Clayton*	3,088	50.2	+3.0
Labour	David Clive Ellison	1,978	32.2	+9.4
Conservative	David Michael Bean	1,086	17.7	+1.1
Majority		1,110	18.0	−6.4
Turnout		6,152	61.4	+33.6
Liberal Democrats hold		Swing	-3.2	

=== Fallowfield ===
Fallowfield
Party	Candidate	Votes	%	±%
Labour Co-op	Mike Amesbury*	2,534	48.0	−3.4
Liberal Democrats	Dave Page	1,716	32.5	+4.4
Conservative	Nick Kling	746	14.1	+2.6
Green	Daniel Benjamin Lee	286	5.4	−3.6
Majority		818	15.5	−7.9
Turnout		5,282	50.3	+27.5
Labour hold		Swing	-3.9	

=== Gorton North ===
Gorton North
Party	Candidate	Votes	%	±%
Labour	Nilofar Siddiqi*	2,356	46.3	+8.0
Liberal Democrats	Rob Copeland	2,046	40.2	−8.5
Conservative	Jean Mee	475	9.3	+1.3
Green	Karl Wardlaw	213	4.2	−0.8
Majority		310	6.1	−4.2
Turnout		5,090	46.4	+18.9
Labour hold		Swing	+8.2	

=== Gorton South ===
Gorton South
Party	Candidate	Votes	%	±%
Labour	Julie Reid	2,737	45.9	+11.4
Liberal Democrats	John Bridges*	2,529	42.4	−0.4
Conservative	William Lawrence Clapham	426	7.1	−0.3
Respect	Marie-Angelique Bueler	270	4.5	+4.5
Majority		208	3.5	−4.8
Turnout		5,962	49.8	+24.6
Labour gain from Liberal Democrats		Swing	+5.9	

=== Harpurhey ===
Harpurhey
Party	Candidate	Votes	%	±%
Labour	Paul Fairweather*	3,054	60.0	+2.7
Liberal Democrats	Andi Sidwell	684	13.4	+1.1
BNP	Peter Brown	627	12.3	+12.3
Conservative	Martin James Rosen	587	11.5	−7.9
Green	Arteth Jean Gray	141	2.8	−8.2
Majority		2,370	46.5	+8.6
Turnout		5,093	42.1	+21.0
Labour hold		Swing	+0.8	

=== Higher Blackley ===
Higher Blackley
Party	Candidate	Votes	%	±%
Labour	Anna Trotman*	3,037	56.6	+12.8
Conservative	Vivienne Inez Clarke	820	15.3	−0.1
BNP	Derek George Adams	813	15.2	−12.1
Liberal Democrats	Nicholas Renaud-Komiya	581	10.8	+2.6
Respect	Paul Kelly	111	2.1	+2.1
Majority		2,217	41.3	+24.8
Turnout		5,362	52.0	+21.7
Labour hold		Swing	+6.4	

=== Hulme ===
Hulme
Party	Candidate	Votes	%	±%
Labour	Nigel Joseph Murphy*	2,445	45.8	+3.6
Liberal Democrats	Ian James Kimpton	1,229	23.0	+14.7
Green	Gayle Simms O'Donnovan	1,172	22.0	−18.0
Conservative	Amjad Nasir	490	9.2	−0.2
Majority		1,216	22.8	+20.6
Turnout		5,336	46.3	+24.6
Labour hold		Swing	-5.5	

=== Levenshulme ===
Levenshulme
Party	Candidate	Votes	%	±%
Liberal Democrats	James Hennigan	2,546	41.7	−14.0
Labour	Aftab Ahmed	2,340	38.3	+12.3
Green	David William Mottram	664	10.9	−1.0
Conservative	Rob Manning	556	9.1	+2.7
Majority		206	3.4	−26.3
Turnout		6,106	56.7	+30.0
Liberal Democrats hold		Swing	-13.1	

=== Longsight ===
Longsight
Party	Candidate	Votes	%	±%
Labour	Suzanne Richards	2,639	49.1	−12.5
Liberal Democrats	Jawaid Iqbal Chaudhry	2,101	39.1	+12.7
Conservative	Tahir Mahmood Khan	351	6.5	+1.8
Respect	Martin Lambert	282	5.2	+5.2
Majority		538	10.0	−25.3
Turnout		5,373	52.9	+17.6
Labour hold		Swing	-12.6	

=== Miles Platting and Newton Heath ===
Miles Platting and Newton Heath
Party	Candidate	Votes	%	±%
Labour	John Flanagan*	2,402	50.1	+10.6
Liberal Democrats	Gerry Diamond	1,596	33.3	−12.3
BNP	John O'Shaughnessy	400	8.3	+0.4
Conservative	Sheraz Sherazi	265	5.5	+0.9
Green	Christopher Hyland	80	1.7	−0.9
Libertarian	Stuart Charles Heal	55	1.1	+1.1
Majority		806	16.8	+11.0
Turnout		4,798	45.8	+14.8
Labour hold		Swing	+11.4	

=== Moss Side ===
Moss Side
Party	Candidate	Votes	%	±%
Labour	Roy Blake Walters*	3,681	65.5	−2.5
Liberal Democrats	Ahmed Samatar	1,160	20.6	+10.1
Conservative	William Stobart	362	6.4	−0.7
Green	Nigel James Woodcock	306	5.4	−3.2
Independent	Colette Williams	109	1.9	+1.9
Majority		2,521	44.9	−12.8
Turnout		5,618	48.9	+24.3
Labour hold		Swing	-6.3	

=== Moston ===
Moston
Party	Candidate	Votes	%	±%
Labour	Rita Tavernor*	2,701	44.0	−5.5
Liberal Democrats	Tim Hartley	1,768	28.8	+16.1
Conservative	Steven Booth	836	13.6	−16.3
BNP	Tony Trebilcock	765	12.5	+12.5
Green	Mosab Musbahi	74	1.2	−6.7
Majority		933	15.2	−4.4
Turnout		6,144	56.0	+27.4
Labour hold		Swing	-10.8	

=== Northenden ===
Northenden
Party	Candidate	Votes	%	±%
Liberal Democrats	Mary Di Mauro	2,503	42.2	−1.6
Labour	Richard James Cowell*	2,478	41.8	−1.8
Conservative	Steve Whittaker	546	9.2	+1.0
BNP	Sarah Anne Barnes	233	3.9	+3.9
UKIP	Michael Kevin Conlan	166	2.8	+2.8
Majority		25	0.4	+0.2
Turnout		5,926	54.4	+20.7
Liberal Democrats gain from Labour		Swing	+0.1	

=== Old Moat ===
Old Moat
Party	Candidate	Votes	%	±%
Labour	Suzannah Mary Reeves	2,531	43.8	−6.7
Liberal Democrats	Rob Mackle	2,216	38.3	+3.9
Conservative	Shaden Jaradat	489	8.5	+1.1
Green	Rowan William Smith	410	7.1	−0.6
Independent	Yasmin Zalzala	133	2.3	+2.3
Majority		315	5.5	−10.6
Turnout		5,779	54.6	+27.8
Labour hold		Swing	-5.3	

=== Rusholme ===
Rusholme
Party	Candidate	Votes	%	±%
Labour	Rabnawaz Akbar	2,259	44.1	+16.9
Liberal Democrats	Tanvir Akhtar	1,885	36.8	−5.9
Conservative	Dola Miah	466	9.1	−2.3
Green	Justine Hall	342	6.7	+0.5
TUSC	Nahella Ashraf	95	1.9	+1.9
Respect	Ali Shelmani	73	1.4	+1.4
Majority		374	7.3	−8.3
Turnout		5,120	51.3	+25.6
Labour gain from Liberal Democrats		Swing	+11.4	

=== Sharston ===
Sharston
Party	Candidate	Votes	%	±%
Labour Co-op	Hugh Barrett*	2,335	45.6	−1.6
Conservative	Gregory Barrie Davis	933	18.2	−14.5
Liberal Democrats	Francesca Bliss	930	18.2	+6.6
BNP	Bernard Todd	371	7.2	+7.2
UKIP	Robert Edward Burke	283	5.5	+5.5
Independent	Jimmy McCullough	157	3.1	+3.1
Green	Luke Smith	114	2.2	−6.2
Majority		1,402	27.4	+13.7
Turnout		5,123	44.4	+23.3
Labour hold		Swing	+6.4	

=== Whalley Range ===
Whalley Range
Party	Candidate	Votes	%	±%
Labour	Mary Rose Watson*	3,137	46.5	+16.8
Liberal Democrats	Mohammed Sajjad	2,330	34.6	−4.7
Green	Mary Rosalind Candeland	556	8.2	−0.7
Conservative	Sophia Fox-Miles	552	8.2	−13.9
Respect	Mohammed Zulfikar	166	2.5	+2.5
Majority		807	12.0	+2.4
Turnout		6,741	61.4	+20.9
Labour hold		Swing	+10.7	

=== Withington ===
Withington
Party	Candidate	Votes	%	±%
Liberal Democrats	Simon David Wheale*	2,849	51.4	−6.3
Labour Co-op	Chris Paul	1,558	28.1	+5.0
Conservative	Shumaila Malik	600	10.8	+1.7
Green	Laura Alice Bannister	534	9.6	−0.6
Majority		1,291	23.3	−11.2
Turnout		5,541	50.6	+30.0
Liberal Democrats hold		Swing	-5.6	

=== Woodhouse Park ===
Woodhouse Park
Party	Candidate	Votes	%	±%
Labour	Edward Newman*	2,428	57.9	−2.7
Liberal Democrats	Hannah Roberts	626	14.9	+6.7
Conservative	Stephen John Heath	608	14.5	−8.9
BNP	Robin Wayne Sharman	263	6.3	+6.3
UKIP	Christopher James Cassidy	188	4.5	+4.5
Green	May Molteno	77	1.8	−6.1
Majority		1,802	43.0	+5.6
Turnout		4,190	42.2	+21.4
Labour hold		Swing	-4.7	

== By-elections between 2010 and 2011 ==
Hulme By-Election 4 November 2010
Party	Candidate	Votes	%	±%
Labour	Amina Lone	1,031	60.6	+14.8
Green	Deyika Nzeribe	451	26.5	+4.5
Liberal Democrats	Grace Baynham	151	8.9	−14.1
Conservative	Will Stobart	67	3.9	−5.3
Majority		580	34.1	+11.3
Turnout		1,700	10.9	−35.4
Labour hold		Swing	+5.1	

Baguley By-Election 20 January 2011
Party	Candidate	Votes	%	±%
Labour	Tracey Rawlins	996	70.8	+23.7
Conservative	Ralph Ellerton	160	11.4	−4.8
UKIP	Christopher Cassidy	76	5.4	−1.4
Liberal Democrats	Yvonne Donaghey	52	3.7	−20.8
BNP	Bernard Todd	52	3.7	+3.7
Green	Mike Dagley	51	3.6	−0.8
Independent	Honor Donnelly	19	1.4	+1.4
Majority		836	59.5	+36.9
Turnout		1,406	12.9	−32.0
Labour hold		Swing	+14.2	
