= 2015 Manchester City Council election =

2015 local election in England

Manchester City Council Elections, 2015
- 7 May 2015

32 of 96 seats (One Third) to Manchester City Council 49 seats needed for a majority
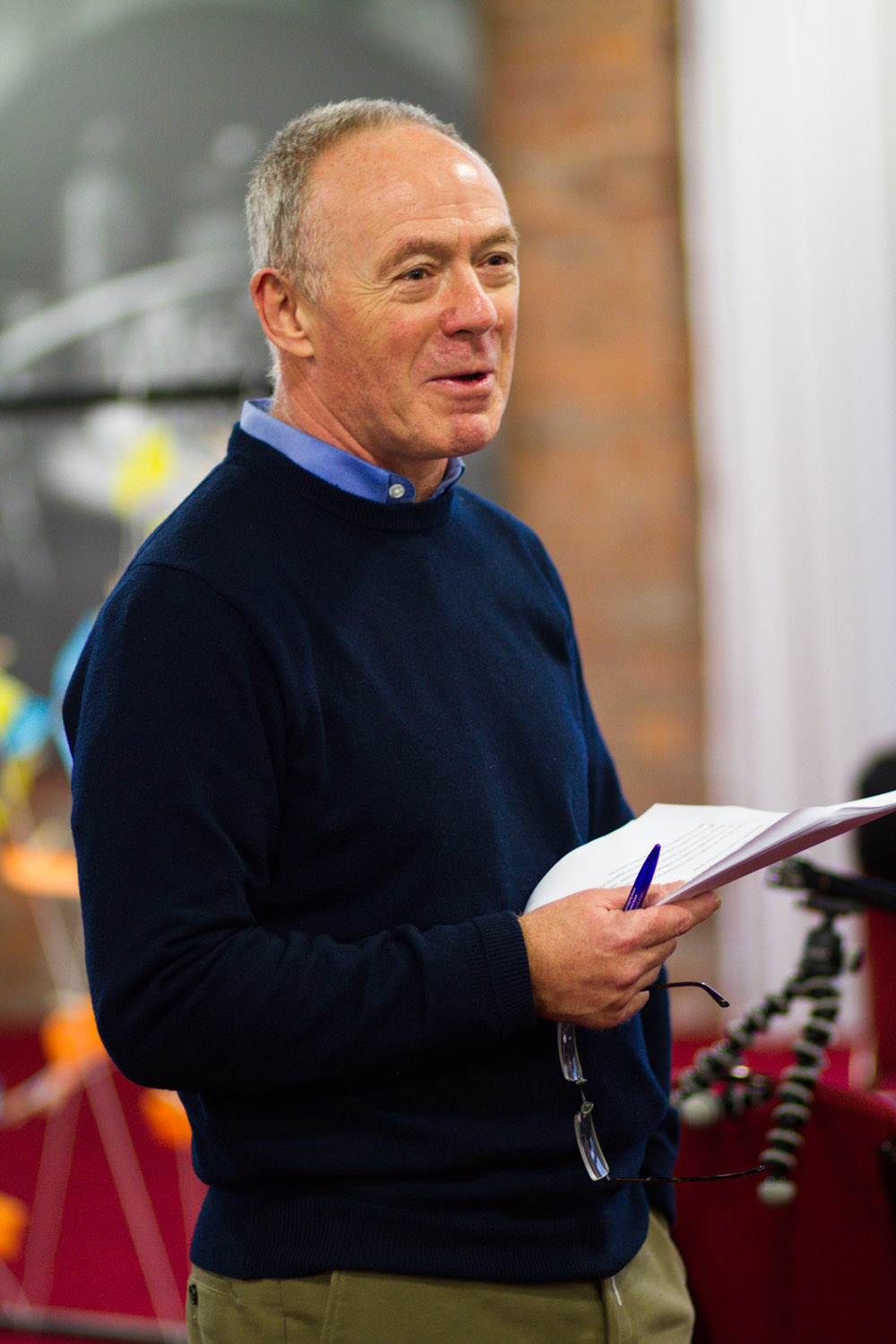
	First party
Leader	Richard Leese
Party	Labour
Leader since	20 May 1996
Leader's seat	Crumpsall
Last election	32 seats, 62.4%
Seats won	32
Seat change	Steady
Popular vote	116,634
Percentage	58.70%
Swing	▲0.89%
Leader of Largest Party before election
Richard Leese
Labour
Subsequent Leader of Largest Party
Richard Leese
Labour

Map of the results of the 2015 Manchester council election, with Labour in red.

Elections to Manchester City Council were held on 7 May 2015, along with the 2015 United Kingdom general election. One third of the council was up for election, with each successful candidate serving a three-year term of office, expiring in 2018, due to planned boundary changes. The Labour Party retained overall control of the council, managing to hold every seat contested.

== Results summary ==
Changes in vote share are compared to the 2014 election.

Manchester City Council Election Result 2015
Party	This election			Full council			This election		
Party	Seats	Net	Seats %	Other	Total	Total %	Votes	Votes %	+/−
Labour	32/32	▲1	100.0	64	96	100.0	116,634	58.70	▲0.77
Green	0/32	Steady	0.0	0	0	0.0	22,875	11.51	▼1.01
Conservative	0/32	Steady	0.0	0	0	0.0	21,558	10.85	▲2.95
Liberal Democrats	0/31	Steady	0.0	0	0	0.0	19,142	9.63	▼1.79
UKIP	0/16	Steady	0.0	0	0	0.0	14,572	7.33	▼0.23
TUSC	0/26	Steady	0.0	0	0	0.0	2,669	1.34	▲0.57
Independent	0/3	Steady	0.0	0	0	0.0	889	0.45	▼0.21
Monster Raving Loony	0/2	Steady	0.0	0	0	0.0	163	0.08	N/A
Christian Democrat Party for a Consensus	0/1	Steady	0.0	0	0	0.0	84	0.04	▼0.01
BNP	0/1	Steady	0.0	0	0	0.0	66	0.03	▼0.45
Communist League	0/2	Steady	0.0	0	0	0.0	34	0.02	N/A
Independent Labour	N/A	▼1	N/A	0	0	0.0	N/A	N/A	N/A

== Ward results ==
=== Ancoats and Clayton ===
Ancoats and Clayton
Party	Candidate	Votes	%	±%
Labour	Mick Loughman*	3,534	52.1	−19.6
Green	Matthew Clark	866	12.8	+0.8
Conservative	Harry George Williams	741	10.9	+1.8
UKIP	Josie Loftus	659	9.7	N/A
Independent	Ken Dobson	546	8.0	N/A
Liberal Democrats	Chris Lovell	342	5.0	−2.2
TUSC	Katie McFarlane	99	1.5	N/A
Majority		2,668	39.3	
Turnout		6,787	48.9	+23.4
Labour hold		Swing		

=== Ardwick ===
Ardwick
Party	Candidate	Votes	%	±%
Labour	Bernard Priest*	3,857	76.6	+0.4
Green	Steffeny McGiffen	546	10.8	N/A
Conservative	Will Coleshill	320	6.4	−2.2
Liberal Democrats	Lucinda Chamberlain	200	4.0	−4.5
TUSC	John Neill	110	2.2	−1.5
Majority		3,311	65.8	
Turnout		5,033	50.3	+28.7
Labour hold		Swing		

=== Baguley ===
Baguley
Party	Candidate	Votes	%	±%
Labour Co-op	Paul Gerrard Andrews*	3,099	57.8	−6.8
UKIP	Paul O'Donoughue	1,120	20.9	+12.2
Conservative	Bev Nickson	667	12.4	−1.0
Green	Frank John Clements	232	4.4	+0.3
Liberal Democrats	Christopher Kane	159	3.0	−1.4
TUSC	Lynn Worthington	81	1.5	−1.3
Majority		1,979	36.9	
Turnout		5,358	48.6	+24.4
Labour Co-op hold		Swing		

=== Bradford ===
Bradford
Party	Candidate	Votes	%	±%
Labour	Rosa May Battle*	4,163	69.1	−9.3
Conservative	Barney Bradley Clarke Watson	804	13.3	+4.3
Green	Rachel Harper	625	10.4	+4.1
Liberal Democrats	Eve Friday	230	3.8	−2.5
TUSC	Alex Powell	97	1.6	N/A
Christian Democrat Party for a Consensus	Jonathan Cox	84	1.4	N/A
Communist League	Catharina Eva Gunela Tirsen	21	0.4	N/A
Majority		659	55.8	
Turnout		6,024	48.5	+23.4
Labour hold		Swing		

=== Brooklands ===
Brooklands
Party	Candidate	Votes	%	±%
Labour	Sue Cooley*	3,136	52.2	−5.7
Conservative	Stephen Paul Woods	1,363	22.8	−0.8
UKIP	Pat Bebby	1,044	17.4	+9.6
Liberal Democrats	Philip Andrew Stubbs	243	4.0	−2.2
Green	Calum Thomson Wiggle	217	3.6	−0.8
Majority		1,773	29.4	
Turnout		6,003	55.7	+25.0
Labour hold		Swing		

=== Burnage ===
Burnage
Party	Candidate	Votes	%	±%
Labour	Carl Jason Austin*	4,010	60.9	−2.1
Liberal Democrats	Maria Theresa Turner	1,235	18.8	−7.2
Green	Sam Darby	815	12.4	+6.3
Conservative	Shahed Hossain	524	8.0	+3.3
Majority		2,775	42.1	
Turnout		6,584	60.2	+20.4
Labour hold		Swing		

=== Charlestown ===
Charlestown
Party	Candidate	Votes	%	±%
Labour	Basil Curley*	3,053	56.4	−14.6
UKIP	Neil Caradoc Griffiths	1,464	27.1	N/A
Conservative	Joshua John Lelliott	549	10.1	−2.4
Green	Astrid Johnson	178	3.3	N/A
Liberal Democrats	William David Fisher	112	2.1	−2.3
TUSC	Alex Wogan	54	1.0	N/A
Majority		1,589	29.3	
Turnout		5,410	52.4	+22.0
Labour hold		Swing		

=== Cheetham ===
Cheetham
Party	Candidate	Votes	%	±%
Labour	Julie Connolly	5,894	78.5	−5.9
Conservative	Peter Malcolm Schofield	783	10.4	+2.1
Green	Anne Vivienne Power	534	7.1	N/A
Liberal Democrats	Arthur Craig Whittall	197	2.6	−4.7
TUSC	Sam Gleaden	102	1.4	N/A
Majority		5,111	68.1	
Turnout		7,510	48.6	+18.4
Labour hold		Swing		

=== Chorlton ===
Chorlton
Party	Candidate	Votes	%	±%
Labour	Matt Strong*	3,991	48.5	−5.1
Liberal Democrats	Matt Gallagher	1,618	19.7	−11.0
Green	Jake Welsh	1,610	19.5	+7.8
Conservative	Colm George Lock	600	7.3	+3.3
Independent	Mary Rosalind Crumpton	233	2.8	N/A
TUSC	Liam Curless	180	2.2	N/A
Majority		2,373	28.8	
Turnout		8,232	73.8	+23.1
Labour hold		Swing		

=== Chorlton Park ===
Chorlton Park
Party	Candidate	Votes	%	±%
Labour	Dave Rawson	3,378	42.5	−5.9
Liberal Democrats	Norman Lewis	2,505	31.6	−1.3
Green	Hannah Lisa Richmond	1,282	16.1	+4.7
Conservative	William Stobart	780	9.8	+2.6
Majority		873	10.9	
Turnout		7,945	67.5	+28.6
Labour hold		Swing		

=== City Centre ===
City Centre
Party	Candidate	Votes	%	±%
Labour Co-op	Kevin Peel*	2,236	42.5	+5.8
Conservative	Nicholas David StJohn Savage	1,380	26.2	+11.3
Green	Hayley Lesley Flynn	987	18.7	+9.3
Liberal Democrats	Matthew Lee Adams	524	10.0	−6.1
UKIP	Myles Power	136	2.6	N/A
Majority		856	16.3	
Turnout		5,263	51.6	+30.3
Labour Co-op hold		Swing		

=== Crumpsall ===
Crumpsall
Party	Candidate	Votes	%	±%
Labour	Beth Marshall	3,899	65.2	−11.9
UKIP	Bob Willescroft	789	13.2	N/A
Conservative	Sham Raja Akhtar	694	11.6	−2.4
Green	Thomas John Stokes	316	5.3	+1.3
Liberal Democrats	Joel Moorcroft	151	2.5	−2.5
TUSC	Martin Conway	128	2.2	N/A
Majority		3,110	52.0	
Turnout		5,977	52.7	+18.3
Labour hold		Swing		

=== Didsbury East ===
Didsbury East
Party	Candidate	Votes	%	±%
Labour	Andrew George Simcock	3,572	45.4	−5.9
Liberal Democrats	Dominic Hardwick	2,205	28.0	−5.4
Conservative	Robert George Manning	1,008	12.8	+4.0
Green	Rosie Dammers	731	9.3	+3.0
UKIP	Mark Davies	356	4.5	N/A
Majority		1,367	17.4	
Turnout		7,872	70.7	+25.8
Labour hold		Swing		

=== Didsbury West ===
Didsbury West
Party	Candidate	Votes	%	±%
Labour	Dave Ellison*	2,813	40.0	−4.2
Liberal Democrats	Simon Ashley	2,003	28.5	−2.2
Conservative	David Semple	1,053	15.0	+1.1
Green	Arnold James Spencer	886	12.6	+1.5
UKIP	Robert Gutfreund-Walmsley	228	3.2	N/A
TUSC	Alex Longworth-Dunbar	52	0.7	N/A
Majority		810	11.5	
Turnout		7,035	67.0	+30.1
Labour hold		Swing		

=== Fallowfield ===
Fallowfield
Party	Candidate	Votes	%	±%
Labour	Grace Fletcher-Hackwood*	3,617	60.3	−8.8
Green	Laura Alice Bannister	1,367	22.8	+11.6
Conservative	Jack Murray	661	11.0	+0.2
Liberal Democrats	Sarah Louise Brown	269	4.5	−1.7
TUSC	Zoe Brunswick	86	1.4	−1.2
Majority		2,250	37.5	
Turnout		6,000	56.9	+28.3
Labour hold		Swing		

=== Gorton North ===
Gorton North
Party	Candidate	Votes	%	±%
Labour	John Hughes*	3,851	71.1	+10.0
Conservative	Luke Aidan Dyks	591	10.9	+6.3
Green	Karl Wardlaw	469	8.7	+3.9
Liberal Democrats	Dave Page	397	7.3	−22.2
TUSC	Tony Harper	110	2.0	N/A
Majority		3,260	60.2	
Turnout		5,418	48.6	+19.4
Labour hold		Swing		

=== Gorton South ===
Gorton South
Party	Candidate	Votes	%	±%
Labour	Peter David Cookson*	4,564	66.2	+13.9
UKIP	Bob Catterall	996	14.0	N/A
Green	Melvyn Newton	527	7.6	+2.4
Conservative	Tmo Opensan	397	5.8	+2.9
Liberal Democrats	Andrew Peter Hickey	328	4.8	−32.1
TUSC	Dick Brown	110	1.6	N/A
Majority		3,598	58.6	
Turnout		6,892	52.6	+19.4
Labour hold		Swing		

=== Harpurhey ===
Harpurhey
Party	Candidate	Votes	%	±%
Labour	Joanne Mary Green*	3,431	61.8	+11.4
UKIP	Angela Robinson	1,284	23.1	N/A
Conservative	Calum Turud James Davies	455	8.2	−2.7
Green	Christina Amy Alexandra Knox	229	4.1	N/A
Liberal Democrats	Charles William Turner	92	1.6	−3.4
TUSC	Fiona Jane Stephens	65	1.2	N/A
Majority		2,147	38.7	
Turnout		5,556	45.3	+21.1
Labour hold		Swing		

=== Higher Blackley ===
Higher Blackley
Party	Candidate	Votes	%	±%
Labour	John Patrick Farrell	3,155	57.5	−5.8
UKIP	Amelda Agnes Beatrice Bowen	1,414	25.8	N/A
Conservative	Alexandru Stelian Stancu	540	9.8	−2.6
Green	Catriona Joy Brown Watson	231	4.2	+1.6
Liberal Democrats	Richard Gadsden	151	2.7	−0.9
Majority		1,741	31.7	
Turnout		5,491	51.2	+21.6
Labour hold		Swing		

=== Hulme ===
Hulme
Party	Candidate	Votes	%	±%
Labour	Lee-Ann Mary Igbon	3,246	56.3	−1.1
Green	Dayika Nzeribe	1,490	25.9	+0.7
Conservative	Cynthia Kallmunzer	732	12.7	−2.4
UKIP	Phil Eckersley	218	3.8	N/A
TUSC	Conor Price	75	1.3	N/A
Majority		1,756	30.4	
Turnout		5,761	53.3	+29.2
Labour hold		Swing		

=== Levenshulme ===
Levenshulme
Party	Candidate	Votes	%	±%
Labour	Basat Mahmood Sheikh	3,194	49.1	−3.1
Liberal Democrats	John Patrick Bryans Commons	1,298	20.0	−8.4
Green	Dick Venes	1,290	19.9	+5.1
Conservative	Khawar Iqbal	515	7.9	+3.3
TUSC	Fiona Penelope Higgins	202	3.1	N/A
Majority		1,896	29.1	
Turnout		6,499	60.7	+22.8
Labour hold		Swing		

=== Longsight ===
Longsight
Party	Candidate	Votes	%	±%
Labour	Abid Latif Chohan*	4,516	75.9	+3.5
Green	Robyn Forsyth	636	10.7	+2.0
Conservative	Mohammed Afzal	459	7.7	+2.3
Liberal Democrats	Mohammed Sajid	175	3.0	−10.5
Independent	Raees Khan	110	1.8	N/A
TUSC	Nahella Ashraf	52	0.9	N/A
Majority		3,880	65.2	
Turnout		5,948	56.6	+21.1
Labour hold		Swing		

=== Miles Platting and Newton Heath ===
Miles Platting and Newton Heath
Party	Candidate	Votes	%	±%
Labour	June Hitchen*	3,635	73.1	+4.8
Conservative	Harry Kagouras	530	10.7	+7.1
Green	Nathan Rae	350	7.0	+3.4
Liberal Democrats	John Richard Bridges	257	5.2	−13.0
TUSC	Tom Simpson	202	4.0	N/A
Majority		3,105	62.4	
Turnout		4,974	47.4	+19.5
Labour hold		Swing		

=== Moss Side ===
Moss Side
Party	Candidate	Votes	%	±%
Labour	Sameem Ali*	5,286	78.2	−0.9
Green	Muhammed Anwar Osman	563	8.3	−0.2
Conservative	Denis Kostyan	459	6.8	+2.1
Liberal Democrats	Asad Abdi Osman	254	3.7	−4.0
TUSC	Emma Clark	201	3.0	N/A
Majority		4,723	69.9	
Turnout		6,763	54.3	+25.0
Labour hold		Swing		

=== Moston ===
Moston
Party	Candidate	Votes	%	±%
Labour	Paula Elizabeth Appleby	3,153	49.4	−12.7
UKIP	Mike Pattillo	2,001	31.4	N/A
Conservative	Daniel Kallmunzer	729	11.4	−3.3
Green	James Kenneth Thorp	201	3.2	−2.6
Liberal Democrats	Bernadette Ryan	185	2.9	−5.8
BNP	Gareth Black	66	1.0	−7.7
TUSC	Molly Tillett	29	0.5	N/A
Communist League	Andres Alberto Mendoza	13	0.2	N/A
Majority		1,152	18.0	
Turnout		6,377	56.1	+23.6
Labour hold		Swing		

=== Northenden ===
Northenden
Party	Candidate	Votes	%	±%
Labour	Chris Webb	3,288	53.4	+5.3
Conservative	Fiona Mary Green	1,068	17.4	+10.5
UKIP	Ian George Fleming	895	14.5	+10.2
Green	Simon Edge	422	6.9	+2.7
Liberal Democrats	Pablo O'Hana	316	5.1	−26.1
Monster Raving Loony	Lord Cameron of Roundwood	110	1.8	N/A
TUSC	Jack Metcalf	55	0.9	N/A
Majority		2,220	36.0	
Turnout		6,154	54.0	+18.3
Labour hold		Swing		

=== Old Moat ===
Old Moat
Party	Candidate	Votes	%	±%
Labour	Garry Paul Bridges	3,854	57.2	−8.5
Green	Glen Marsden	1,103	16.3	+5.9
Liberal Democrats	April Preston	949	14.1	+2.4
Conservative	Peter Jacques Werner	699	10.4	+1.4
TUSC	Jane E Lee	132	2.0	N/A
Majority		2,751	40.9	
Turnout		6,737	62.4	+30.4
Labour hold		Swing		

=== Rusholme ===
Rusholme
Party	Candidate	Votes	%	±%
Labour	Kate Chappell*	3,796	68.7	+7.4
Green	Vicky Matthews	848	15.4	+6.7
Conservative	Sajid Hussain	463	8.4	+2.6
Liberal Democrats	Abu Mohiuddin Chowdhury	326	5.9	−18.3
TUSC	John McFarlane	90	1.6	N/A
Majority		2,948	53.3	
Turnout		5,523	56.9	+22.8
Labour hold		Swing		

=== Sharston ===
Sharston
Party	Candidate	Votes	%	±%
Labour	Hugh Barrett	3,146	55.9	−7.4
UKIP	Bob Burke	1,128	20.1	+12.5
Conservative	Stephen John Hale	834	14.8	−2.5
Green	Sylvia June Buchan	228	4.1	−0.5
Liberal Democrats	John Yorke-Davenport	175	3.1	−1.6
TUSC	Kate Armitage	63	1.1	−1.3
Monster Raving Loony	Silly Sir Oink-a-lot	53	0.9	N/A
Majority		2,018	35.8	
Turnout		5,627	47.8	+22.7
Labour hold		Swing		

=== Whalley Range ===
Whalley Range
Party	Candidate	Votes	%	±%
Labour	Aftab Razaq*	4,421	60.7	−6.1
Green	Mary Rosalind Candeland	1,607	22.1	+9.5
Liberal Democrats	Rhona Brown	590	8.1	−5.6
Conservative	Amjad Nasir	509	7.0	0
TUSC	Karen Reissmann	160	2.2	N/A
Majority		2,814	38.6	
Turnout		7,287	63.5	+23.1
Labour hold		Swing		

=== Withington ===
Withington
Party	Candidate	Votes	%	±%
Labour Co-op	Chris Paul*	3,032	47.3	+3.5
Liberal Democrats	Simon David Wheale	1,382	21.6	−12.8
Green	Harriet Emilia Pugh	1,272	19.9	+4.7
Conservative	Shaden Jaradat	621	9.6	+3.0
TUSC	Mercedes Caccia Mesorio	102	1.6	N/A
Majority		1,650	25.7	
Turnout		6,409	65.1	+35.3
Labour Co-op hold		Swing		

=== Woodhouse Park ===
Woodhouse Park
Party	Candidate	Votes	%	±%
Labour	Sarah Jayne Judge	2,814	61.4	−11.3
UKIP	Tony Welch	840	18.3	+11.1
Conservative	Stephen McHugh	554	12.1	−0.6
Green	Catherine Victoria Higginson	217	4.7	+0.7
Liberal Democrats	Martina A Dunican	123	2.7	−0.7
TUSC	Rob Mulgan	32	0.7	N/A
Majority		1,974	43.1	
Turnout		4,580	44.0	+19.8
Labour hold		Swing		

== By-elections between 2015 and 2016 ==
=== Higher Blackley: 18 February 2016 ===
Higher Blackley: 18 February 2016
Party	Candidate	Votes	%	±%
Labour	Paula Sadler	1,062	65.3	+7.8
UKIP	Martin Power	308	18.9	−6.9
Conservative	David Semple	130	8.0	−1.8
Liberal Democrats	Peter Matthews	78	4.8	+2.1
Green	Anne Power	40	2.5	−1.7
Pirate	George Walkden	9	0.6	New
Majority		754	46.4	+14.7
Turnout		1,627	15.8	−35.8
Labour hold		Swing		
