= 2011 Manchester City Council election =

2011 UK local government election

- 5 May 2011

33 of 96 seats to Manchester City Council 49 seats needed for a majority
	First party	Second party
Leader	Richard Leese	Simon Ashley
Party	Labour	Liberal Democrats
Leader's seat	Crumpsall	Gorton South (defeated)
Last election	23 seats, 46.4%	9 seats, 32.0%
Seats before	62	32
Seats won	33	0
Seats after	75	21
Seat change	▲13	▼11
Popular vote	70,580	19,586
Percentage	62.4%	17.3%
Swing	▲16.0%	▼14.7%
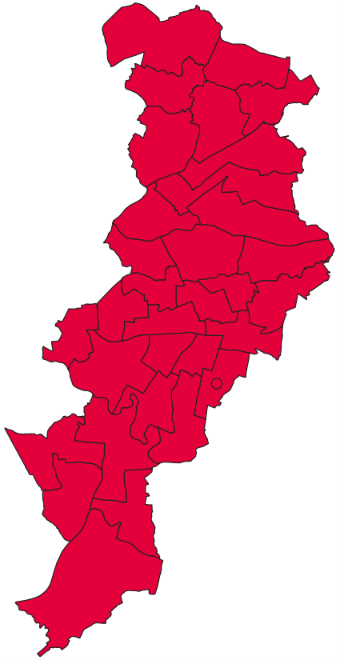
- Map of results of 2011 election
Leader of the Council before election
Richard Leese
Labour
Leader of the Council after election
Richard Leese
Labour

Elections to Manchester City Council were held on 5 May 2011, along with the 2011 United Kingdom Alternative Vote referendum. One third of the council was up for election, with each successful candidate serving a four-year term of office, expiring in 2015. The Labour Party retained overall control of the council, managing to win every seat contested. Overall turnout was a comparatively high 31.6%, although much down on the previous year's general election turnout of 50.9%.

Councillors elected in 2007 were defending their seats this year, and vote share changes are compared on this basis.

== Election result ==
Party	Votes		Seats			Full Council	
Labour Party	70,580 (62.4%)	▲16.0	33 (100.0%)	33 / 33	▲13	75 (78.1%)	75 / 96
Liberal Democrats	19,586 (17.3%)	▼14.7	0 (0.0%)	0 / 33	▼11	21 (21.9%)	21 / 96
Conservative Party	10,216 (9.0%)	▼3.1	0 (0.0%)	0 / 33	Steady	0 (0.0%)	0 / 96
Green Party	8,638 (7.6%)	▲2.8	0 (0.0%)	0 / 33	Steady	0 (0.0%)	0 / 96
BNP	1,514 (1.3%)	▼0.6	0 (0.0%)	0 / 33	Steady	0 (0.0%)	0 / 96
UKIP	1,286 (1.1%)	▲0.2	0 (0.0%)	0 / 33	Steady	0 (0.0%)	0 / 96
Independent	809 (0.7%)	▲0.5	0 (0.0%)	0 / 33	▼2	0 (0.0%)	0 / 96
TUSC	327 (0.3%)	▲0.2	0 (0.0%)	0 / 33	Steady	0 (0.0%)	0 / 96
Respect	111 (0.9%)	▼0.9	0 (0.0%)	0 / 33	Steady	0 (0.0%)	0 / 96
Socialist Equality	82 (0.1%)	N/A	0 (0.0%)	0 / 33	N/A	0 (0.0%)	0 / 96

↓
75	21

== Ward results ==
=== Ancoats and Clayton ===
Ancoats and Clayton
Party	Candidate	Votes	%	±%
Labour	Mick Loughman*	2,202	71.7	+7.1
Green	Peter Birkinshaw	369	12.0	+5.7
Conservative	Abiodun Opesan	278	9.1	+3.4
Liberal Democrats	Claude-Diele Nsumbu	220	7.2	−13.4
Majority		1,833	59.7	
Turnout		3,069	25.5	
Labour hold		Swing	+10.3	

=== Ardwick ===
Ardwick
Party	Candidate	Votes	%	±%
Labour	Bernard Priest*	2,054	76.2	+18.8
Conservative	Robert Manning	232	8.6	+1.3
Liberal Democrats	Liaqat Ali	229	8.5	−16.3
TUSC	James Naish	100	3.7	N/A
Socialist Equality	Robert Skelton	82	3.0	N/A
Majority		1,822	67.6	
Turnout		2,697	21.6	
Labour hold		Swing	+17.6	

=== Baguley ===
Baguley
Party	Candidate	Votes	%	±%
Labour Co-op	Paul Andrews*	1,702	64.6	+12.0
Conservative	Ralph Ellerton	353	13.4	−6.6
UKIP	Christopher Cassidy	229	8.7	N/A
Liberal Democrats	Yvonne Donaghey	115	4.4	−5.3
Green	Mike Dagley	109	4.1	−3.2
TUSC	Lynn Worthington	74	2.8	N/A
Independent	Michael Thompson	50	1.9	N/A
Majority		1,349	51.2	
Turnout		2,633	24.2	
Labour hold		Swing		

=== Bradford ===
Bradford
Party	Candidate	Votes	%	±%
Labour	Rosa Battle*	2,169	78.4	+7.6
Conservative	Sarah Bennett	248	9.0	−0.1
Green	Lorna Bowen	175	6.3	+0.0
Liberal Democrats	Emma Bean	173	6.3	−12.5
Majority		1,921	69.5	
Turnout		2,765	25.1	
Labour hold		Swing	+10.0	

=== Brooklands ===
Brooklands
Party	Candidate	Votes	%	±%
Labour	Sue Cooley*	1,876	57.9	+7.6
Conservative	Stephen Woods	764	23.6	−9.4
UKIP	Nathan Gilbert	254	7.8	N/A
Liberal Democrats	Peter James Maxson	201	6.2	−5.6
Green	Eithne Quinn	143	4.4	−0.4
Majority		1,112	34.3	
Turnout		3,238	30.7	
Labour hold		Swing	+6.6	

=== Burnage ===
Burnage
Party	Candidate	Votes	%	±%
Labour	Carl Austin	2,668	63.0	
Labour	Bev Craig	2,283		
Liberal Democrats	Grace Baynham	1,103	26.0	
Liberal Democrats	Iain Donaldson*	1,005		
Green	Dan Collinson	260	6.1	
Conservative	Jean Mee	203	4.8	
Conservative	Peter Schofield	196		
Majority		1,180	37.0	
Turnout		4,234	39.8	
Labour gain from Liberal Democrats		Swing		
Labour gain from Liberal Democrats		Swing		

=== Charlestown ===
Charlestown
Party	Candidate	Votes	%	±%
Labour	Basil Curley*	2,196	71.0	+12.0
Conservative	Ellen Daniels	387	12.5	−3.5
BNP	Stephen Moran	374	12.1	N/A
Liberal Democrats	Richard Ruddick	137	4.4	−5.9
Majority		1,809	58.5	
Turnout		3,094	30.4	
Labour hold		Swing		

=== Cheetham ===
Cheetham
Party	Candidate	Votes	%	±%
Labour	Afzal Khan*	3,712	84.4	+19.8
Conservative	Samuel Jacobs	366	8.3	−2.2
Liberal Democrats	Nawaz Ahmed	320	7.3	−8.5
Majority		3,346	76.1	
Turnout		4,398	30.2	
Labour hold		Swing		

=== Chorlton ===
Chorlton
Party	Candidate	Votes	%	±%
Labour	Matthew Strong	2,964	53.6	+13.2
Liberal Democrats	Paul Ankers*	1,701	30.7	−10.6
Green	Brian Candeland	647	11.7	−0.6
Conservative	Mohammed Afzal	223	4.0	−2.0
Majority		1,263	22.8	
Turnout		5,535	50.7	
Labour gain from Liberal Democrats		Swing		

=== Chorlton Park ===
Chorlton Park
Party	Candidate	Votes	%	±%
Labour	Ian Hyde	2,098	48.4	+25.0
Liberal Democrats	Tony Bethell*	1,427	32.9	−22.5
Green	Rebecca Willmott	493	11.4	−1.1
Conservative	Henry Hill	313	7.2	−1.6
Majority		671	15.5	
Turnout		4,331	38.9	
Labour gain from Liberal Democrats		Swing		

=== City Centre ===
City Centre
Party	Candidate	Votes	%	±%
Labour Co-op	Kevin Peel	1,048	36.7	+10.9
Independent	Ken Dobson*	656	23.0	N/A
Liberal Democrats	John Bridges	459	16.1	−16.7
Conservative	Michael Liffen	427	14.9	−7.7
Green	Joanne Wilkes	268	9.4	−1.9
Majority		392	13.7	
Turnout		2,858	21.3	
Labour gain from Independent		Swing		

=== Crumpsall ===
Crumpsall
Party	Candidate	Votes	%	±%
Labour	Con Keegan*	2,754	77.1	+17.0
Conservative	Sham Akhtar	500	14.0	−4.5
Liberal Democrats	Ben Fearn	177	5.0	−8.1
Green	Pratichi Chatterjee	142	4.0	−4.3
Majority		2,254	63.1	
Turnout		3,573	33.4	
Labour hold		Swing		

=== Didsbury East ===
Didsbury East
Party	Candidate	Votes	%	±%
Labour	Andrew Simcock	2,465	51.5	+19.3
Liberal Democrats	Helen Fisher*	1,598	33.4	−12.5
Conservative	Christopher Green	423	8.8	−4.2
Green	Kathleen Matthews	303	6.3	−2.6
Majority		867	18.1	
Turnout		4,789	44.9	
Labour gain from Liberal Democrats		Swing		

=== Didsbury West ===
Didsbury West
Party	Candidate	Votes	%	±%
Labour	David Ellison	1,686	44.2	+19.7
Liberal Democrats	Craig Whittall	1,172	30.7	−15.0
Conservative	Jonathan Millard	530	13.9	−0.4
Green	James Alden	424	11.1	−2.3
Majority		514	13.5	
Turnout		3,812	36.9	
Labour gain from Liberal Democrats		Swing		

=== Fallowfield ===
Fallowfield
Party	Candidate	Votes	%	±%
Labour	Grace Fletcher-Hackwood	2,167	69.1	+13.2
Green	Rebecca Simpson	351	11.2	−0.4
Conservative	Nick Kling	340	10.8	+0.2
Liberal Democrats	Saira Sadaf	196	6.2	−15.8
TUSC	Katen Verma	83	2.6	N/A
Majority		1,816	57.9	
Turnout		3,137	28.6	
Labour hold		Swing		

=== Gorton North ===
Gorton North
Party	Candidate	Votes	%	±%
Labour	John Hughes	2,001	61.1	+20.4
Liberal Democrats	Wendy Helsby*	965	29.5	−22.8
Green	Karl Wardlaw	157	4.8	+1.6
Conservative	Yemi Komolafe	150	4.6	+0.8
Majority		1,036	31.7	
Turnout		3,273	29.2	
Labour gain from Liberal Democrats		Swing		

=== Gorton South ===
Gorton South
Party	Candidate	Votes	%	±%
Labour	Peter Cookson	2,162	52.3	+14.8
Liberal Democrats	Simon Ashley*	1,525	36.9	−15.2
Green	Sean Hughes	217	5.2	+0.8
Conservative	Taiwo Tmo	121	2.9	−1.3
Respect	Marie-Angelique Bueler	111	2.7	N/A
Majority		637	15.4	
Turnout		4,136	33.2	
Labour gain from Liberal Democrats		Swing		

=== Harpurhey ===
Harpurhey
Party	Candidate	Votes	%	±%
Labour	Joanne Green*	2,151	73.2	+14.3
Conservative	William Clapham	321	10.9	−0.7
BNP	Peter Brown	320	10.9	N/A
Liberal Democrats	Dominic Hardwick	147	5.0	−9.0
Majority		1,830	62.3	
Turnout		2,939	24.2	
Labour hold		Swing		

=== Higher Blackley ===
Higher Blackley
Party	Candidate	Votes	%	±%
Labour	Harry Lyons*	1,953	63.3	+14.9
Conservative	Vivienne Clarke	381	12.4	+0.0
BNP	Derek Adams	321	10.4	−13.5
UKIP	Martin Power	235	7.6	+4.9
Liberal Democrats	Michael Lau	112	3.6	−5.4
Green	Nick Good	81	2.6	−1.0
Majority		1,572	51.0	
Turnout		3,083	29.6	
Labour hold		Swing		

=== Hulme ===
Hulme
Party	Candidate	Votes	%	±%
Labour	Mary Murphy*	1,689	57.4	−5.4
Green	Ruth Bergan	742	25.2	−7.4
Conservative	Jamie Williams	302	10.3	+4.0
Liberal Democrats	Andy Hardwick-Moss	211	7.2	−3.8
Majority		947	34.2	
Turnout		2,944	24.1	
Labour hold		Swing		

=== Levenshulme ===
Levenshulme
Party	Candidate	Votes	%	±%
Labour	Aftab Ahmed	2,210	52.2	+24.8
Liberal Democrats	John Commons*	1,204	28.4	−22.8
Green	David Mottram	627	14.8	+2.5
Conservative	Ryan El-Idrissi	194	4.6	−4.5
Majority		1,006	23.8	
Turnout		4,235	37.9	
Labour gain from Liberal Democrats		Swing		

=== Longsight ===
Longsight
Party	Candidate	Votes	%	±%
Labour	Abid Chohan*	2,855	72.4	+34.9
Liberal Democrats	Jawaid Chaudhry	531	13.5	−34.0
Green	Ryan Bestford	343	8.7	−1.4
Conservative	Charles Bailey	212	5.4	−0.4
Majority		2,324	59.0	
Turnout		3,941	35.5	
Labour hold		Swing		

=== Miles Platting and Newton Heath ===
Miles Platting and Newton Heath
Party	Candidate	Votes	%	±%
Labour	June Hitchen*	2,039	68.3	+25.7
Liberal Democrats	Victoria Roberts	544	18.2	−22.4
BNP	Joseph Cegla	186	6.2	−2.0
Conservative	Natalie Chapman	108	3.6	−0.4
Green	Christopher Hyland	108	3.6	+1.2
Majority		1,495	50.1	
Turnout		2,985	27.9	
Labour hold		Swing		

=== Moss Side ===
Moss Side
Party	Candidate	Votes	%	±%
Labour	Sameem Ali*	2,738	79.1	+11.9
Green	Mosab Musbahi	295	8.5	−0.5
Liberal Democrats	Aidan Flood	268	7.7	−7.9
Conservative	Bolanle Ayadi	162	4.7	−3.6
Majority		2,443	70.5	
Turnout		3,463	29.3	
Labour hold		Swing		

=== Moston ===
Moston
Party	Candidate	Votes	%	±%
Labour	Henry Cooper*	2,234	62.1	+6.6
Conservative	Steven Booth	528	14.7	−5.4
BNP	John O'Shaughnessy	313	8.7	N/A
Liberal Democrats	Tim Hartley	312	8.7	−1.2
Green	Mary Candeland	208	5.8	1.6
Majority		1,706	47.5	
Turnout		3,595	32.5	
Labour hold		Swing		

=== Northenden ===
Northenden
Party	Candidate	Votes	%	±%
Labour	Richard Cowell	2,111	58.7	+14.1
Liberal Democrats	Dave Nuttall	1,235	31.2	−10.1
Conservative	Phillip Page	272	6.9	−1.6
UKIP	Danielle Brannon	172	4.3	N/A
Green	Chris Gibbins	166	4.2	−1.4
Majority		876	22.1	
Turnout		3,956	35.7	
Labour hold		Swing		

=== Old Moat ===
Old Moat
Party	Candidate	Votes	%	±%
Labour	Jeffrey Smith*	2,311	65.7	+12.0
Liberal Democrats	Robert Mackle	413	11.7	−17.4
Green	Barney Wolfram	373	10.6	+1.7
Conservative	Luke Springthorpe	315	9.0	+0.6
Independent	Yasmin Zalzala	103	2.9	N/A
Majority		1,898	54.0	
Turnout		3,515	32.0	
Labour hold		Swing		

=== Rusholme ===
Rusholme
Party	Candidate	Votes	%	±%
Labour	Kate Chappell	2,238	61.3	+35.9
Liberal Democrats	Abu Chowdhury*	883	24.2	−18.1
Green	Richard Lane	319	8.7	+1.1
Conservative	Dola Miah	212	5.8	−0.7
Majority		1,355	37.1	
Turnout		3,652	34.1	
Labour gain from Liberal Democrats		Swing		

=== Sharston ===
Sharston
Party	Candidate	Votes	%	±%
Labour Co-op	Joyce Keller*	1,845	63.3	+10.8
Conservative	Jim McCullough	505	17.3	−8.2
UKIP	Eugene Cassidy	222	7.6	N/A
Liberal Democrats	Dave Page	138	4.7	−7.6
Green	Dane Lam	133	4.6	−5.1
TUSC	Shari Holden	70	2.4	N/A
Majority		1,340	46.0	
Turnout		2,913	25.1	
Labour Co-op hold		Swing		

=== Whalley Range ===
Whalley Range
Party	Candidate	Votes	%	±%
Labour	Aftab Razaq	3,050	66.8	+31.8
Liberal Democrats	Michael Chubb	625	13.7	−36.5
Green	Ayo Ogolo	574	12.6	+2.9
Conservative	Nathan Cruddas	318	7.0	+1.9
Majority		2,425	53.1	
Turnout		4,567	40.4	
Labour gain from Independent		Swing		

=== Withington ===
Withington
Party	Candidate	Votes	%	±%
Labour Co-op	Chris Paul	1,476	43.8	+21.3
Liberal Democrats	Alison Firth*	1,161	34.4	−26.3
Green	Laura Bannister	513	15.2	+5.5
Conservative	Shumaila Malik	223	6.6	−0.5
Majority		315	9.3	
Turnout		3,373	29.8	
Labour gain from Liberal Democrats		Swing		

=== Woodhouse Park ===
Woodhouse Park
Party	Candidate	Votes	%	±%
Labour	Barbara O'Neil*	1,756	72.7	+7.4
Conservative	Stephen McHugh	306	12.7	−5.5
UKIP	Pamela Shotton	174	7.2	N/A
Green	Kathleen Molteno	96	4.0	−3.8
Liberal Democrats	Sarah Harding	83	3.4	−5.4
Majority		1,450	60.0	
Turnout		2,415	24.2	
Labour hold		Swing		
