= Greater Manchester Central (European Parliament constituency) =

Former European Parliament constituency

- European Parliament constituency
- Boundary within North West England (1984-1994)
- Member state: United Kingdom
- Created: 1984
- Dissolved: 1999
- MEPs: 1

Greater Manchester Central was, from 1984 to 1999, a European Parliament constituency centered on Greater Manchester, in North West England.

Prior to its uniform adoption of proportional representation in 1999, the United Kingdom used first-past-the-post for the European elections in England, Scotland and Wales. The European Parliament constituencies used under that system were smaller than the later regional constituencies and had only one Member of the European Parliament each.

Boundary within North West England (1994-1999)

== Boundaries ==
1984–1994: Altrincham and Sale, Davyhulme, Manchester Blackley, Manchester Central, Manchester Gorton, Manchester Withington, Manchester Wythenshawe, Stretford.

1994–1999: Cheadle, Hazel Grove, Manchester Blackley, Manchester Central, Manchester Gorton, Manchester Withington, Stockport, Stretford.

== MEPs ==
Election	Member	Party
1984	Eddy Newman	Labour
1999	Constituency abolished: see North West England	

== Election results ==
European Parliament election, 1984: Greater Manchester Central
Party	Candidate	Votes	%	±%
Labour	Eddy Newman	76,830	50.8	
Conservative	Thomas R. M. Sewell	48,753	32.2	
Liberal	E. A. O. G. (George) Wedell	24,192	16.0	
Independent	K. J. Martin	1,430	1.0	
Majority		28,077	18.6	
Turnout		151,205	29.8	
Labour win (new seat)				

European Parliament election, 1989: Greater Manchester Central
Party	Candidate	Votes	%	±%
Labour	Eddy Newman	86,914	51.7	+0.9
Conservative	Cheryl Gillan	48,047	28.6	−3.6
Green	Brian A. Candeland	19,742	11.8	New
SLD	John H. Mulholland	9,437	5.6	−10.4
SDP	Simon M. Millson	2,769	1.6	New
Humanist	S. Knight	1,045	0.6	New
Majority		38,867	23.1	+4.5
Turnout		167,954	34.9	+5.1
Labour hold		Swing		

European Parliament election, 1994: Greater Manchester Central
Party	Candidate	Votes	%	±%
Labour	Eddy Newman	74,935	53.4	+1.7
Conservative	Mrs. Sylvia H. Mason	32,490	23.2	−5.4
Liberal Democrats	John L. Begg	22,988	16.4	+10.8
Green	Brian A. Candeland	4,952	3.5	−8.3
Liberal	Philip Burke	3,862	2.8	New
Natural Law	Paul Stanley	1,017	0.7	New
Majority		42,445	30.2	+7.1
Turnout		140,244	29.1	−5.8
Labour hold		Swing		
