= Miles Platting and Newton Heath =

Electoral ward in Manchester, England

Coordinates: 53.4692°N 2.2186°W

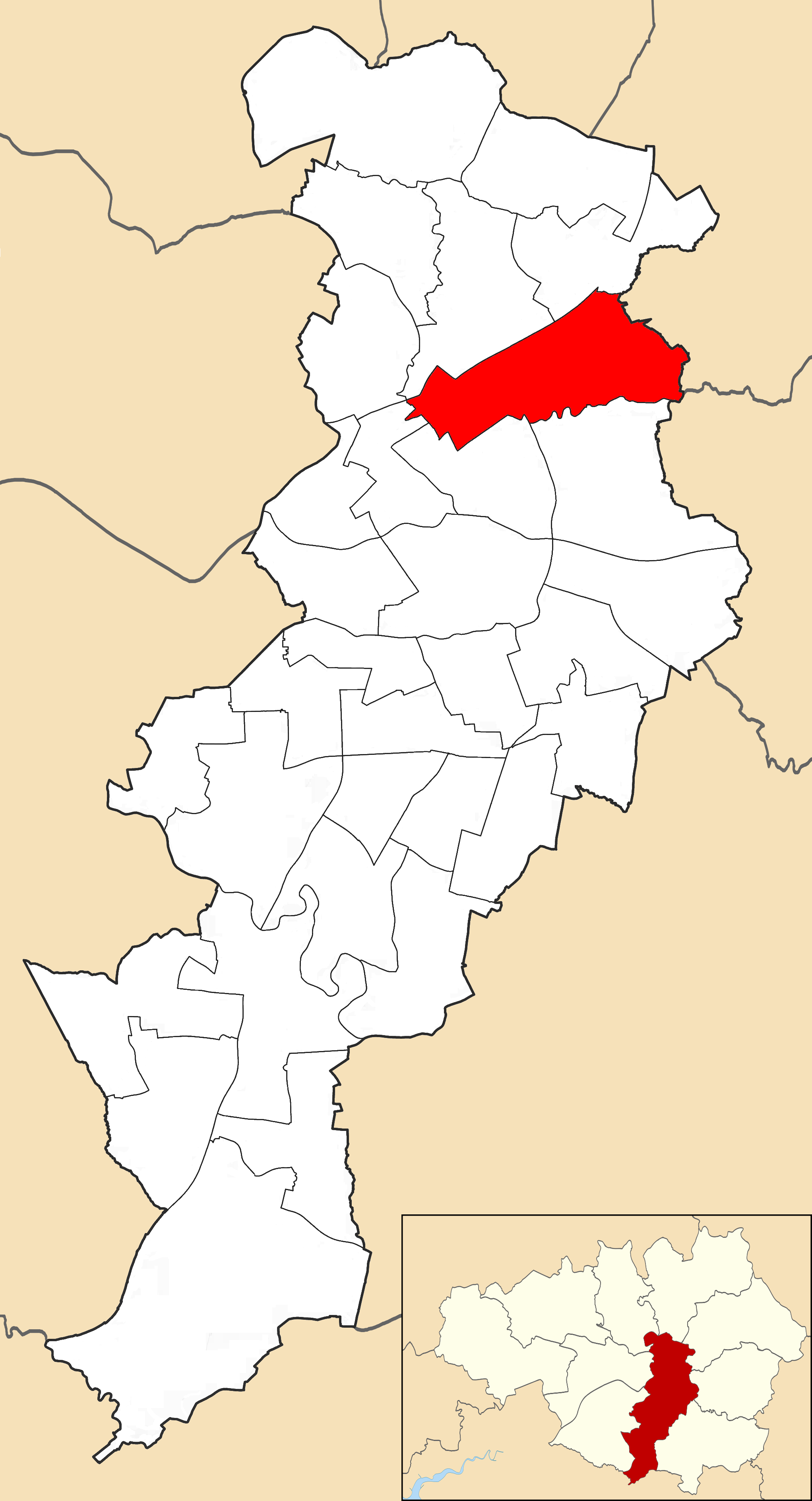
- Miles Platting and Newton Heath electoral ward within Manchester City Council

- Location within Greater Manchester
- Population: 14,693 (2011 Census
- OS grid reference: SJ8558696962
- Metropolitan borough: City of Manchester
- Metropolitan county: Greater Manchester
- Region: North West
- Country: England
- Sovereign state: United Kingdom
- Post town: MANCHESTER
- Postcode district: M40
- Dialling code: 0161
- Police: Greater Manchester
- Fire: Greater Manchester
- Ambulance: North West
- UK Parliament: Manchester Central
- Councillors: Tom Lane (Reform); John Flanagan (Labour); June Hitchin (Labour)

Miles Platting and Newton Heath is an electoral ward in the city of Manchester, North West England which covers the districts of Miles Platting and Newton Heath. The population of this ward at the 2011 census was 14,693.

== Councillors ==
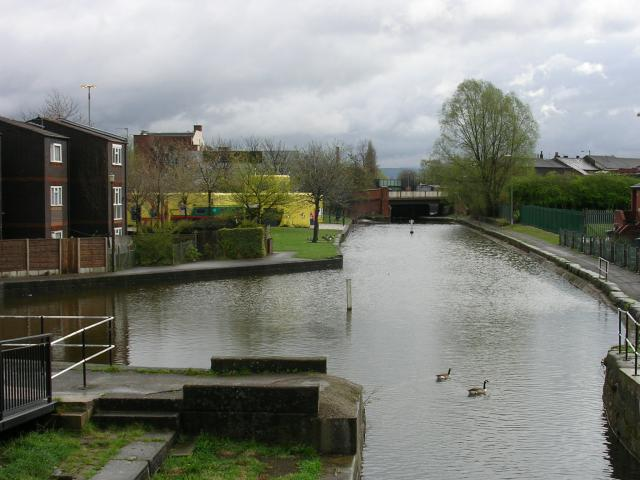
Rochdale Canal at Newton Heath.

There are two Labour Party councilors representing the ward: John Flanagan and June Hitchen, as well as Tom Lane from Reform.

Election	Councillor	Councillor	Councillor
2018	John Flanagan (Lab)	June Hitchin (Lab)	Carmine Grimshaw (Lab)
2019	John Flanagan (Lab)	June Hitchin (Lab)	Carmine Grimshaw (Lab)
2021	John Flanagan (Lab)	June Hitchin (Lab)	Carmine Grimshaw (Lab)
2022	John Flanagan (Lab)	June Hitchin (Lab)	Carmine Grimshaw (Lab)
2023	John Flanagan (Lab)	June Hitchin (Lab)	Carmine Grimshaw (Lab)
2024	John Flanagan (Lab)	June Hitchin (Lab)	Carmine Grimshaw (Lab)
2026	John Flanagan (Lab)	June Hitchin (Lab)	Tom Lane (Reform)

indicates seat up for re-election.

== Elections in 2020s ==
* denotes incumbent councillor seeking re-election.

=== May 2021 ===
2021
Party	Candidate	Votes	%	±%
Labour	June Hitchin*	1,997	69.8	10.3 ▼
Conservative	Paul Wan	336	11.7	1.3 ▲
Green	Paul Hodges	269	9.4	5.6 ▲
Reform	Derek Brocklehurst	140	4.9	New
Liberal Democrats	Samuel Olanrewaju	118	4.1	New
Majority		1,661	58.1	
Rejected ballots		32	1.1	
Turnout		2,892	22.2	0.2 ▼
Registered electors		13,032		
Labour hold		Swing	5.8 ▼	

=== May 2022 ===
2022
Party	Candidate	Votes	%	±%
Labour	Carmine Grimshaw*	1,820	72.8	2.3 ▲
Conservative	Derek Brocklehurst	302	12.1	2.2 ▲
Green	Tamara Huber	243	9.7	0.1 ▲
Liberal Democrats	Charles Turner	117	4.7	n/a
Majority		1,518	60.7	
Rejected ballots		18		
Turnout		2,500	19.1	
Registered electors		13,069		
Labour hold		Swing	0.1 ▲	

=== May 2023 ===
2023
Party	Candidate	Votes	%	±%
Labour	John Flanagan*	1,872	74.1	13.8▲
Conservative	Derek Brocklehurst	247	9.8	5.0▲
Green	Jonathon Mbay Kazemb	238	9.4	1.4▲
Liberal Democrats	Charles Turner	168	6.7	2.9▲
Majority		1,625		
Rejected ballots		21		
Turnout			19.39	
Registered electors		13,138		
Labour hold		Swing		

=== May 2024 ===
2024
Party	Candidate	Votes	%	±%
Labour	June Hitchen*	1,876	65.8	4.0 ▼
Independent	Donna Liley	320	11.2	New
Green	Prashant Kumbhat	295	10.3	0.9 ▲
Conservative	Bassel Ounah	191	6.7	5.0 ▼
Liberal Democrats	Charles William Turner	134	4.7	0.6 ▲
Majority		1,556	54.6	
Rejected ballots		35	0.9	
Turnout		2,851	21.21	
Registered electors		13,440		
Labour hold		Swing	7.6 ▼	

=== May 2026 ===
2026
Party	Candidate	Votes	%	±%

Miles Platting and Newton Heath
Party	Candidate	Votes	%	±%
Reform	Tom Lane	1,243	34.3	New
Labour	Carmine Grimshaw*	1,166	32.2	▼40.6
Green	Pascal Checkley	884	24.4	▲14.7
Conservative	Adeyemi Ajayi	196	5.4	▼6.7
Liberal Democrats	Andrew Weston	137	3.8	▼0.9
Majority		77	0.2	N/A
Turnout		3,626	26.7	▲7.6
Reform gain from Labour		Swing		

- Carmine Grimshaw was an incumbent councillor for Miles Platting and Newton Heath ward.

== Elections in 2010s ==
=== May 2019 ===
2019
Party	Candidate	Votes	%	±%
Labour	John Flanagan*	1,601	60.3	▼3.0
UKIP	Christopher Owen	459	17.3	▲6.7
Green	Stephanie Wyatt	213	8.0	▼1.6
Independent	Francesco Falcioni	133	5.0	n/a
Conservative	Michael Ciotkowski	128	4.8	▼4.0
Liberal Democrats	Simon Lepori	101	3.8	n/a
Majority		1,142	43.0	▼9.7
Rejected ballots		21	0.79	
Turnout		2,656	21.25	▼1.1
Registered electors		12,499		
Labour hold		Swing	▼4.95	

=== May 2018 ===
2018
Party	Candidate	Votes	%	±%
Labour	Carmine Grimshaw*	1,969	70.5	
Labour	June Hitchen*	1,953	69.9	
Labour	John Flanaghan*	1,769	63.3	
UKIP	Martin Power	297	10.6	
Conservative	Beverley Cottrell	276	9.9	
Green	Paul Madley	268	9.6	
Conservative	Vera Berry	250	8.9	
Conservative	Jacqueline Mountaine	212	7.6	
TUSC	Bridget Taylor	115	4.1	
Majority				
Turnout		2,794	22.4	
Labour win (new boundaries)				
Labour win (new boundaries)				
Labour win (new boundaries)				

=== May 2016 ===
2016
Party	Candidate	Votes	%	±%
Labour	Carmine Geatano Grimshaw*	1,938	78.49	
Conservative	Harry Kagkouras	193	7.82	
Green	Isobel Mary Patience	134	5.43	
Liberal Democrats	Richard Martin Kilpatrick	116	4.70	
TUSC	Bridget Taylor	88	3.56	
Majority		1,745	70.68	
Turnout		2,469	24.12	
Labour hold		Swing		

=== May 2015 ===
2015
Party	Candidate	Votes	%	±%
Labour	June Hitchen*	3,635	73.1	+4.8
Conservative	Harry Kagouras	530	10.7	+7.1
Green	Nathan Rae	350	7.0	+3.4
Liberal Democrats	John Richard Bridges	257	5.2	−13.0
TUSC	Tom Simpson	202	4.0	N/A
Majority		3,105	62.4	
Turnout		4,974	47.4	+19.5
Labour hold		Swing		

=== May 2014 ===
2014
Party	Candidate	Votes	%	±%
Labour	John Flanagan	1,826	65.24	
BNP	Gareth Black	397	14.18	
Green	Jake Lay	242	8.65	
Conservative	Benjamin John Michael Thacker	190	6.79	
Liberal Democrats	Grace Baynham	144	5.14	
Majority		1,429	51.1	
Turnout		2,799	25.82	
Labour hold		Swing		

=== May 2012 ===
2012
Party	Candidate	Votes	%	±%
Labour	Carmine Grimshaw	1,807	65.0	+25.5
Liberal Democrats	Damien O'Connor*	830	29.8	−15.8
Green	Jacob Lay	145	5.2	+2.6
Majority		977	35	
Turnout		2,782	25.76	
Labour gain from Liberal Democrats		Swing		

=== May 2011 ===
2011
Party	Candidate	Votes	%	±%
Labour	June Hitchen*	2,039	68.3	+25.7
Liberal Democrats	Victoria Roberts	544	18.2	−22.4
BNP	Joseph Cegla	186	6.2	−2.0
Conservative	Natalie Chapman	108	3.6	−0.4
Green	Christopher Hyland	108	3.6	+1.2
Majority		1,495	50.1	
Turnout		2,985	27.9	
Labour hold		Swing		

=== May 2010 ===
2010
Party	Candidate	Votes	%	±%
Labour	John Flanagan*	2,402	50.1	+10.6
Liberal Democrats	Gerry Diamond	1,596	33.3	−12.3
BNP	John O'Shaughnessy	400	8.3	+0.4
Conservative	Sheraz Sherazi	265	5.5	+0.9
Green	Christopher Hyland	80	1.7	−0.9
Libertarian	Stuart Charles Heal	55	1.1	+1.1
Majority		806	16.8	+11.0
Turnout		4,79	45.8	+14.8
Labour hold		Swing	+11.4	
