= Brooklands (Manchester ward) =

- Ward
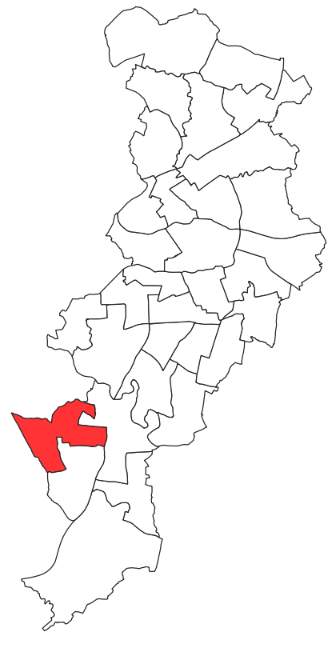
- Brooklands ward (2018) within Manchester

- Coat of arms
- Interactive map of Brooklands
- Country: United Kingdom
- Constituent country: England
- Region: North West England
- County: Greater Manchester
- Metropolitan borough: Manchester
- Created: May 1971
- Named for: Brooklands

Government
  - Type: Unicameral
  - Body: Manchester City Council
- UK Parliamentary Constituency: Wythenshawe and Sale East

Brooklands is an electoral division of Manchester City Council which has been represented since 1971. It covers the Brooklands area of Wythenshawe.

== Overview ==
Brooklands ward was created in 1971, covering the northern portion of the Baguley ward and the western portion of the Northenden ward. In 1982, the ward's southern boundary became the Cheshire Lines Railway, then in 1994 that part of the ward to the west of Brooklands road was transferred from Manchester to the Metropolitan Borough of Trafford. A further city-wide boundary revision in 2004, transferred the Roundthorn area from the Baguley ward. The ward's boundaries were left largely unchanged at the latest revision in 2018.

From its creation until 1997, the ward formed part of the Manchester Wythenshawe Parliamentary constituency. Since 1997, it has formed part of the Wythenshawe and Sale East Parliamentary constituency.

== Councillors ==
Election	Councillor	Councillor	Councillor
1971	D. Healy (Lab)	F. Firth (Lab)	E. Mellor (Lab)
1972	D. Healy (Lab)	F. Firth (Lab)	Y. Emery (Con)
1973	Y. Emery (Con)	G. W. G. Fitzsimons (Con)	A. A. O'Connor (Con)
1975	Y. Emery (Con)	G. W. G. Fitzsimons (Con)	A. A. O'Connor (Con)
1976	Y. Emery (Con)	G. W. G. Fitzsimons (Con)	A. A. O'Connor (Con)
1978	Y. Emery (Con)	G. W. G. Fitzsimons (Con)	A. A. O'Connor (Con)
1979	Y. Emery (Con)	G. W. G. Fitzsimons (Con)	D. Healy (Lab)
1980	Y. Emery (Con)	K. Barnes (Lab)	D. Healy (Lab)
1982	Y. Emery (Con)	A. A. O'Connor (Con)	D. Sumberg (Con)
1983	Y. Emery (Con)	A. A. O'Connor (Con)	D. Sumberg (Con)
1984	Y. Emery (Con)	J. Broderick (Lab)	P. Clarke (Lab)
1986	F. Hatton (Lab)	J. Broderick (Lab)	P. Clarke (Lab)
1987	F. Hatton (Lab)	J. Broderick (Lab)	A. A. O'Connor (Con)
1988	F. Hatton (Lab)	P. Cummins (Con)	A. A. O'Connor (Con)
March 1989	F. Hatton (Lab)	P. Cummins (Con)	M. B. Beaugeard (Con)
1990	G. Collier (Lab)	P. Cummins (Con)	M. B. Beaugeard (Con)
1991	G. Collier (Lab)	P. Cummins (Con)	M. B. Beaugeard (Con)
1992	G. Collier (Lab)	P. Cummins (Con)	M. B. Beaugeard (Con)
1994	G. Evans (Lab)	P. Cummins (Con)	M. B. Beaugeard (Con)
1995	G. Evans (Lab)	P. Cummins (Con)	S. Calloway (Lab)
1996	G. Evans (Lab)	S. Cooley (Lab)	S. Calloway (Lab)
1998	G. Evans (Lab)	S. Cooley (Lab)	S. Calloway (Lab)
1999	G. Evans (Lab)	S. Cooley (Lab)	S. Murphy (Lab)
2000	G. Evans (Lab)	S. Cooley (Lab)	S. Murphy (Lab)
2002	G. Evans (Lab)	S. Cooley (Lab)	S. Murphy (Lab)
2003	G. Evans (Lab)	S. Cooley (Lab)	S. Murphy (Lab)
2004	Glynn Evans (Lab)	Susan Cooley (Lab)	Susan Murphy (Lab)
2006	Glynn Evans (Lab)	Susan Cooley (Lab)	Susan Murphy (Lab)
2007	Glynn Evans (Lab)	Susan Cooley (Lab)	Susan Murphy (Lab)
2008	Glynn Evans (Lab)	Susan Cooley (Lab)	Susan Murphy (Lab)
2010	Glynn Evans (Lab)	Susan Cooley (Lab)	Susan Murphy (Lab)
2011	Glynn Evans (Lab)	Susan Cooley (Lab)	Susan Murphy (Lab)
2012	Glynn Evans (Lab)	Susan Cooley (Lab)	Susan Murphy (Lab)
2014	Glynn Evans (Lab)	Susan Cooley (Lab)	Susan Murphy (Lab)
2015	Glynn Evans (Lab)	Susan Cooley (Lab)	Susan Murphy (Lab)
2016	Glynn Evans (Lab)	Susan Cooley (Lab)	Susan Murphy (Lab)
2018	Susan Cooley (Lab)	Glynn Evans (Lab)	Susan Murphy (Lab)
2019	Susan Cooley (Lab)	Glynn Evans (Lab)	Susan Murphy (Lab)
2021	Susan Cooley (Lab)	Julia Baker-Smith (Lab)	Glynn Evans (Lab)
2022	Susan Cooley (Lab)	Julia Baker-Smith (Lab)	Glynn Evans (Lab)
2023	Susan Cooley (Lab)	Julia Baker-Smith (Lab)	Glynn Evans (Lab)
September 2023	Susan Cooley (Lab)	Dave Marsh (Lab)	Glynn Evans (Lab)
2024	Susan Cooley (Lab)	Dave Marsh (Lab)	Glynn Evans (Lab)
2026	Steve Hodgkiss (Ref UK)	Dave Marsh (Lab)	Glynn Evans (Lab)

== Elections ==
=== Elections in 2020s ===
==== May 2026 ====
2026
Party	Candidate	Votes	%	±%
Reform	Steven Hodgkiss	1,198	32.3	New
Labour	Sue Cooley*	1,190	32.0	▼28.0
Green	Amy Bower	767	20.7	▲9.4
Conservative	Stephen Carlton-Woods	377	10.2	▼12.7
Liberal Democrats	Martha O'Donoghue	182	4.9	▼0.6
Majority		8	0.2	N/A
Turnout		3,714	33.5	▲8.3
Reform gain from Labour		Swing		

==== May 2024 ====
2024
Party	Candidate	Votes	%	±%
Labour	Dave Marsh*	1,737	62.8	1.3 ▲
Conservative	Yemi Ajayi	407	14.7	2.1 ▲
Green	Grace Buczkowska	402	14.5	2.6 ▲
Liberal Democrats	Euan Stewart	177	6.4	1.3 ▲
Majority		1,330	48.1	
Rejected ballots		44	1.6	
Turnout		2,767	24.9	
Registered electors		11,093		
Labour hold		Swing	0.4 ▼	

==== September 2023 (by-election) ====
By-election: 7 September 2023
Party	Candidate	Votes	%	±%
Labour	Dave Marsh	923	61.5	10.8 ▲
Conservative	Norman Decent	189	12.6	9.1 ▼
Green	Grace Buczkowska	178	11.9	2.4 ▲
Reform	Dylan Evans	133	8.9	New
Liberal Democrats	Euan Stewart	77	5.1	2.1 ▲
Majority		734	48.9	
Turnout			13.6	
Labour hold		Swing		

==== May 2023 ====
2023
Party	Candidate	Votes	%	±%
Labour	Glynn Evans*	1,777	66.1	16.8 ▲
Conservative	Stephen McHugh	324	12.1	5.0 ▼
Green	Grace Buczkowska	274	10.2	0.9 ▼
Reform	Dylan Evans	168	6.3	N/A
Liberal Democrats	Mark Saunders	133	4.9	2.6 ▼
Majority		1,453	54.1	21.9 ▲
Rejected ballots		11		
Turnout		2,687		
Registered electors		10,990		
Labour hold		Swing	10.9 ▲	

==== May 2022 ====
2022
Party	Candidate	Votes	%	±%
Labour	Susan Cooley*	1,652	60.0	0.3 ▲
Conservative	Norman Decent	631	22.9	5.1 ▼
Green	Grace Buczkowska	310	11.3	0.2 ▲
Liberal Democrats	Ellin Sunders	152	5.5	0.1 ▲
Majority		1,021	37.1	
Rejected ballots		11		
Turnout		2,745	25.2	0.1 ▲
Registered electors		10,951		
Labour hold		Swing	2.7 ▲	

==== May 2021 ====
2021 (2 vacancies)
Party	Candidate	Votes	%	±%
Labour	Julia Baker-Smith	1,686	53.6	▼2.8
Labour	Glynn Evans*	1,499	47.7	▼10.3
Conservative	Stephen Carlton-Woods	689	21.9	▼5.1
Conservative	Ralph Ellerton	672	21.4	▼3.4
Green	Grace Buczkowska	385	12.2	▲1.1
Green	Maggie Hoffgen	211	6.7	▼4.4
Liberal Democrats	Nick Saunders	112	3.6	▼1.2
Liberal Democrats	Mark Saunders	75	2.4	▼2.4
Monster Raving Loony	Lord Cam	57	1.8	new
Majority				
Rejected ballots		27		
Turnout		3,145	28.29	
Registered electors		11,116		
Labour hold		Swing		
Labour hold		Swing		

=== Elections in 2010s ===
==== May 2019 ====
2019
Party	Candidate	Votes	%	±%
Labour	Sue Murphy*	1,336	49.3	▼1.3
Conservative	Stephen Carlton-Woods	463	17.1	▼9.9
UKIP	Kathy Mason	389	14.4	n/a
Green	Grace Buczkowska	301	11.1	Steady
Liberal Democrats	Sebastian Bate	203	7.5	▲2.7
Majority		873	32.2	▲7.6
Rejected ballots		18	0.66	
Turnout		2,710	24.29	▼0.8
Registered electors		11,157		
Labour hold		Swing	▲4.3	

==== May 2018 ====
2018 (3 vacancies; new boundaries)
Party	Candidate	Votes	%	±%
Labour	Sue Cooley*	1,684	59.7	
Labour	Glynn Evans*	1,635	58.0	
Labour	Sue Murphy*	1,456	51.6	
Conservative	Stephen Carlton-Woods	763	27.0	
Conservative	Stephen McHugh	705	25.0	
Conservative	David Semple	634	22.5	
Green	Robert Nunney	313	11.1	
Liberal Democrats	Paul Jones	153	5.4	
Liberal Democrats	Norman Lewis	134	4.8	
Liberal Democrats	Bernie Ryan	117	4.1	
Majority				
Turnout		2,821	25.1	
Labour win (new boundaries)				
Labour win (new boundaries)				
Labour win (new boundaries)				

==== May 2016 ====
2016
Party	Candidate	Votes	%	±%
Labour	Glynn Evans*	1,738	59.30	
UKIP	Pat Bebby	544	18.56	
Conservative	Stephen Paul Woods	504	17.20	
Liberal Democrats	Andrew McGuinness	145	4.95	
Majority		1,194	40.74	
Turnout		2,931	28.20	
Labour hold		Swing		

==== May 2015 ====
2015
Party	Candidate	Votes	%	±%
Labour	Sue Cooley*	3,136	52.2	−5.7
Conservative	Stephen Paul Woods	1,363	22.8	−0.8
UKIP	Pat Bebby	1,044	17.4	+9.6
Liberal Democrats	Philip Andrew Stubbs	243	4.0	−2.2
Green	Calum Thomson Wiggle	217	3.6	−0.8
Majority		1,773	29.4	
Turnout		6,003	55.7	+25.0
Labour hold		Swing		

==== May 2014 ====
2014
Party	Candidate	Votes	%	±%
Labour Co-op	Sue Murphy	1,464	49.38	+3.18
UKIP	Anne Spoor	734	24.76	+19.56
Conservative	Ralph John Ellerton	507	17.10	−9.80
Green	Eithne Quinn	159	5.36	+2.46
Liberal Democrats	Joel Moorcroft	101	3.41	−15.19
Majority		730		
Turnout				
Labour hold		Swing		

==== May 2012 ====
2012
Party	Candidate	Votes	%	±%
Labour	Glynn Evans*	1,629	53.7	+9.5
Conservative	Stephen Woods	532	17.6	−20.8
UKIP	Nathan Gilbert	279	9.2	N/A
Green	Eithne Quinn	140	4.6	−0.5
Liberal Democrats	Peter Maxson	111	3.7	−8.9
Majority		1,097	40.8	
Turnout		2,691	28.6	
Labour hold		Swing		

==== May 2011 ====
2011
Party	Candidate	Votes	%	±%
Labour	Sue Cooley*	1,876	57.9	+7.6
Conservative	Stephen Woods	764	23.6	−9.4
UKIP	Nathan Gilbert	254	7.8	N/A
Liberal Democrats	Peter James Maxson	201	6.2	−5.6
Green	Eithne Quinn	143	4.4	−0.4
Majority		1,112	34.3	
Turnout		3,238	30.7	
Labour hold		Swing	+6.6	

==== May 2010 ====
2010
Party	Candidate	Votes	%	±%
Labour	Sue Murphy*	2,633	46.2	+2.0
Conservative	Marie Raynor	1,534	26.9	−11.5
Liberal Democrats	Peter James Maxson	1,061	18.6	+6.0
UKIP	Pam Shotton	298	5.2	+5.2
Green	Elaine Brown	167	2.9	−2.2
Majority		1,099	19.3	+13.5
Turnout		5,693	55.4	+26.8
Labour hold		Swing	+6.7	

=== Elections in 2000s ===
==== May 2008 ====
2008
Party	Candidate	Votes	%	±%
Labour	Glynn Evans	1,274	44.2	
Conservative	Marie Raynor	1,106	38.4	
Liberal Democrats	Gary Bridges	362	12.6	
Green	Tamisin MacCarthy-Morrogh	146	5.1	
Majority		168	5.8	
Turnout		2,882	28.6	
Labour hold		Swing		

==== May 2007 ====
2007
Party	Candidate	Votes	%	±%
Labour	Sue Cooley*	1,460	50.3	+8.2
Conservative	Marie Raynor	958	33.0	+3.8
Liberal Democrats	David Kierman	342	11.8	−12.3
Green	Tamisin MacCarthy-Morrogh	140	4.8	+0.2
Majority		502	17.3	+4.3
Turnout		2,900	29.1	−4.3
Labour hold		Swing	+2.2	

==== May 2006 ====
2006
Party	Candidate	Votes	%	±%
Labour Co-op	Sue Murphy*	1,378	42.1	−2.7
Conservative	Ralph John Ellerton	953	29.2	−5.1
Liberal Democrats	John Paul Ankers	787	24.1	+10.7
Green	Tamisin MacCarthy-Morrogh	149	4.6	−2.8
Majority		425	13.0	+2.4
Turnout		3,267	33.4	−1.4
Labour hold		Swing	+1.2	

==== June 2004 ====
2004 (3 vacancies; new boundaries)
Party	Candidate	Votes	%	±%
Labour	Glynn Evans*	1,505	44.8	N/A
Labour	Susan Cooley*	1,463		
Labour	Susan Murphy*	1,247		
Conservative	Jane Percival	1,152	34.3	N/A
Conservative	Graeme Coombes	939		
Conservative	Lisa-Ann Boardman	932		
Liberal Democrats	Pamela Davis	449	13.4	N/A
Liberal Democrats	David Kierman	425		
Liberal Democrats	Barbara McMenamin	417		
Green	Jeffrey Ostle	249	7.4	N/A
Green	Colin Pratt	222		
Majority		95	10.5	N/A
Turnout		3,355	34.8	N/A
Labour win (new seat)				
Labour win (new seat)				
Labour win (new seat)				

==== May 2003 ====
2003
Party	Candidate	Votes	%	±%
Labour Co-op	Susan Murphy*	957	50.7	−8.1
Conservative	Jane Percival	562	29.8	−0.6
Liberal Democrats	John Ellis	228	12.1	+4.9
Green	Birgit Vollm	76	4.0	+0.4
Independent	Honor Donnelly	66	3.5	+3.5
Majority		395	20.9	−7.5
Turnout		1,889	22.5	−5.0
Labour hold		Swing	-3.7	

==== May 2002 ====
2002
Party	Candidate	Votes	%	±%
Labour	Glynn Evans*	1,375	58.8	+8.0
Conservative	John Kenny	711	30.4	−8.9
Liberal Democrats	Karen Farnen	168	7.2	+0.1
Green	Nicola Brooks	85	3.6	+0.8
Majority		664	28.4	+16.9
Turnout		2,339	27.5	+4.5
Labour hold		Swing	+8.4	

==== May 2000 ====
2000
Party	Candidate	Votes	%	±%
Labour	Susan Cooley*	948	50.8	−6.7
Conservative	John Kenny	733	39.3	+9.2
Liberal Democrats	Peter Rothery	133	7.1	−5.3
Green	Zoe Whiteman	53	2.8	+2.8
Majority		215	11.5	−15.9
Turnout		1,867	23.0	+3.0
Labour hold		Swing	-7.9	

=== Elections in 1990s ===
==== May 1999 ====
1999
Party	Candidate	Votes	%	±%
Labour	Susan Murphy*	1,106	57.5	+3.0
Conservative	Ian Bradshaw	579	30.1	−2.6
Liberal Democrats	Peter Rothery	238	12.4	−0.4
Majority		527	27.4	+5.6
Turnout		1,923	20.0	
Labour hold		Swing	+2.8	

==== May 1998 ====
1998
Party	Candidate	Votes	%	±%
Labour	Glynn Evans*	1,111	54.5	−1.9
Conservative	Ian Bradshaw	667	32.7	−0.2
Liberal Democrats	Bill Fisher	260	12.8	+3.9
Majority		444	21.8	−1.7
Turnout		2,038		
Labour hold		Swing	-0.8	

==== May 1996 ====
1996
Party	Candidate	Votes	%	±%
Labour	Susan Cooley	1,152	56.4	−10.7
Conservative	Paul Cummins*	672	32.9	+11.7
Liberal Democrats	Anthony McGarr	182	8.9	−1.2
FAN	J. Hamilton	35	1.7	+1.7
Majority		480	23.5	−22.4
Turnout		2,041		
Labour gain from Conservative		Swing	-11.2	

==== May 1995 ====
1995
Party	Candidate	Votes	%	±%
Labour	S. Calloway	1,783	67.1	+8.5
Conservative	Gladys Parry	564	21.2	−7.0
Liberal Democrats	Anthony McGarr	269	10.1	−3.1
Independent	P. Styles	42	1.6	+1.6
Majority		1,219	45.9	+15.6
Turnout		2,658		
Labour gain from Conservative		Swing	+7.7	

==== May 1994 ====
1994 (new boundaries)
Party	Candidate	Votes	%	±%
Labour	G. Evans	1,817	58.6	+20.5
Conservative	A. Langan	876	28.2	−26.1
Liberal Democrats	H. McKay	410	13.2	+7.7
Majority		941	30.3	+14.1
Turnout		3,103		
Labour hold		Swing	+23.3	

==== May 1992 ====
1992
Party	Candidate	Votes	%	±%
Conservative	H. Cummins*	2,033	54.3	+8.7
Labour	A. Harding	1,426	38.1	−2.9
Liberal Democrats	H. McKay	207	5.5	−4.4
Green	R. Cooke	76	2.0	−1.6
Majority		607	16.2	+11.6
Turnout		3,742		
Conservative hold		Swing	+5.8	

==== May 1991 ====
1991
Party	Candidate	Votes	%	±%
Conservative	M. B. Beaugeard	2,001	45.6	+7.1
Labour	A. S. Wood	1,799	41.0	−9.9
Liberal Democrats	S. A. Oliver	435	9.9	+2.8
Green	R. Clancy	156	3.6	0
Majority		202	4.6	−7.8
Turnout		4,391	45.4	
Conservative hold		Swing	+8.5	

==== May 1990 ====
1990
Party	Candidate	Votes	%	±%
Labour	G. Collier	2,263	50.9	+8.6
Conservative	A. T. Langan	1,712	38.5	−12.1
Liberal Democrats	A. B. Quinlan	316	7.1	−0.0
Green	C. S. Field	159	3.6	+3.6
Majority		551	12.4	+4.1
Turnout		4,450		
Labour hold		Swing	+10.3	

=== Elections in 1980s ===
==== March 1989 (by-election) ====
By-election: 16 March 1989
Party	Candidate	Votes	%	±%
Conservative	M. B. Beaugeard	1,703	42.5	−8.1
Labour	G. Collier	1,297	32.4	−9.9
SLD	S. Lawley	1,008	25.1	+18.0
Majority		406	10.1	+1.8
Turnout		4,008		
Conservative hold		Swing		

==== May 1988 ====
1988
Party	Candidate	Votes	%	±%
Conservative	P. Cummins	2,316	50.6	+0.6
Labour	J. Broderick*	1,934	42.3	+9.9
Liberal Democrats	D. Wraxall	325	7.1	−10.6
Majority		382	8.3	−9.3
Turnout		4,575		
Conservative gain from Labour		Swing	-4.6	

==== May 1987 ====
1987
Party	Candidate	Votes	%	±%
Conservative	Arthur O'Connor	2,646	50.0	+13.7
Labour	Paul Clarke*	1,714	32.4	−16.2
Alliance	David Wraxall	935	17.7	+2.6
Majority		932	17.6	+5.4
Turnout		5,295		
Conservative gain from Labour		Swing	+14.9	

==== May 1986 ====
1986
Party	Candidate	Votes	%	±%
Labour	F. Hatton	2,059	48.6	−0.7
Conservative	A. O'Connor	1,540	36.3	−2.9
Alliance	C. Duffy	641	15.1	+3.7
Majority		519	12.2	+2.1
Turnout		4,240		
Labour gain from Conservative		Swing	+1.1	

==== May 1984 ====
1984 (2 vacancies)
Party	Candidate	Votes	%	±%
Labour	John Broderick	2,188	49.3	+6.9
Labour	Paul Clarke	2,119		
Conservative	J. Graham	1,741	39.2	−6.3
Conservative	Arthur O'Connor*	1,729		
Alliance	Jeffrey Burton	508	11.4	−0.7
Alliance	Peter Thompson	464		
Majority		378	10.1	+6.9
Turnout		8,749		
Labour gain from Conservative		Swing		
Labour gain from Conservative		Swing	+6.6	

==== May 1983 ====
1983
Party	Candidate	Votes	%	±%
Conservative	David Sumberg*	2,249	45.5	+0.1
Labour	Paul Clarke	2,093	42.4	+7.8
Alliance	Jeffrey Burton	598	12.1	−7.9
Majority		156	3.2	−7.7
Turnout		4,940		
Conservative hold		Swing	-3.8	

==== May 1982 ====
1982 (3 vacancies; new boundaries)
Party	Candidate	Votes	%	±%
Conservative	Yvonne Emery*	2,232	45.4	N/A
Conservative	Arthur O'Connor	2,098		
Conservative	David Sumberg	2,047		
Labour	Roger Delahunty	1,699	34.6	N/A
Labour	Richard Reddington	1,627		
Labour	Harold Reid	1,621		
Alliance	Jeffrey Burton	983	20.0	N/A
Alliance	Lawrence Shields	943		
Alliance	Barry McColgan	941		
Majority		348	10.8	N/A
Turnout		4,914	49.3	N/A
Conservative win (new seat)				
Conservative win (new seat)				
Conservative win (new seat)				

==== May 1980 ====
1980
Party	Candidate	Votes	%	±%
Labour	K. Barnes	3,285	56.9	+8.8
Conservative	G. Fitzsimons*	2,231	38.6	−5.1
Liberal	G. Dulson	260	4.5	−3.7
Majority		1,054	18.2	+13.8
Turnout		5,776	46.0	−28.9
Labour gain from Conservative		Swing	+6.9	

=== Elections in 1970s ===
==== May 1979 ====
1979
Party	Candidate	Votes	%	±%
Labour	D. Healey	4,554	48.1	+4.9
Conservative	D. Sumberg	4,136	43.7	−13.1
Liberal	A. L. Algar	777	8.2	+8.2
Majority		418	4.4	−9.3
Turnout		9,467	74.9	+34.1
Labour gain from Conservative		Swing	+9.0	

==== May 1978 ====
1978
Party	Candidate	Votes	%	±%
Conservative	Y. Emery*	3,027	56.8	+7.3
Labour	J. Wilner	2,298	43.2	−1.8
Majority		729	13.7	+9.1
Turnout		5,325	40.8	
Conservative hold		Swing	+4.5	

==== May 1976 ====
1976
Party	Candidate	Votes	%	±%
Conservative	G. W. G. Fitzsimons*	2,795	49.5	−11.2
Labour	J. Wilner	2,538	45.0	+5.7
Liberal	G. F. Turner	309	5.5	+5.5
Majority		257	4.6	−16.7
Turnout		5,642		
Conservative hold		Swing	-8.4	

==== May 1975 ====
1975
Party	Candidate	Votes	%	±%
Conservative	A. A. O'Connor*	2,752	60.7	+5.0
Labour	E. Mellor	1,785	39.3	−5.0
Majority		967	21.3	+10.0
Turnout		4,537		
Conservative hold		Swing	+5.0	

==== May 1973 ====
1973 (3 vacancies; reorganisation)
Party	Candidate	Votes	%	±%
Conservative	Y. Emery	2,592	55.6	N/A
Conservative	G. W. G. Fitzsimons	2,548		
Conservative	A. A. O'Connor	2,509		
Labour	F. Firth	2,067	44.3	N/A
Labour	D. Healey	2,054		
Labour	E. Mellor	2,025		
Majority		442	11.3	N/A
Turnout		4,659		N/A
Conservative win (new seat)				
Conservative win (new seat)				
Conservative win (new seat)				

==== May 1972 ====
1972
Party	Candidate	Votes	%	±%
Conservative	Y. I. Emery	2,803	52.4	+12.3
Labour	E. Mellor*	2,551	47.6	−13.5
Majority		252	4.8	
Turnout		5,354		
Conservative gain from Labour		Swing		

==== May 1971 ====
1971 (3 vacancies)
Party	Candidate	Votes	%	±%
Labour	D. Healy	3,960	61.1	
Labour	F. Firth	3,938	60.7	
Labour	E. Mellor	3,667	56.5	
Conservative	Y. I. Emery	2,599	40.1	
Conservative	A. A. O'Connor	2,502	38.6	
Conservative	B. B. Williams*	2,487	38.3	
Communist	E. R. Whitworth	306	4.7	
Majority		1,068	16.5	
Turnout		6,486		
Labour win (new seat)				
Labour win (new seat)				
Labour win (new seat)				

== See also ==
- Manchester City Council
- Manchester City Council elections
