= Burnage (ward) =

- Ward
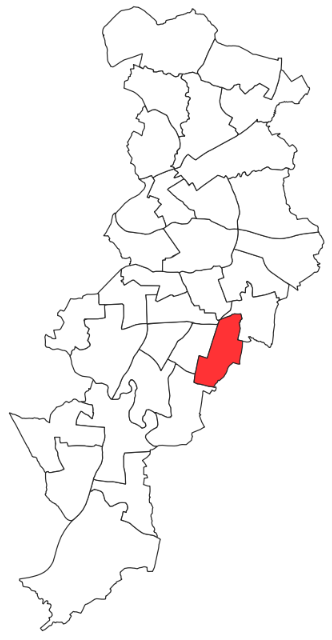
- Burnage ward (2018) within Manchester

- Coat of arms
- Interactive map of Burnage
- Country: United Kingdom
- Constituent country: England
- Region: North West England
- County: Greater Manchester
- Metropolitan borough: Manchester
- Created: May 1950
- Named for: Burnage

Government
  - Type: Unicameral
  - Body: Manchester City Council
- UK Parliamentary Constituency: Gorton and Denton

Burnage is an electoral division of Manchester City Council which has been represented since 1950. It covers the suburb of Burnage in South Manchester.

== Overview ==
Burnage ward was created in 1950, covering that part of the Withington ward to the east of Parrs Wood Road. In 1971, the ward's western boundary became the Styal Line. A further city-wide boundary revision in 1982 incorporated a small part of Didsbury into the ward, these boundaries were left unchanged after another revision in 2004. At the latest boundary revision in 2018, an area of Levenshulme ward to the north of the Fallowfield Loop was transferred to Burnage.

From its creation until 2024, the ward formed part of the Manchester Withington Parliamentary constituency. Since 2024, it has formed part of the Gorton and Denton Parliamentary constituency.

The election of councillor Bev Craig to Mayor of Greater Manchester triggered a local by-election, which was held on 10 September 2026. This was the fourth election in 2026 for Burnage residents.

== Councillors ==
Election	Councillor	Councillor	Councillor
1950	R. H. Ackerley (Con)	C. B. Walker (Con)	G. Lord (Con)
1951	D. J. Edwards (Con)	C. B. Walker (Con)	G. Lord (Con)
1952	D. J. Edwards (Con)	C. B. Walker (Con)	G. Lord (Con)
1953	D. J. Edwards (Con)	L. W. Biggs (Con)	G. Lord (Con)
1954	D. J. Edwards (Con)	L. W. Biggs (Con)	G. Lord (Con)
1955	D. J. Edwards (Con)	L. W. Biggs (Con)	G. Lord (Con)
1956	D. J. Edwards (Con)	L. W. Biggs (Con)	G. Lord (Con)
1957	D. J. Edwards (Con)	L. W. Biggs (Con)	G. Lord (Con)
1958	D. J. Edwards (Con)	H. Platt (Con)	G. Lord (Con)
1959	D. J. Edwards (Con)	H. Platt (Con)	G. Lord (Con)
1960	D. J. Edwards (Con)	H. Platt (Con)	G. Lord (Con)
1961	D. J. Edwards (Con)	H. Platt (Con)	G. Lord (Con)
1962	D. J. Edwards (Con)	H. Platt (Con)	G. Lord (Con)
1963	D. J. Edwards (Con)	H. Platt (Con)	G. Lord (Con)
1964	D. J. Edwards (Con)	H. Platt (Con)	G. Lord (Con)
1965	D. J. Edwards (Con)	H. Platt (Con)	G. Lord (Con)
1965	D. J. Edwards (Con)	H. Platt (Con)	G. Lord (Con)
November 1965	D. J. Edwards (Con)	H. Platt (Con)	B. J. Cox (Con)
1966	D. J. Edwards (Con)	H. Platt (Con)	B. J. Cox (Con)
1967	D. J. Edwards (Con)	H. Platt (Con)	B. J. Cox (Con)
January 1968	W. L. Lund (Con)	H. Platt (Con)	B. J. Cox (Con)
1968	W. L. Lund (Con)	H. Platt (Con)	B. J. Cox (Con)
1969	W. L. Lund (Con)	H. Platt (Con)	B. J. Cox (Con)
1970	W. L. Lund (Con)	H. Platt (Con)	L. Howarth (Con)
1971	H. Platt (Con)	L. Howarth (Con)	W. L. Lund (Con)
1972	H. Platt (Con)	L. Howarth (Con)	W. L. Lund (Con)
1973	L. Howarth (Con)	W. L. Lund (Con)	H. Platt (Con)
1975	L. Howarth (Con)	W. L. Lund (Con)	H. Platt (Con)
1976	L. Howarth (Con)	W. L. Lund (Con)	H. Platt (Con)
1978	L. Howarth (Con)	W. L. Lund (Con)	H. Platt (Con)
1979	L. Howarth (Con)	W. L. Lund (Con)	H. Platt (Con)
1980	L. Howarth (Con)	G. J. Martin (Lab)	H. Platt (Con)
1982	J. Kershaw (Con)	H. Platt (Con)	R. Nicholson (Con)
1983	J. Kershaw (Con)	H. Platt (Con)	M. Taylor (Lab)
1984	J. Kershaw (Con)	J. Clegg (Lab)	M. Taylor (Lab)
1986	R. Whyte (Lab)	J. Clegg (Lab)	M. Taylor (Lab)
1987	R. Whyte (Lab)	J. Clegg (Lab)	J. Leach (Con)
1988	R. Whyte (Lab)	J. Clegg (Lab)	J. Leach (Con)
1990	R. Whyte (Lab)	J. Clegg (Lab)	J. Leach (Con)
1991	R. Whyte (Lab)	J. Clegg (Lab)	R. Boyle (Lab)
March 1992	R. Whyte (Ind. Lab)	A. Williams (Lab)	R. Boyle (Lab)
1992	R. Whyte (Ind. Lab)	A. Williams (Lab)	R. Boyle (Lab)
1994	M. Taylor (Lab)	A. Williams (Lab)	R. Boyle (Lab)
1995	M. Taylor (Lab)	A. Williams (Lab)	M. Green (Lab)
1996	M. Taylor (Lab)	K. Robinson (Lab)	M. Green (Lab)
1998	M. Taylor (Lab)	K. Robinson (Lab)	M. Green (Lab)
1999	M. Taylor (Lab)	K. Robinson (Lab)	M. Green (Lab)
2000	M. Taylor (Lab)	K. Robinson (Lab)	M. Green (Lab)
2002	M. Taylor (Lab)	K. Robinson (Lab)	M. Green (Lab)
2003	M. Taylor (Lab)	K. Robinson (Lab)	J. Cameron (Lib Dem)
2004	John Cameron (Lib Dem)	Iain Donaldson (Lib Dem)	Rodney Isherwood (Lib Dem)
2006	John Cameron (Lib Dem)	Iain Donaldson (Lib Dem)	Rodney Isherwood (Lib Dem)
2007	John Cameron (Lib Dem)	Iain Donaldson (Lib Dem)	Rodney Isherwood (Lib Dem)
2008	John Cameron (Lib Dem)	Iain Donaldson (Lib Dem)	Rodney Isherwood (Lib Dem)
2010	John Cameron (Lib Dem)	Iain Donaldson (Lib Dem)	William Fisher (Lib Dem)
2011	Bev Craig (Lab)	Carl Austin (Lab)	William Fisher (Lib Dem)
2012	Bev Craig (Lab)	Carl Austin (Lab)	William Fisher (Lib Dem)
2014	Bev Craig (Lab)	Carl Austin (Lab)	Azra Ali (Lab)
2015	Bev Craig (Lab)	Carl Austin (Lab)	Azra Ali (Lab)
2016	Bev Craig (Lab)	Carl Austin-Behan (Lab)	Azra Ali (Lab)
2018	Ben Clay (Lab)	Bev Craig (Lab)	Azra Ali (Lab)
2019	Ben Clay (Lab)	Bev Craig (Lab)	Azra Ali (Lab)
2021	Ben Clay (Lab)	Bev Craig (Lab)	Azra Ali (Lab)
2022	Murtaza Iqbal (Lab)	Bev Craig (Lab)	Azra Ali (Lab)
2023	Murtaza Iqbal (Lab)	Bev Craig (Lab)	Azra Ali (Lab)
2024	Murtaza Iqbal (Lab)	Bev Craig (Lab)	Azra Ali (Lab)
2026	Asma Alam (Grn)	Bev Craig (Lab)	Azra Ali (Lab)
September 2026	Asma Alam (Grn)	Carl Austin-Behan (Lab)	Azra Ali (Lab)

== Elections ==
=== Elections in 2020s ===
==== September 2026 (by-election) ====
By-election: 10 September 2026
Party	Candidate	Votes	%	±%
Labour	Carl Austin-Behan	1,365	42.1	▼11.1
Green	Daoud Nawaz	1,037	32.0	▲12.8
Workers Party	Gaz Ranjha	466	14.4	▼2.3
Reform	Heather McDonagh	315	9.7	New
Liberal Democrats	Abdullah Vavdiwala	31	1.0	▼4.0
Conservative	Bhupinder Kumar	27	0.8	▼3.8
Majority		328	10.1	▼23.9
Turnout		3,241	23.6	▼8.5
Labour hold		Swing		

==== May 2026 ====
2026
Party	Candidate	Votes	%	±%
Green	Asma Alam	2,257	45.8	▲30.4
Labour	Murtaza Iqbal*	1,446	29.3	▼37.5
Reform	Heather McDonagh	837	17.0	New
Workers Party	Muhammad Nadim Taheer	110	2.2	New
Conservative	Bhupinder Kumar	107	2.2	▼5.3
Independent	Tenisha Nantume	24	0.5	New
Liberal Democrats	Michael Nash-Whitmore	152	3.1	▼6.5
Majority		811	16.4	N/A
Turnout		4,933	36.2	▲8.8
Green gain from Labour		Swing		

==== May 2024 ====
2024
Party	Candidate	Votes	%	±%
Labour	Bev Craig*	2,257	53.2	19.0 ▼
Green	Asma Alam	815	19.2	11.1 ▲
Workers Party	Syed Ataur Rahman	707	16.7	New
Liberal Democrats	Kobe Bibbon	210	5.0	1.4 ▼
Conservative	Muhammad Tahir	197	4.6	5.4 ▼
Majority		1,442	34.0	
Rejected ballots		53	1.3	
Turnout		4,239	32.1	
Registered electors		13,222		
Labour hold		Swing	14.9 ▼	

==== May 2023 ====
2023
Party	Candidate	Votes	%	±%
Labour	Azra Ali*	2,376	66.1	2.1 ▲
Green	Dick Venes	506	14.1	4.2 ▲
Liberal Democrats	John Cameron	497	13.8	1.8 ▼
Conservative	Md Shahed Hossain	199	5.5	1.4 ▲
Majority				
Rejected ballots		16	0.4	
Turnout				
Registered electors		12,982		
Labour hold		Swing		

==== May 2022 ====
2022
Party	Candidate	Votes	%	±%
Labour	Murtaza Iqbal	2,359	66.8	2.7 ▼
Green	Dick Venes	542	15.4	4.9 ▲
Liberal Democrats	Bryn Coombe	340	9.6	8.2 ▼
Conservative	Md Hossain	265	7.5	0.6 ▲
Majority		1,817	51.8	
Rejected ballots		25		
Turnout		3,506	27.4	5.2 ▼
Registered electors		12,908		
Labour hold		Swing	3.9 ▼	

==== May 2021 ====
2021
Party	Candidate	Votes	%	±%
Labour	Bev Craig*	3,036	72.2	1.8 ▼
Conservative	Shahed Hossain	421	10.0	3.3 ▲
Green	Brian Candeland	341	8.1	4.2 ▲
Liberal Democrats	Jamie Dwan	270	6.4	9.0 ▼
Independent	Andrea Timoney	137	3.3	New
Majority		2,615	62.2	
Rejected ballots		43	1.0	
Turnout		4,248	30.7	
Registered electors		13,045		
Labour hold		Swing	2.6 ▼	

=== Elections in 2010s ===
==== May 2019 ====
2019
Party	Candidate	Votes	%	±%
Labour	Azra Ali*	2,337	64.0	▲0.7
Liberal Democrats	Andrea Timoney	570	15.6	▼2.2
Green	Benjamin Dundas	362	9.9	▼0.6
UKIP	Ian Rae	233	6.4	n/a
Conservative	Shahed Hossain	149	4.1	▼1.5
Majority		1,767	48.2	▲2.7
Rejected ballots		18	0.49	
Turnout		3,668	28.66	▼3.9
Registered electors		12,800		
Labour hold		Swing	▲1.45	

==== May 2018 ====
2018 (3 vacancies; new boundaries)
Party	Candidate	Votes	%	±%
Labour	Ben Clay	2,913	69.5	
Labour	Bev Craig*	2,853	68.1	
Labour	Azra Ali*	2,652	63.3	
Liberal Democrats	Andrea Timoney	747	17.8	
Liberal Democrats	Maria Turner	541	12.9	
Liberal Democrats	Mohamed Sabbagh	457	10.9	
Green	Lance Crookes	442	10.5	
Conservative	Samuel Baxter	291	6.9	
Conservative	Lexi Webster	241	5.8	
Conservative	Shahed Hossain	234	5.6	
Majority				
Turnout		4,191	32.6	
Labour win (new boundaries)				
Labour win (new boundaries)				
Labour win (new boundaries)				

==== May 2016 ====
2016
Party	Candidate	Votes	%	±%
Labour	Bev Craig*	2,291	63.20	
Liberal Democrats	Maria Theresa Turner	489	13.49	
UKIP	Liam Thomas Evans	460	12.69	
Green	Sam Darby	339	9.35	
Conservative	Sahed Hossain	46	1.27	
Majority		1,802	49.71	
Turnout		3,625	33.82	
Labour hold		Swing		

==== May 2015 ====
2015
Party	Candidate	Votes	%	±%
Labour	Carl Austin*	4,010	60.9	−2.1
Liberal Democrats	Maria Theresa Turner	1,235	18.8	−7.2
Green	Sam Darby	815	12.4	+6.3
Conservative	Shahed Hossain	524	8.0	+3.3
Majority		2,775	42.1	
Turnout		6,584	60.2	+20.4
Labour hold		Swing		

==== May 2014 ====
2014
Party	Candidate	Votes	%	±%
Labour	Azra Ali	2,055	55.65	+13.25
Green	Sam Darby	685	18.55	+14.55
Liberal Democrats	Ronan Stafford	684	18.52	−26.88
Conservative	Josh Lelliot	269	7.28	+2.4
Majority		1,370	37.10	
Turnout		3,693	33.76	
Labour gain from Liberal Democrats		Swing		

==== May 2012 ====
2012
Party	Candidate	Votes	%	±%
Labour	Bev Craig*	2,416	72.0	+48.3
Liberal Democrats	Grace Baynham	513	15.3	−49.5
Green	Sam Darby	262	7.8	+3.4
Conservative	Peter Schofield	163	4.9	−2.2
Majority		1,903	56.7	
Turnout		3,354	31.2	
Labour hold		Swing		

==== May 2011 ====
2011 (2 vacancies)
Party	Candidate	Votes	%	±%
Labour	Carl Austin	2,668	63.0	
Labour	Bev Craig	2,283		
Liberal Democrats	Grace Baynham	1,103	26.0	
Liberal Democrats	Iain Donaldson*	1,005		
Green	Dan Collinson	260	6.1	
Conservative	Jean Mee	203	4.8	
Conservative	Peter Schofield	196		
Majority		1,180	37.0	
Turnout		4,234	39.8	
Labour gain from Liberal Democrats		Swing		
Labour gain from Liberal Democrats		Swing		

==== May 2010 ====
2010
Party	Candidate	Votes	%	±%
Liberal Democrats	William David Fisher	2,735	45.4	−19.4
Labour	Carl Austin	2,552	42.4	+18.7
Conservative	Peter Malcolm Schofield	489	8.1	+1.0
Green	Dan Collinson	243	4.0	−0.4
Majority		183	3.0	−38.1
Turnout		6,019	57.6	+26.6
Liberal Democrats hold		Swing	-19.0	

=== Elections in 2000s ===
==== May 2008 ====
2008
Party	Candidate	Votes	%	±%
Liberal Democrats	John Cameron*	2,096	64.8	+10.5
Labour	Tom Murphy	768	23.7	−12.3
Conservative	Peter Schofield	228	7.1	+1.3
Green	Angela Tibke	142	4.4	+0.5
Majority		1,328	41.1	+22.8
Turnout		3,234	31.0	−1.0
Liberal Democrats hold		Swing	+11.4	

==== May 2007 ====
2007
Party	Candidate	Votes	%	±%
Liberal Democrats	Iain Donaldson*	1,825	54.3	+6.8
Labour	Frank Duffy	1,209	36.0	−2.0
Conservative	Peter Schofield	194	5.8	−2.4
Green	Joseph Gair	132	3.9	−0.9
Majority		616	18.3	+8.8
Turnout		3,360	32.0	+2.2
Liberal Democrats hold		Swing	+4.4	

==== May 2006 ====
2006
Party	Candidate	Votes	%	±%
Liberal Democrats	Rodney Alan Isherwood*	1,460	47.5	−10.4
Labour	Frank Oliver Duffy	1,169	38.0	+12.7
Conservative	Dorothy Helen Keller	252	8.2	−0.5
Green	Elindsay James	149	4.8	−3.2
Majority		291	9.5	−23.1
Turnout		3,073	29.8	−10.3
Liberal Democrats hold		Swing	-11.5	

==== June 2004 ====
2004 (3 vacancies; new boundaries)
Party	Candidate	Votes	%	±%
Liberal Democrats	John Cameron*	2,484	61.6	
Liberal Democrats	Iain Donaldson*	1,925	47.7	
Liberal Democrats	Rodney Isherwood	1,846	45.8	
Labour	Frank Duffy	1,085	26.9	
Labour	Bernard Selby*	964	23.9	
Labour	William Parbury	542	13.4	
Conservative	Gregory Stevens	373	9.2	
Green	Matthew Payne	344	8.5	
Green	Michael Shaw	263	6.5	
Green	Barry McAtarsney	230	5.7	
Majority		761	18.9	
Turnout		4,034	40.1	
Liberal Democrats win (new seat)				
Liberal Democrats win (new seat)				
Liberal Democrats win (new seat)				

==== May 2003 ====
2003
Party	Candidate	Votes	%	±%
Liberal Democrats	John Cameron	1,758	60.8	+18.7
Labour	Michael Green*	914	31.6	−14.7
Conservative	Peter Schofield	142	4.9	−3.6
Green	Michael Shaw	79	2.7	−0.5
Majority		844	29.2	+25.1
Turnout		2,893	29.1	+0.6
Liberal Democrats gain from Labour		Swing	+16.7	

==== May 2002 ====
2002
Party	Candidate	Votes	%	±%
Labour	Marilyn Taylor*	1,330	46.3	+0.9
Liberal Democrats	John Cameron	1,211	42.1	+15.2
Conservative	Peter Schofield	243	8.5	−9.2
Green	Michael Shaw	91	3.2	−6.8
Majority		119	4.1	−14.4
Turnout		2,875	28.5	+6.6
Labour hold		Swing	-7.1	

==== May 2000 ====
2000
Party	Candidate	Votes	%	±%
Labour	Kathleen Robinson*	956	45.4	−15.3
Liberal Democrats	John Cameron	567	26.9	+11.6
Conservative	Peter Schofield	372	17.7	−1.7
Green	Adrian Crawford	210	10.0	+6.6
Majority		389	18.5	−22.7
Turnout		2,105	21.9	+0.6
Labour hold		Swing	-13.4	

=== Elections in 1990s ===
==== May 1999 ====
1999
Party	Candidate	Votes	%	±%
Labour	Michael Green*	1,274	60.7	−2.3
Conservative	Peter Schofield	408	19.4	+0.9
Liberal Democrats	Robert Harrison	321	15.3	+0.1
Green	Michael Shaw	72	3.4	+0.1
Independent Labour	Michael Robinson	25	1.2	+1.2
Majority		866	41.2	−3.2
Turnout		2,100	21.3	
Labour hold		Swing	-1.6	

==== May 1998 ====
1998
Party	Candidate	Votes	%	±%
Labour	Marilyn Taylor*	1,345	63.0	−3.8
Conservative	Jeffrey Leach	396	18.5	+3.4
Liberal Democrats	Robert Harrison	325	15.2	−0.6
Green	Jane Hutchins	70	3.3	+3.3
Majority		949	44.4	−6.6
Turnout		2,136		
Labour hold		Swing	-3.6	

==== May 1996 ====
1996
Party	Candidate	Votes	%	±%
Labour	Kathleen Robinson	1,834	66.8	−4.8
Liberal Democrats	J. Parkinson	434	15.8	+1.1
Conservative	Christopher Brown	415	15.1	+3.9
Residents	C. Mumford	63	2.3	+2.3
Majority		1,400	51.0	−5.9
Turnout		2,746		
Labour hold		Swing	-2.9	

==== May 1995 ====
1995
Party	Candidate	Votes	%	±%
Labour	Michael Green	2,260	71.6	+11.6
Liberal Democrats	J. Parkinson	464	14.7	−0.4
Conservative	Jeffrey Leach	353	11.2	−8.6
Independent	Z. Elford	78	2.5	−2.6
Majority		1,796	56.9	+16.7
Turnout		3,155		
Labour hold		Swing	+6.0	

==== May 1994 ====
1994
Party	Candidate	Votes	%	±%
Labour	M. Taylor	2,308	60.0	+17.0
Conservative	J. Leach	761	19.8	−20.7
Liberal Democrats	J. Lawley	581	15.1	+1.9
Independent Labour	R. Whyte*	196	5.1	+5.1
Majority		1,547	40.2	+37.2
Turnout		3,846		
Labour gain from Independent Labour		Swing	+18.8	

==== May 1992 ====
1992
Party	Candidate	Votes	%	±%
Labour	A. Williams	1,363	43.0	−3.5
Conservative	J. Leach	1,282	40.5	+5.3
Liberal Democrats	R. Harrison	418	13.2	−1.2
Green	P. Thompson	104	3.3	−0.6
Majority		81	3.0	−8.3
Turnout		3,167		
Labour hold		Swing	-4.4	

==== May 1991 ====
1991
Party	Candidate	Votes	%	±%
Labour	R. Boyle	1,968	46.5	−7.0
Conservative	J. Leach*	1,491	35.2	+6.2
Liberal Democrats	R. Harrison	611	14.4	+2.3
Green	J. Foster	166	3.9	−1.5
Majority		477	11.3	−13.2
Turnout		4,236	41.3	
Labour gain from Conservative		Swing	-6.6	

==== May 1990 ====
1990
Party	Candidate	Votes	%	±%
Labour	R. Whyte*	2,481	53.5	+3.8
Conservative	M. Logan	1,345	29.0	−10.0
Liberal Democrats	S. W. Lawley	559	12.1	+2.7
Green	J. Foster	250	5.4	+3.5
Majority		1,136	24.5	+13.9
Turnout		4,635		
Labour hold		Swing	+6.9	

=== Elections in 1980s ===
==== May 1988 ====
1988
Party	Candidate	Votes	%	±%
Labour	J. Clegg*	2,546	49.7	+13.8
Conservative	A. Riley	2,001	39.0	−1.2
SLD	R. Taylor	483	9.4	−12.8
Green	E. F. Howard	96	1.9	+0.3
Majority		545	10.6	
Turnout		5,126		
Labour hold		Swing	+7.5	

==== May 1987 ====
1987
Party	Candidate	Votes	%	±%
Conservative	Jeffrey Leach	2,231	40.2	+15.3
Labour	Marilyn Taylor*	1,992	35.9	−12.9
SDP	Robert Harrison	1,231	22.2	+7.0
Green	Edwin Howard	90	1.6	+0.1
Majority		239	4.3	
Turnout		5,544		
Conservative gain from Labour		Swing	+14.1	

==== May 1986 ====
1986
Party	Candidate	Votes	%	±%
Labour	R. Whyte	2,412	48.8	−0.1
Conservative	L. Houston	1,231	24.9	−12.5
SDP	A. Muir	749	15.2	+1.5
Green	J. Foster	74	1.5	+1.5
Majority		1,181	23.9	+12.3
Turnout		4,943		
Labour gain from Conservative		Swing	+6.2	

==== May 1984 ====
1984
Party	Candidate	Votes	%	±%
Labour	J. Clegg	2,418	48.9	+4.8
Conservative	Ronald Nicholson	1,847	37.4	−3.4
SDP	Kenneth McKeon	678	13.7	−1.4
Majority		571	11.6	+8.3
Turnout		4,943		
Labour gain from Conservative		Swing	+4.1	

==== May 1983 ====
1983
Party	Candidate	Votes	%	±%
Labour	Marilyn Taylor	2,294	44.1	+7.7
Conservative	Ronald Nicholson*	2,121	40.8	+0.6
SDP	Kenneth McKeon	783	15.1	−8.3
Majority		173	3.3	
Turnout		5,198		
Labour gain from Conservative		Swing	+3.5	

==== May 1982 ====
1982 (3 vacancies; new boundaries)
Party	Candidate	Votes	%	±%
Conservative	John Kershaw	1,924	37.7	
Conservative	Horace Platt*	1,920	37.6	
Conservative	Ronald Nicholson	1,892	37.0	
Labour	Graham Martin*	1,743	34.1	
Labour	Marilyn Taylor	1,721	33.7	
Labour	John Wilson	1,618	31.7	
SDP	Christopher Muir	1,116	21.8	
SDP	Thomas Burgess	1,114	21.8	
Liberal	Margaret Boyle	1,096	21.5	
Majority		149	2.9	
Turnout		5,109	47.3	
Conservative win (new seat)				
Conservative win (new seat)				
Conservative win (new seat)				

==== May 1980 ====
1980
Party	Candidate	Votes	%	±%
Labour	G. J. Martin	2,503	49.8	+6.7
Conservative	R. Nicholson	2,045	40.7	−5.6
Liberal	C. Dowse	474	9.4	−1.2
Majority		458	9.1	
Turnout		5,022	44.1	−30.5
Labour gain from Conservative		Swing	+6.1	

=== Elections in 1970s ===
==== May 1979 ====
1979
Party	Candidate	Votes	%	±%
Conservative	H. Platt*	3,872	46.3	−14.3
Labour	A. Lister	3,604	43.1	+3.7
Liberal	G. Shaw	885	10.6	+10.6
Majority		268	3.2	−18.5
Turnout		8,361	74.6	+37.0
Conservative hold		Swing	-9.0	

==== May 1978 ====
1978
Party	Candidate	Votes	%	±%
Conservative	L. Howarth*	2,647	60.6	+1.1
Labour	K. Robinson	1,724	39.4	+7.1
Majority		950	21.7	−5.5
Turnout		4,371	37.6	
Conservative hold		Swing	-3.0	

==== May 1976 ====
1976
Party	Candidate	Votes	%	±%
Conservative	W. L. Lund*	2,966	59.5	+8.1
Labour	G. Stringer	1,609	32.3	−0.1
Liberal	G. Shaw	411	8.2	+10.7
Majority		1,357	27.2	+8.3
Turnout		4,986		
Conservative hold		Swing	+4.1	

==== May 1975 ====
1975
Party	Candidate	Votes	%	±%
Conservative	H. Platt*	2,405	51.4	−13.1
Labour	E. H. Spencer	1,518	32.4	−3.0
Liberal	F. Turner	759	16.2	+16.2
Majority		887	18.9	−10.1
Turnout		4,682		
Conservative hold		Swing	-5.0	

==== May 1973 ====
1973 (3 vacancies; reorganisation)
Party	Candidate	Votes	%	±%
Conservative	L. Howarth*	2,487	61.8	−1.6
Conservative	W. L. Lund*	2,477	61.6	−1.8
Conservative	H. Platt*	2,455	61.0	−2.4
Labour	A. Burns	1,367	34.0	−2.6
Labour	J. McKinnon	1,347	33.5	−3.1
Labour	L. R. Williams	1,328	33.0	−3.6
Majority		1,088	27.1	+0.3
Turnout		4,022		
Conservative hold		Swing		
Conservative hold		Swing		
Conservative hold		Swing		

==== May 1972 ====
1972
Party	Candidate	Votes	%	±%
Conservative	W. L. Lund*	2,746	63.4	+9.9
Labour	B. W. McColgan	1,583	36.6	−10.5
Majority		1,163	26.8	+21.2
Turnout		4,329		
Conservative hold		Swing		

==== May 1971 ====
1971 (3 vacancies; new boundaries)
Party	Candidate	Votes	%	±%
Conservative	H. Platt*	2,612	53.5	
Conservative	L. Howarth*	2,570	52.7	
Conservative	W. I. Lund*	2,569	52.7	
Labour	T. T. Farrell	2,296	47.1	
Labour	S. Corless	2,256	46.2	
Labour	P. Bednarski	2,087	42.8	
Communist	N. J. Gilroy	243	5.0	
Majority		273	5.6	
Turnout		4,878		
Conservative win (new seat)				
Conservative win (new seat)				
Conservative win (new seat)				

==== May 1970 ====
1970
Party	Candidate	Votes	%	±%
Conservative	L. Howarth	3,026	59.8	−1.4
Labour	S. H. Higgins	2,038	40.2	+16.5
Majority		988	19.6	−17.9
Turnout		5,064		
Conservative hold		Swing		

=== Elections in 1960s ===
==== May 1969 ====
1969
Party	Candidate	Votes	%	±%
Conservative	W. L. Lund*	2,788	61.2	−7.3
Labour	S. H. Higgins	1,082	23.7	+4.4
Liberal	P. J. Brindle	689	15.1	+2.9
Majority		1,706	37.5	−11.7
Turnout		4,559		
Conservative hold		Swing		

==== May 1968 ====
1968
Party	Candidate	Votes	%	±%
Conservative	H. Platt*	2,842	68.5	+1.0
Labour	J. F. Lilley	799	19.3	−4.8
Liberal	S. B. Downs	508	12.2	+3.8
Majority		2,043	49.2	+5.8
Turnout		4,149		
Conservative hold		Swing		

==== January 1968 (by-election) ====
By-election: 25 January 1968
Party	Candidate	Votes	%	±%
Conservative	W. L. Lund	1,795	62.8	−4.7
Labour	J. F. Lilley	620	21.7	−2.4
Liberal	S. B. Downs	445	15.5	+7.1
Majority		1,175	41.1	−2.3
Turnout		2,860		
Conservative hold		Swing		

==== May 1967 ====
1967
Party	Candidate	Votes	%	±%
Conservative	B. J. Cox*	2,899	67.5	+7.4
Labour	J. F. Lilley	1,035	24.1	−15.8
Liberal	S. B. Downs	359	8.4	N/A
Majority		1,864	43.4	+23.2
Turnout		4,293		
Conservative hold		Swing		

==== May 1966 ====
1966
Party	Candidate	Votes	%	±%
Conservative	D. J. Edwards*	2,826	60.1	+5.0
Labour	C. Stewart	1,879	39.9	+11.0
Majority		947	20.2	−6.0
Turnout		4,705		
Conservative hold		Swing		

==== November 1965 (by-election) ====
By-election: 11 November 1965
Party	Candidate	Votes	%	±%
Conservative	B. J. Cox	1,938	51.0	−4.1
Labour	C. Stewart	1,287	33.9	+5.0
Liberal	W. M Drape	575	15.1	−0.9
Majority		651	17.1	−9.1
Turnout		3,800		
Conservative hold		Swing		

==== May 1965 ====
1965
Party	Candidate	Votes	%	±%
Conservative	H. Platt*	2,988	55.1	+8.0
Labour	C. Stewart	1,568	28.9	−2.1
Liberal	W. M Drape	871	16.0	−5.9
Majority		1,420	26.2	+10.1
Turnout		5,427		
Conservative hold		Swing		

==== May 1964 ====
1964
Party	Candidate	Votes	%	±%
Conservative	G. Lord*	2,617	47.1	+9.7
Labour	B. Smith	1,721	31.0	+0.1
Liberal	A. T. Parkinson	1,219	21.9	−9.8
Majority		896	16.1	+10.4
Turnout		5,557		
Conservative hold		Swing		

==== May 1963 ====
1963
Party	Candidate	Votes	%	±%
Conservative	D. J. Edwards*	2,270	37.4	−1.4
Liberal	A. T. Parkinson	1,925	31.7	−5.9
Labour	C. W. Drew	1,879	30.9	+7.3
Majority		345	5.7	+4.5
Turnout		6,074		
Conservative hold		Swing		

==== May 1962 ====
1962
Party	Candidate	Votes	%	±%
Conservative	H. Platt*	2,224	38.8	−7.9
Liberal	W. Thorpe	2,149	37.6	+8.8
Labour	H. Conway	1,349	23.6	−0.9
Majority		75	1.2	−16.7
Turnout		5,722		
Conservative hold		Swing		

==== May 1961 ====
1961
Party	Candidate	Votes	%	±%
Conservative	G. Lord*	2,409	46.7	−5.1
Liberal	W. Thorpe	1,486	28.8	+8.6
Labour	H. Conway	1,267	24.5	−3.5
Majority		923	17.9	−5.9
Turnout		5,162		
Conservative hold		Swing		

==== May 1960 ====
1960
Party	Candidate	Votes	%	±%
Conservative	D. J. Edwards*	2,431	51.8	+1.5
Labour	W. S. Spink	1,314	28.0	−2.7
Liberal	H. Tobias	947	20.2	+1.2
Majority		1,117	23.8	+4.2
Turnout		4,692		
Conservative hold		Swing		

=== Elections in 1950s ===
==== May 1959 ====
1959
Party	Candidate	Votes	%	±%
Conservative	H. Platt*	3,115	50.3	−10.1
Labour	W. S. Spink	1,900	30.7	−11.5
Liberal	H. Tobias	1,178	19.0	N/A
Majority		1,215	19.6	+3.4
Turnout		6,193		
Conservative hold		Swing		

==== May 1958 ====
1958 (2 vacancies)
Party	Candidate	Votes	%	±%
Conservative	G. Lord*	3,284	60.4	+5.0
Conservative	H. Platt	3,176	58.4	+3.0
Labour	W. S. Spink	2,294	42.2	−2.4
Labour	H. Rowley	2,121	39.0	−5.6
Majority		882	16.2	+5.4
Turnout		5,438		
Conservative hold		Swing		
Conservative hold		Swing		

==== May 1957 ====
1957
Party	Candidate	Votes	%	±%
Conservative	D. J. Edwards*	3,000	55.4	−5.5
Labour	W. S. Spink	2,414	44.6	+5.5
Majority		586	10.8	−11.0
Turnout		5,414		
Conservative hold		Swing		

==== May 1956 ====
1956
Party	Candidate	Votes	%	±%
Conservative	L. W. Biggs*	3,068	60.9	−3.5
Labour	J. S. Goldstone	1,968	39.1	+3.5
Majority		1,100	21.8	−7.0
Turnout		5,036		
Conservative hold		Swing		

==== May 1955 ====
1955
Party	Candidate	Votes	%	±%
Conservative	G. Lord*	3,743	64.4	+8.2
Labour	M. E. Morley	2,073	35.6	−8.2
Majority		1,670	28.8	+16.4
Turnout		5,816		
Conservative hold		Swing		

==== May 1954 ====
1954
Party	Candidate	Votes	%	±%
Conservative	D. J. Edwards*	3,666	56.2	−2.9
Labour	D. Supree	2,855	43.8	+2.9
Majority		811	12.4	−5.8
Turnout		6,521		
Conservative hold		Swing		

==== May 1953 ====
1953
Party	Candidate	Votes	%	±%
Conservative	L. W. Biggs*	4,220	59.1	+3.0
Labour	L. L. Hanbridge	2,918	40.9	−3.0
Majority		1,302	18.2	+6.0
Turnout		7,138		
Conservative hold		Swing		

==== May 1952 ====
1952
Party	Candidate	Votes	%	±%
Conservative	G. Lord	4,368	56.1	−9.8
Labour	J. Stuart Cole	3,420	43.9	+9.8
Majority		948	12.2	−19.6
Turnout		7,788		
Conservative hold		Swing		

==== May 1951 ====
1951
Party	Candidate	Votes	%	±%
Conservative	D. J. Edwards	4,860	65.9	+6.3
Labour	J. Barlow	2,517	34.1	−6.3
Majority		2,343	31.8	+12.6
Turnout		7,377		
Conservative hold		Swing		

==== May 1950 ====
1950
Party	Candidate	Votes	%	±%
Conservative	C. B. Walker*	4,349	59.6	
Labour	W. Frost	2,946	40.4	
Majority		1,403	19.2	
Turnout		7,295		
Conservative hold		Swing		

== See also ==
- Manchester City Council
- Manchester City Council elections
