= Eddy Newman =

British politician (born 1953)

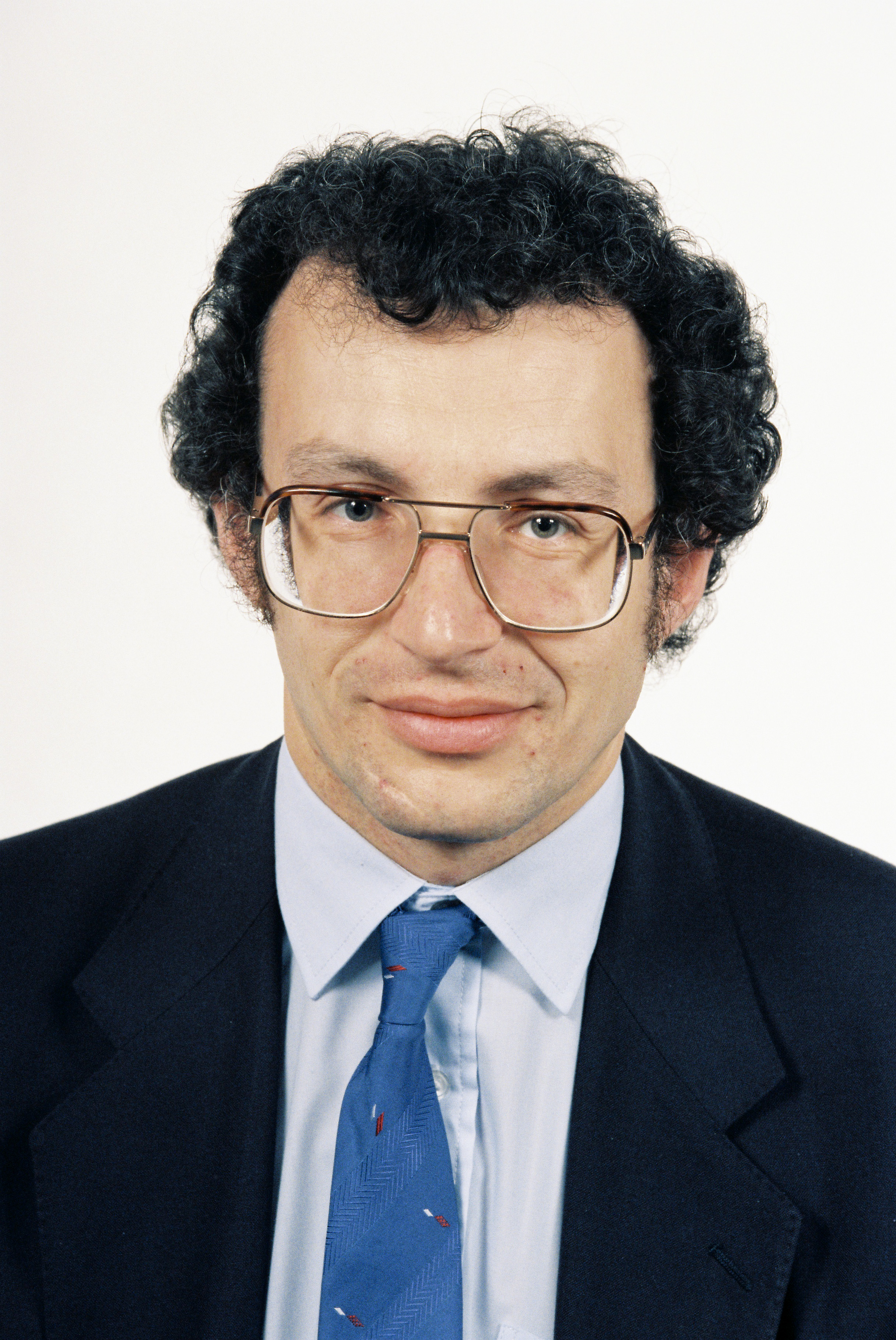
- Official MEP portrait

Member of the European Parliament
- In office 24 July 1984 – 19 July 1999
- Constituency: Greater Manchester Central

Personal details
- Born: 14 May 1953 (age 73) Liverpool, United Kingdom
- Party: Labour
- Spouse: Sheila Newman (died 2018)
- Children: 3 daughters
- Occupation: Politician

Edward "Eddy" Newman (born 14 May 1953) is a former British politician, who served as a Member of the European Parliament (MEP).

Newman worked in light engineering and then for the Post Office, including five years as a lay full time representative in the Union of Post Office Workers. He also became active in the Labour Party, and was elected to Manchester City Council in 1979. At the 1984 European Parliament election, he was elected to represent Greater Manchester Central. He was a member of the left wing Campaign Group, but resigned from it in 1995.

Newman was a councillor for Woodhouse Park on Manchester City Council between 2002 and 2023 and was Chair of the Wythenshawe Community Housing Group Board, as well as serving as Lord Mayor of Manchester for 2017–18. Newman's wife Sheila (born 1955) was also a councillor in the city, from 2004 to 2018, representing the Chorlton ward.

Honorary titles
Preceded by Carl Austin-Behan	Lord Mayor of Manchester; 2017–2018	Succeeded by June Hitchen
