= Carl Austin-Behan =

British politician and community activist

Carl Austin-Behan OBE DL

Member of Manchester City Council for Burnage
- Incumbent
- Assumed office 10 September 2026 Serving with: Asma Alam; Azra Ali
- Preceded by: Bev Craig
- Majority: 328 (10.1%)
- In office 5 May 2011 – 3 May 2018 Serving with: Azra Ali; Bev Craig
- Preceded by: William Fisher
- Succeeded by: Ben Clay

LGBT Adviser to the Mayor of Greater Manchester
- In office August 2018 – 31 July 2022
- Mayor: Andy Burnham

Lord Mayor of Manchester
- In office 13 May 2016 – 17 May 2017
- Preceded by: Paul Murphy
- Succeeded by: Eddy Newman

LGBTQ+ Ambassador for Greater Manchester to the LGBT Foundation
- Incumbent
- Assumed office August 2022

Personal details
- Born: Manchester, England
- Party: Labour
- Spouse: Simon Austin-Behan (m. 2015)
- Military career
- Allegiance: United Kingdom
- Branch: Royal Air Force
- Service years: 1991–1997
- Rank: Senior Aircraftman
- Units: RAF Chivenor Crash and Rescue Team
- Awards: Royal Humane Society Bronze Medal

Carl Jason Austin-Behan OBE DL is a British politician and community activist who served as the LGBT adviser to the Mayor of Greater Manchester from 2018 to 2022. He served as Lord Mayor of Manchester from May 2016 to May 2017, being its first openly gay Lord Mayor. He has served as Labour councillor for Burnage since September 2026, having previously served in the same role from 2011 to 2018.

He served in the Royal Air Force from April 1991 until October 1997 and in 2001, aged 29, he won Mr Gay UK.

== Early life and education ==
Austin-Behan was born in north Manchester and grew up in Crumpsall.

== Career ==
Austin-Behan was discharged from the Royal Air Force in 1997 for being gay at a time when it was illegal to be openly gay in the RAF.

Austin-Behan was elected to Manchester City Council as Labour Member for Burnage ward in May 2011. In 2016 he was made Lord Mayor of Manchester, and his term ended in May 2017. He was Manchester's first openly gay Lord Mayor and one of its youngest at 44. In November 2017 Labour deselected him as the Labour candidate for the local elections in May 2018. He said that he was "hurt, upset and gutted" to have been deselected in favour of Momentum candidate Ben Clay.

In August 2018, he was appointed the first ever LGBT advisor to the mayor of Greater Manchester. In July 2022, he left his role as LGBT advisor, and instead became an Ambassador for the LGBTQ+ Community in Greater Manchester to the LGBT Foundation.

In August 2026, Austin-Behan was selected as the Labour Party candidate for the Burnage ward by-election, following the resignation of Labour councillor Bev Craig after she was elected Mayor of Greater Manchester. At the Burnage ward by-election, Austin-Behan was reelected back to the Manchester City Council.

== Personal life ==
Austin-Behan married his partner of 12 years, Simon Behan in 2015. In May 2016 the Metro reported that the couple were in the process of adopting a child.

== Awards and honours ==
- RAF Safety Centre "Good Show" Award, Royal Air Force
- Bronze Medal from the Royal Humane Society, for rescuing a pilot from a burning Hawk aircraft
- 1996: Mention in the Queen's Birthday Honours, with a Commander in Chief's Commendation
- 2001: Winner, Mr Gay UK
- 2019: Appointed a Deputy Lieutenant of the County of Greater Manchester. This gave him the Post Nominal Letters "DL" for Life.
- 2019: Appointed Officer of the Order of the British Empire (OBE) in the 2020 New Years Honours List for services to charity, LGBTQ+ equality and the community in Greater Manchester.

== See also ==
- List of lord mayors of Manchester
- List of the first LGBT holders of political offices in the United Kingdom
- Timeline of LGBT history in the United Kingdom

Honorary titles
Preceded by Paul Murphy	Lord Mayor of Manchester; 2016–2017	Succeeded by Eddy Newman
