= 2014 Manchester City Council election =

2014 local election in England

- 22 May 2014

33 of 96 seats on Manchester City Council 49 seats needed for a majority
	First party
Party	Labour
Seats before	85
Seats won	33
Seats after	95
Seat change	▲10
Popular vote	66,611
Percentage	57.94%
Leader before election
Richard Leese
Labour
Leader following election
Richard Leese
Labour

The 2014 elections to Manchester City Council were held on 22 May 2014, on the same day as the 2014 United Kingdom local elections and the United Kingdom component of the 2014 European Parliament election. One-third of the council were up for election, with each successful candidate to serve a four-year term of office, expiring in 2018.

== Election result ==
Changes in vote share are compared to the 2012 election.

Manchester City Council
Party	This election				Full council			This election		
Party	Candidates	Seats	Net	Seats %	Other	Total	Total %	Votes	Votes %	+/−
Labour	{{{candidates}}}	33/33	▲10	100.0	63	95	98.9	66,611	57.94	▼7.79
Green	{{{candidates}}}	0/31	Steady	0.0	0	0	0.0	14,399	12.52	▲3.92
Liberal Democrats	{{{candidates}}}	0/31	▼9	0.0	0	0	0.0	13,134	11.13	▼3.57
Conservative	{{{candidates}}}	0/32	Steady	0.0	0	0	0.0	9,085	7.90	▲1.19
UKIP	{{{candidates}}}	0/12	Steady	0.0	0	0	0.0	8,700	7.57	▲5.33
TUSC	{{{candidates}}}	0/10	Steady	0.0	0	0	0.0	885	0.77	▼0.22
Independent	{{{candidates}}}	0/2	▼1	0.0	0	0	0.0	757	0.66	N/A
BNP	{{{candidates}}}	0/2	Steady	0.0	0	0	0.0	550	0.48	▼0.04
Liberal	{{{candidates}}}	0/1	Steady	0.0	0	0	0.0	383	0.33	N/A
Respect	{{{candidates}}}	0/2	Steady	0.0	0	0	0.0	249	0.22	▲0.05
Pirate	{{{candidates}}}	0/1	Steady	0.0	0	0	0.0	129	0.11	▼0.18
Christian Democrat Party for a Consensus	{{{candidates}}}	0/1	Steady	0.0	0	0	0.0	58	0.05	N/A
Motorcycle Alliance	{{{candidates}}}	0/1	Steady	0.0	0	0	0.0	33	0.03	N/A
Independent Labour	{{{candidates}}}	N/A	N/A	N/A	1	1	1.1	N/A	N/A	N/A

== Ward results ==
=== Ancoats and Clayton ===
Ancoats and Clayton
Party	Candidate	Votes	%	±%
Labour	Donna Ludford*	1,700	49.49	−5.31
UKIP	Josie Loftus	538	15.66	N/A
Liberal	Ken Dobson	383	11.15	N/A
Green	Larissa Claire Hansford	315	9.17	+1.37
Conservative	Beverley Atkins	230	6.70	−6.40
Pirate	Loz Kaye	129	3.20	N/A
Liberal Democrats	Chris Lovell	110	3.20	−21.20
TUSC	Alex Davidson	30	0.87	N/A
Majority		1,162	33.8	
Turnout		3,435	25.37	
Labour hold		Swing		

=== Ardwick ===
Ardwick
Party	Candidate	Votes	%	±%
Labour	Mavis Smitheman*	2,163	72.41	+14.11
Green	Harriet Pugh	348	11.65	+5.55
TUSC	Alexander Dunbar	207	6.93	N/A
Liberal Democrats	Mumina Yeasmin Tahir	152	5.09	−20.01
Conservative	Joey Ferrigno	117	3.92	−6.58
Majority		1,815	60.8	
Turnout		2,987	23	
Labour hold		Swing		

=== Baguley ===
Baguley
Party	Candidate	Votes	%	±%
Labour Co-op	Tracy Rawlins*	1,544	58.60	+11.50
UKIP	Ian George Fleming	602	22.85	+16.05
Conservative	Stephen Paul Woods	247	9.37	−6.83
Green	Frank Clements	116	4.40	+1.60
TUSC	Lynn Worthington	64	2.43	N/A
Liberal Democrats	Rhona Eva Elizabeth Brown	62	2.35	−22.15
Majority		942	35.7	
Turnout		2,635	23.47	
Labour hold		Swing		

=== Bradford ===
Bradford
Party	Candidate	Votes	%	±%
Labour	John Longsden*	2,215	70.74	+6.84
Green	George Czernuszka	367	11.72	+7.02
Conservative	Saira Khanum	296	9.45	−1.85
Liberal Democrats	Simon Mitchell	195	6.23	−13.77
Christian Democrat Party for a Consensus	Jonathan Cox	58	1.85	N/A
Majority		1,848	59	
Turnout		3,131	25.7	
Labour hold		Swing		

=== Brooklands ===
Brooklands
Party	Candidate	Votes	%	±%
Labour Co-op	Sue Murphy*	1,464	49.38	+3.18
UKIP	Anne Spoor	734	24.76	+19.56
Conservative	Ralph John Ellerton	507	17.10	−9.80
Green	Eithne Quinn	159	5.36	+2.46
Liberal Democrats	Joel Moorcroft	101	3.41	−15.19
Majority		730	24.6	
Turnout		2,965	27.38	
Labour hold		Swing		

=== Burnage ===
Burnage
Party	Candidate	Votes	%	±%
Labour	Azra Ali	2,055	55.65	+13.25
Green	Sam Darby	685	18.55	+14.55
Liberal Democrats	Ronan Stafford	684	18.52	−26.88
Conservative	Josh Lelliot	269	7.28	+2.4
Majority		1,370	37.10	
Turnout		3,693	33.76	
Labour gain from Liberal Democrats		Swing		

=== Charlestown ===
Charlestown
Party	Candidate	Votes	%	±%
Labour	Veronica Kirkpatrick*	1,741	54.65	+0.05
UKIP	Neil Griffiths	1,030	32.33	N/A
Conservative	Will Stobart	203	14.5	−8.13
Liberal Democrats	Martina Anne Dunican	65	2.04	−10.96
Majority		711	23.4	
Turnout		3,039	30.45	
Labour hold		Swing		

=== Cheetham ===
Cheetham
Party	Candidate	Votes	%	±%
Labour	Naeem Ul Hassan*	3,734	79.62	+25.82
Green	Alex Ian Blythe	530	11.30	N/A
Conservative	Stuart Andrew McKenna	426	9.08	−13.22
Majority		3,204	68.3	
Turnout		4,690	30.5	
Labour hold		Swing		

=== Chorlton ===
Chorlton
Party	Candidate	Votes	%	±%
Labour Co-op	John Hacking	2,675	54.98	+16.18
Green	Jake Welsh	1,002	20.60	+9.90
Liberal Democrats	Peter James Maxon	739	15.19	−28.41
Conservative	Zachery Husseini	286	5.88	−0.92
TUSC	Mark Bradley Krantz	163	3.35	N/A
Majority		1,673	34.4	
Turnout		4,865	44.34	
Labour gain from Liberal Democrats		Swing		

=== Chorlton Park ===
Chorlton Park
Party	Candidate	Votes	%	±%
Labour Co-op	Mandie Shilton-Goodwin	1,991	43.41	+11.01
Liberal Democrats	Norman Lewis*	1,691	36.87	−16.43
Green	Brian Candeland	648	14.13	+7.63
Conservative	Stuart Richardson	256	5.58	2.22
Majority		300	6.5	
Turnout		4,586	39.14	
Labour gain from Liberal Democrats		Swing		

=== City Centre ===
City Centre
Party	Candidate	Votes	%	±%
Labour Co-op	Beth Knowles	1,149	48.46	+16.96
Green	Rachel Carr	511	21.55	+15.25
Conservative	Nicholas Savage	442	18.64	=2.96
Liberal Democrats	John Richard Bridges	269	11.35	−29.25
Majority		638	26.9	
Turnout		2,371	17.2	
Labour gain from Liberal Democrats		Swing		

=== Crumpsall ===
Crumpsall
Party	Candidate	Votes	%	±%
Labour	Jon-Leigh Pritchard*	2,524	66.70	+8.80
UKIP	Bob Willescroft	588	15.54	+8.34
Conservative	Sham Raja Akhtar	392	10.36	−6.44
Green	Anne Vivienne Power	208	5.50	N/A
Liberal Democrats	Charles William Turner	72	1.90	−10.30
Majority		1,936	51.2	
Turnout		3,784	32.82	
Labour hold		Swing		

=== Didsbury East ===
Didsbury East
Party	Candidate	Votes	%	±%
Labour	James Wilson	1,968	43.18	+6.78
Liberal Democrats	Dominic Hardwick	1,375	30.17	−16.53
Green	Lucy Jane Bannister	405	8.89	+3.09
Conservative	Rob Manning	403	8.84	−2.36
UKIP	Mark Falcon Davies	369	8.10	N/A
TUSC	Sam Gleadon	38	0.83	N/A
Majority		593	13.0	
Turnout		4,558	41.6	
Labour gain from Liberal Democrats		Swing		

=== Didsbury West ===
Didsbury West
Party	Candidate	Votes	%	±%
Labour	Josie Teubler	1,457	46.27	+14.12
Liberal Democrats	Mark Clayton*	1,295	41.12	−9.07
Green	Glen Marsden	592	15.82	N/A
Conservative	David Robert Semple	397	12.61	−5.05
Majority		162	4.33	
Turnout		3,741	36	
Labour gain from Liberal Democrats		Swing		

=== Fallowfield ===
Fallowfield
Party	Candidate	Votes	%	±%
Labour	Mike Amesbury*	2,181	61.56	+30.57
Green	Catrin Louise Brock	780	22.02	+17.11
Conservative	Jack Murray	362	10.22	−1.44
Liberal Democrats	Dave Page	140	3.95	−29.13
TUSC	Zoe Frances Brunswick	80	2.26	N/A
Majority		1,401	39.5	
Turnout		3,543	30.62	
Labour hold		Swing		

=== Gorton North ===
Gorton North
Party	Candidate	Votes	%	±%
Labour	Nilofar Siddiqi*	2,016	62.09	
Green	Karl Wardlaw	516	15.89	
Liberal Democrats	Andrew Peter Hickey	428	13.18	
Conservative	John Wadsworth-Ladkin	287	8.84	
Majority		1,500	46.2	
Turnout		3,247	28.16	
Labour hold		Swing		

=== Gorton South ===
Gorton South
Party	Candidate	Votes	%	±%
Labour	Julie Reid*	2,548	60.44	
UKIP	Bob Catterall	787	18.67	
Liberal Democrats	Charles Leslie Glover	375	8.89	
Green	Martin Burke	369	8.75	
Conservative	Tmo Opesan	137	3.25	
Majority		1,761	41.8	
Turnout		4,216	31.74	
Labour hold		Swing		

=== Harpurhey ===
Harpurhey
Party	Candidate	Votes	%	±%
Labour	Sandra Collins	2,174	68.56	
Green	Mildred Willner	552	17.41	
Conservative	Tom Clarke	341	10.75	
Liberal Democrats	Bernadette Ryan	104	3.28	
Majority		1,622	51.2	
Turnout		3,171	25.3	
Labour hold		Swing		

=== Higher Blackley ===
Councillor Anna Trotman stood down for family reasons and was replaced in February 2016 by Paula Sadler, also of Labour in a by-election.

Higher Blackley
Party	Candidate	Votes	%	±%
Labour	Anna Margaret Trotman*	1,737	54.76	
UKIP	Martin Power	1,046	32.98	N/A
Conservative	Alexandru Stelian Stancu	194	6.12	
Green	James Sheppard	142	4.48	N/A
Liberal Democrats	Maria Theresa Turner	53	1.67	
Majority		691	21.8	
Turnout		3,172	34.58	
Labour hold		Swing		

=== Hulme ===
Hulme
Party	Candidate	Votes	%	±%
Labour	Nigel Joseph Murphy*	1,731	57.70	
Green	Deyika Nzeribe	706	23.53	
UKIP	Phil Eckersley	189	6.30	
Conservative	Harry Williams	182	6.07	
Liberal Democrats	Richard Gadsen	152	5.07	
TUSC	Conor Daniel Price	40	.1.33	
Majority		1,025	34.2	
Turnout		3,000	35	
Labour hold		Swing		

=== Levenshulme ===
Levenshulme
Party	Candidate	Votes	%	±%
Labour	Dzidra Noor	1,885	43.83	
Liberal Democrats	James Hennigan*	1,551	36.06	
Green	Dick Venes	718	16.69	
Conservative	Shaden Jaradat	147	3.42	
Majority		334	7.8	
Turnout		4,301	38.4	
Labour gain from Liberal Democrats		Swing		

=== Longsight ===
Longsight
Party	Candidate	Votes	%	±%
Labour	Suzanne Richards*	2,888	70.77	
Conservative	Mohammed Afzal	433	10.61	
Green	Ryan John Bestford	376	9.21	
Liberal Democrats	Liaqat Ali	275	6.74	
Independent	Mohammad Raisahmad Khan	109	2.67	
Majority		2,455	60.2	
Turnout		4,081	36	
Labour hold		Swing		

=== Miles Platting and Newton Heath ===
Miles Platting and Newton Heath
Party	Candidate	Votes	%	±%
Labour	John Flanagan*	1,826	65.24	
BNP	Gareth Black	397	14.18	
Green	Jake Lay	242	8.65	
Conservative	Benjamin John Michael Thacker	190	6.79	
Liberal Democrats	Grace Baynham	144	5.14	
Majority		1,429	51.1	
Turnout		2,799	25.82	
Labour hold		Swing		

=== Moss Side ===
Moss Side
Party	Candidate	Votes	%	±%
Labour	Emily Rowles	2,811	65.75	
Independent	Muhammad Anwar Shahzad	648	15.16	
Green	Clifford Fleming	463	10.83	
Conservative	Eleanor Hughes	143	3.35	
Respect	Colette Claire Williams	108	2.53	
Liberal Democrats	Lynne Williams	102	2.39	
Majority		2,163	50.6	
Turnout		4,275	31	
Labour hold		Swing		

=== Moston ===
Moston
Party	Candidate	Votes	%	±%
Labour	Yasmine Dar	1,543	42.55	
UKIP	Nigel F. Houston	1,406	38.78	
Conservative	Daniel Kallmunzer	321	8.85	
Green	Luke James Smith	203	5.60	
BNP	Stephen Carden	153	4.22	
Majority		137	3.8	
Turnout		3,626	31.38	
Labour hold		Swing		

=== Northenden ===
Northenden
Party	Candidate	Votes	%	±%
Labour	Sarah Russell	1,842	57.96	
Liberal Democrats	Mary Eileen Di Mauro*	514	16.17	
Conservative	Fiona Mary Green	471	14.82	
Green	Simon Edge	351	11.04	
Majority		1,328	41.8	
Turnout		3,178	28.03	
Labour gain from Liberal Democrats		Swing		

=== Old Moat ===
Old Moat
Party	Candidate	Votes	%	±%
Labour	Suzannah Mary Reeves*	1,924	56.91	
Green	Joel Smith	699	20.67	
Liberal Democrats	Christopher Kane	365	10.80	
Conservative	Peter Schofield	253	7.48	
TUSC	Jane Lee	107	3.16	
Motorcycle Alliance	James Gordon Torrance	33	0.98	
Majority		1,225	36.2	
Turnout		3,381	29.6	
Labour hold		Swing		

=== Rusholme ===
Rusholme
Party	Candidate	Votes	%	±%
Labour	Rabnawaz Akbar*	2,438	69.72	
Green	Joseph Ian Clough	517	14.78	
Liberal Democrats	Abu Mohiuddin Chowdhury	261	7.46	
Conservative	Georgina Elizabeth Calle	191	5.46	
TUSC	John William McFarlane	90	2.57	
Majority		1,921	54.9	
Turnout		3,497	32.3	
Labour hold		Swing		

=== Sharston ===
Sharston (2 Seats)
Party	Candidate	Votes	%	±%
Labour	Madeleine Monaghan	1,450		
Labour	Hugh Barrett*	1,406		
UKIP	Bob Burke	848		
Conservative	David Morgan	307		
Green	Alison Jane Hunt	216		
Liberal Democrats	John Frazer Yorke-Davenport	142		
Respect	Catherine Higgins	141		
Liberal Democrats	Robert Summerill	89		
Majority		558		
Turnout			23.3	
Labour hold		Swing		

=== Whalley Range ===
Whalley Range
Party	Candidate	Votes	%	±%
Labour	Mary Rose Watson*	2,959	64.31	
Green	Mary Candeland	883	19.19	
Liberal Democrats	John Grant	475	10.32	
Conservative	Shahed Hossain	284	6.17	
Majority		2,076	45.1	
Turnout		4,601	39.43	
Labour hold		Swing		

=== Withington ===
Withington
Party	Candidate	Votes	%	±%
Labour	Rebecca Moore	1,386	40.75	
Liberal Democrats	Simon David Wheale*	1,098	32.28	
Green	Laura Bannister	657	19.32	
Conservative	Peter Jacques Werner	194	5.70	
TUSC	Liam David Curless	66	1.94	
Majority		288	8.5	
Turnout		3,401	30.34	
Labour gain from Liberal Democrats		Swing		

=== Woodhouse Park ===
Woodhouse Park
Party	Candidate	Votes	%	±%
Labour	Edward Newman*	1,486	61.79	
UKIP	Tony Welch	563	23.41	
Conservative	Stephen James McHugh	177	7.36	
Green	May Molteno	123	5.11	
Liberal Democrats	Colin Anthony Bannister	56	2.33	
Majority		923	38.4	
Turnout		2,405	22.86	
Labour hold		Swing		
