= 2016 Manchester City Council election =

2016 local election in England

Manchester City Council Elections, 2016
- 5 May 2016

32 of 96 seats (One Third) to Manchester City Council 49 seats needed for a majority
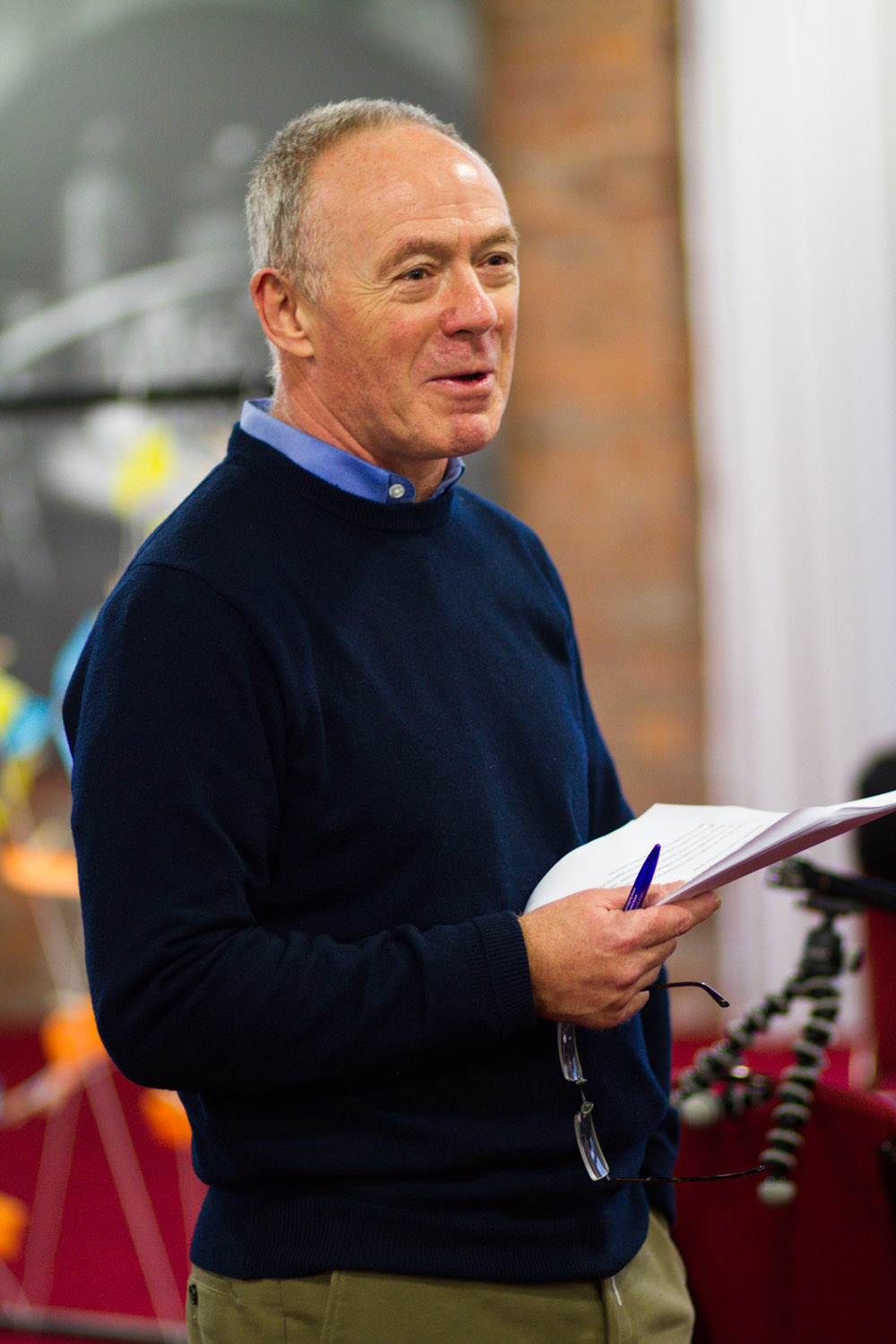

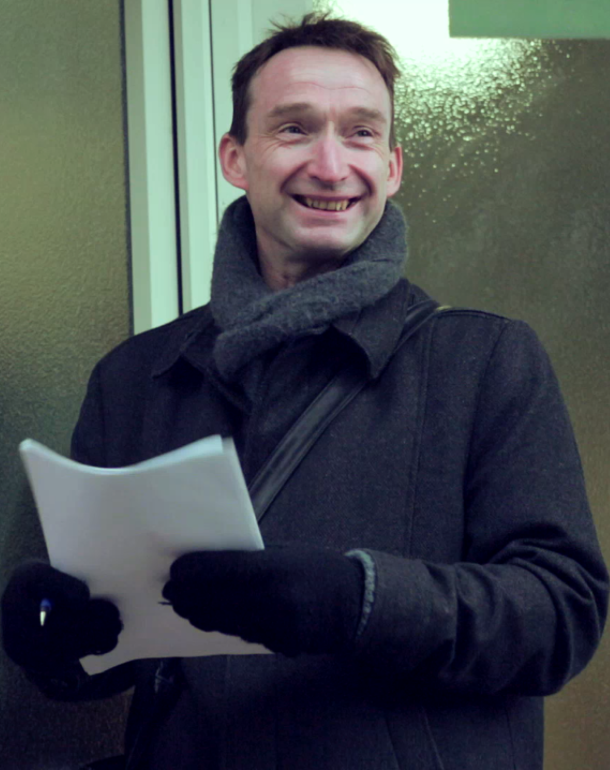
	First party	Second party
Leader	Richard Leese	John Leech
Party	Labour	Liberal Democrats
Leader since	20 May 1996	5 May 2016
Last election	32 seats, 65.7%	0 seats, 14.7%
Seats won	31	1
Seat change	▼1	▲1
Popular vote	68,668	11,920
Percentage	64.1%	11.1%
Swing	▼1.6%	▼3.6%
Leader of Largest Party before election
Richard Leese
Labour
Subsequent Leader of Largest Party
Richard Leese
Labour

Map of the results of the 2016 Manchester council election, with Labour in red and Liberal Democrats in yellow.

Elections to Manchester City Council were held on 5 May 2016. One third of the council was up for election, with each successful candidate serving a two-year term of office, expiring in 2018, due to planned boundary changes. The Labour Party retained overall control of the council, managing to hold all but one seat contested and won by former Withington MP, John Leech. Leech's win signified the first gain for any party in Manchester other than Labour for the first time in six years.

== Results summary ==
Changes in vote share are compared to the 2015 election.

2016 Manchester City Council election
Party	This election				Full council			This election		
Party	Candidates	Seats	Net	Seats %	Other	Total	Total %	Votes	Votes %	+/−
Labour	{{{candidates}}}	31/32	▼1	96.9	62	95	99.0	68,668	64.13	▲5.43
Liberal Democrats	{{{candidates}}}	1/32	▲1	3.1	0	1	1.0	11,920	11.13	▲1.50
Green	{{{candidates}}}	0/29	Steady	0.0	0	0	0.0	9,486	8.86	▼2.65
Conservative	{{{candidates}}}	0/32	Steady	0.0	0	0	0.0	7,475	6.98	▼3.87
UKIP	{{{candidates}}}	0/13	Steady	0.0	0	0	0.0	6,639	6.20	▼1.13
Independent	{{{candidates}}}	0/4	Steady	0.0	0	0	0.0	1,625	1.52	▲1.07
TUSC	{{{candidates}}}	0/16	Steady	0.0	0	0	0.0	974	0.91	▼0.43
Monster Raving Loony	{{{candidates}}}	0/3	Steady	0.0	0	0	0.0	223	0.21	▲0.13
Christian Democrat Party for a Consensus	{{{candidates}}}	0/1	Steady	0.0	0	0	0.0	57	0.05	▲0.01
Communist League	{{{candidates}}}	0/1	Steady	0.0	0	0	0.0	12	0.01	▼0.01

== Council Composition ==
Prior to the election the composition of the council was:

↓
96
Labour

After the election, the composition of the council was:

↓
95	1
Labour	LD

LD - Liberal Democrat

== Ward results ==
Asterisks denote incumbent Councillors seeking re-election. Councillors seeking re-election were elected in 2012, and results are compared to that year's polls on that basis. All results are listed below:

=== Ancoats and Clayton ===
Ancoats and Clayton
Party	Candidate	Votes	%	±%
Labour	Ollie Manco*	1,864	54.5	−19.8
Independent	Ken Dobson	941	27.5	n/a
Green	Steffeny Louise McGiffen	322	9.4	+0.8
Conservative	Denis Kostyan	164	4.8	−2.1
Liberal Democrats	Chris Wilkinson	130	3.8	−0.2
Majority		923	27.0	
Turnout		3,421	26.60	
Labour hold		Swing		

=== Ardwick ===
Ardwick
Party	Candidate	Votes	%	±%
Labour	Tarjuah Tina Hewitson*	2,086	80.9	+0.5
Conservative	Akbar Ali Arif	185	7.2	+2.0
Green	Kara Ng	156	6.1	−0.7
Liberal Democrats	Charles Richard George Gadsden	79	3.1	−1.6
TUSC	John Neill	73	2.8	−0.2
Majority		1,901	73.7	
Turnout		2,579	25.28	
Labour hold		Swing		

=== Baguley ===
Baguley
Party	Candidate	Votes	%	±%
Labour	Luke John Raikes*	1,579	64.8	+1.4
Conservative	Ralph John Ellerton	400	16.4	+5.3
Green	Bonnie Mercer	154	6.3	+2.0
TUSC	Lynn Worthington	127	5.2	+0.3
Monster Raving Loony	Lord Cameron of Roundwood	91	3.7	n/a
Liberal Democrats	Phil Stubbs	86	3.5	−0.9
Majority		858	35.2	
Turnout		2,437	22.60	
Labour hold		Swing		

=== Bradford ===
Bradford
Party	Candidate	Votes	%	±%
Labour	Emma Victoria Taylor	2,121	73.4	−4.3
Green	Rachel Harper	283	9.8	+4.0
Conservative	Michael Charles Barnes	249	8.6	+2.1
Liberal Democrats	Gary McKenna	105	3.6	−0.7
TUSC	Alexander Robert John Powell	75	2.6	n/a
Christian Democrat Party for a Consensus	Jonathan Cox	57	1.97	n/a
Majority		1,838	63.6	
Turnout		2,890	24.00	
Labour hold		Swing		

=== Brooklands ===
Brooklands
Party	Candidate	Votes	%	±%
Labour	Glynn Evans*	1,738	59.3	+5.6
UKIP	Pat Bebby	544	18.6	+9.4
Conservative	Stephen Paul Woods	504	17.2	−0.4
Liberal Democrats	Andrew McGuinness	145	5.0	+1.3
Majority		1,194	40.7	
Turnout		2,931	28.20	
Labour hold		Swing		

=== Burnage ===
Burnage
Party	Candidate	Votes	%	±%
Labour	Bev Craig*	2,291	63.2	+8.8
Liberal Democrats	Maria Theresa Turner	489	13.5	−1.8
UKIP	Liam Thomas Evans	460	12.7	n/a
Green	Sam Darby	339	9.4	+1.6
Conservative	Sahed Hossain	46	1.3	−3.6
Majority		1,802	49.7	
Turnout		3,625	33.82	
Labour hold		Swing		

=== Charlestown ===
Charlestown
Party	Candidate	Votes	%	±%
Labour	Hannah Kate Priest	1,671	59.4	−15.9
UKIP	Neil Caradoc Griffiths	770	27.4	n/a
Conservative	Nicholas David St John Savage	204	7.3	−3.9
Green	Astrid Johnson	92	3.3	−6.4
Liberal Democrats	Charles William Turner	77	2.7	−1.1
Majority		901	32.0	
Turnout		2,814	27.75	
Labour hold		Swing		

=== Cheetham ===
Cheetham
Party	Candidate	Votes	%	±%
Labour	Shaukat Ali*	3,485	81.8	+19.5
Conservative	Peter Malcolm Schofield	318	7.5	+2.8
Green	Dave Taylor	225	5.3	−0.4
Liberal Democrats	Arthur Craig Whittall	121	2.8	+/−0.0
TUSC	Catherine Spencer	112	2.6	n/a
Majority		3,167	74.3	
Turnout		4,261	29.19	
Labour hold		Swing		

=== Chorlton ===
Councillor Sheila Newman died suddenly 19 February 2018, three months prior to the 2018 local elections which she was due to stand in.

Chorlton
Party	Candidate	Votes	%	±%
Labour	Sheila Newman*	3,296	65.7	+8.9
Green	Nigel James Woodcock	778	15.5	+3.7
Liberal Democrats	Ludo Tolhurst-Cleaver	719	14.3	−4.3
Conservative	Colm George Lock	225	4.5	+0.3
Majority		2,518	50.2	
Turnout		5,018	47.00	
Labour hold		Swing		

=== Chorlton Park ===
Chorlton Park
Party	Candidate	Votes	%	±%
Labour	Joanna Rachel Midgley*	2,564	50.3	−5.9
Liberal Democrats	Norman Lewis	1,950	38.3	+8.2
Green	Hannah Lisa Richmond	412	8.1	−1.5
Conservative	Luke Oisin Bourke Costello	172	3.4	−0.8
Majority		614	12.0	
Turnout		5,098	45.17	
Labour hold		Swing		

=== City Centre ===
City Centre
Party	Candidate	Votes	%	±%
Labour	Joan Elizabeth Davies*	1,410	64.7	+26.3
Liberal Democrats	John Richard Bridges	403	18.5	−6.9
Conservative	Paul Wan	365	16.8	+4.0
Majority		1,007	46.2	
Turnout		2,178	22.15	
Labour hold		Swing		

=== Crumpsall ===
Crumpsall
Party	Candidate	Votes	%	±%
Labour	Richard Charles Leese*	2,704	74.4	−4.2
UKIP	Bob Willescroft	375	10.3	+3.3
Conservative	Sarah Idowu Ajiboye	288	7.9	+0.8
Green	Penny Miller-Swann	151	4.2	−0.7
Liberal Democrats	Iain Colin Donaldson	75	2.1	−0.3
TUSC	Martin Conway	44	1.2	n/a
Majority		2,329	64.0	
Turnout		3,637	32.79	
Labour hold		Swing		

=== Didsbury East ===
Didsbury East
Party	Candidate	Votes	%	±%
Labour	Kelly Suzanne Simcock	2,484	53.7	+3.2
Liberal Democrats	Dominic Hardwick	1,281	27.7	−6.9
Green	Wendy Ann Lynas	316	6.8	−1.1
Conservative	Robert George Manning	305	6.6	−0.3
UKIP	Mark Davies	236	5.1	n/a
Majority		1,203	26.0	
Turnout		4,622	44.00	
Labour hold		Swing		

=== Didsbury West ===
Didsbury West
Party	Candidate	Votes	%	±%
Liberal Democrats	John Leech	2,295	52.6	+21.6
Labour	Barnaby Edward Lane	1,593	36.5	−11.0
Green	Arnold James Spencer	244	5.6	−5.2
Conservative	Max Dowling	161	3.7	−4.7
UKIP	Robert Gutenfreund-Walmsley	69	1.6	−0.8
Majority		702	16.1	N/A
Turnout		4,362	44.40	
Liberal Democrats gain from Labour		Swing	+16.3	

- Leech's win signified the first gain for any party in Manchester other than Labour for the first time in six years and provided Manchester with its first opposition for two years.

Robert Gutenfreund-Walmsley stood in 2012 for the Democracy First party.

=== Fallowfield ===
Fallowfield
Party	Candidate	Votes	%	±%
Labour	Zahra Alijah	1,932	71.2	−6.7
Green	Laura Alice Bannister	408	15.0	+6.1
Conservative	Luke Aidan Dyks	197	7.3	+0.8
Liberal Democrats	Christopher Jones	125	4.6	+1.0
TUSC	Aidan Ryan Matthews	53	2.0	−1.2
Majority		1,524	56.1	
Turnout		2,715	24.74	
Labour hold		Swing		

=== Gorton North ===
Gorton North
Party	Candidate	Votes	%	±%
Labour	Afia Begum Kamal*	1,743	61.0	+8.0
UKIP	Katie Elizabeth Fanning	628	22.0	n/a
Liberal Democrats	Andrew Peter Hickey	194	6.8	−28.6
Conservative	Phelim Rowe	161	5.6	+2.0
Green	Karl Wardlaw	131	4.6	−2.1
Majority		1,115	39.0	
Turnout		2,857	26.80	
Labour hold		Swing		

=== Gorton South ===
Gorton South
Party	Candidate	Votes	%	±%
Labour	Bernard Eric Stone*	2,792	70.2	+16.4
UKIP	Bob Catterall	481	12.1	+6.9
Liberal Democrats	Sarah Louise Brown	246	6.2	−24.6
Green	Melvyn Newton	239	6.0	+1.8
Conservative	Tmo Opesan	141	3.5	+1.5
Independent	Martin Burke	80	2.0	n/a
Majority		2,311	58.1	
Turnout		3,979	31.28	
Labour hold		Swing		

=== Harpurhey ===
Harpurhey
Party	Candidate	Votes	%	±%
Labour	Patrick Charles Karney*	1,791	64.3	−11.9
UKIP	Mandy Michelle Howard	552	19.8	n/a
Conservative	Alexandru Stelian Stancu	166	6.0	−4.1
Green	Mary Rosalind Candeland	132	4.7	−4.5
Liberal Democrats	Rodney Alan Isherwood	102	3.7	−0.8
TUSC	Emma Windefride	42	1.5	n/a
Majority		1,239	44.5	
Turnout		2,785	23.50	
Labour hold		Swing		

=== Higher Blackley ===
Higher Blackley
Party	Candidate	Votes	%	±%
Labour	Shelley Margaret Lanchbury*	1,569	58.5	−9.0
UKIP	Martin Power	691	25.8	+18.2
Conservative	Barney Bradley Watson	202	7.5	−1.2
Liberal Democrats	Peter George Matthews	115	4.3	+0.5
Green	Anne Vivienne Power	104	3.9	+0.1
Majority		878	32.8	
Turnout		2,681	25.76	
Labour hold		Swing		

=== Hulme ===
Hulme
Party	Candidate	Votes	%	±%
Labour	Amina Lone*	1,726	65.3	+4.4
Green	Deyika Nzeribe	515	19.5	−8.3
Liberal Democrats	Hannah Jane Gee	184	7.0	+2.6
Conservative	Kevin Gerard O'Neill	162	6.1	+0.6
TUSC	Martin Shaw	56	2.1	n/a
Majority		1,211	45.8	
Turnout		2,643	25.30	
Labour hold		Swing		

=== Levenshulme ===
Levenshulme
Party	Candidate	Votes	%	±%
Labour	Nasrin Bibi Ali*	2,066	54.5	+4.2
Green	Dick Venes	764	20.2	+0.5
Independent	Mark Breeze	470	12.4	n/a
Liberal Democrats	Liaqat Ali	285	7.5	−20.4
Conservative	Calum Tudur James Davies	164	4.3	+2.2
TUSC	Joe McArdle	40	1.1	n/a
Majority		1,302	34.4	
Turnout		3,789	35.2	
Labour hold		Swing		

=== Longsight ===
Longsight
Party	Candidate	Votes	%	±%
Labour	Luthfur Rahman*	2,897	79.0	+3.0
Conservative	Anjnarra Huque	254	6.9	−5.1
Green	Vicky Matthews	219	6.0	−2.3
Liberal Democrats	Timothy Charles Crump	140	3.8	+0.1
Independent	Raees Ahmad Khan	134	3.7	n/a
TUSC	Mercedes Caccia Mesorio	24	0.7	n/a
Majority		2,643	72.1	
Turnout		3,668	36.4	
Labour hold		Swing		

=== Miles Platting and Newton Heath ===
Miles Platting and Newton Heath
Party	Candidate	Votes	%	±%
Labour	Carmine Geatano Grimshaw*	1,938	78.5	+13.5
Conservative	Harry Kagkouras	193	7.8	n/a
Green	Isobel Mary Patience	134	5.4	+0.2
Liberal Democrats	Richard Martin Kilpatrick	116	4.7	−25.1
TUSC	Bridget Taylor	88	3.6	n/a
Majority		1,745	70.7	
Turnout		2,469	24.12	
Labour hold		Swing		

=== Moss Side ===
Moss Side
Party	Candidate	Votes	%	±%
Labour	Mahadi Hussein Sharif Mahamed	2,869	74.3	−10.0
Green	Muhammad Anwar Shahzad	415	10.8	+5.7
Conservative	Aden Hassan	309	8.0	+4.0
Liberal Democrats	Annie Jackson	267	6.9	+4.3
Majority		2,454	63.6	
Turnout		3,860	29.20	
Labour hold		Swing		

=== Moston ===
Moston
Party	Candidate	Votes	%	±%
Labour	Carl Peter Ollerhead*	1,899	56.7	+2.9
UKIP	Phil Eckersley	899	26.8	n/a
Conservative	Hector James Robertson Williams	301	9.0	+1.3
Green	Eithne Quinn	118	3.5	+0.2
Liberal Democrats	Dave Page	102	3.04	n/a
TUSC	Jack Joseph Metcalf	33	0.98	n/a
Majority		1,000	29.8	
Turnout		3,352	30.28	
Labour hold		Swing		

=== Northenden ===
Northenden
Party	Candidate	Votes	%	±%
Labour	Mary Theresa Monaghan	2,003	64.1	−0.2
Conservative	Fiona Mary Green	541	17.3	+9.3
Green	Simon James Gray	308	9.9	+2.9
Liberal Democrats	Pablo O'Hana	166	5.3	−7.8
Monster Raving Loony	Johnny Disco	109	3.5	n/a
Majority		1,462	46.8	
Turnout		3,127	28.30	
Labour hold		Swing		

=== Old Moat ===
Old Moat
Party	Candidate	Votes	%	±%
Labour	Andrew Henryk Fender*	2,244	67.3	−6.8
Liberal Democrats	April Preston	561	16.8	+7.8
Green	Nathan Rae	329	9.9	−1.4
Conservative	Phillip Gallagher	138	4.1	−1.6
TUSC	Jane Elizabeth Lee	63	1.9	n/a
Majority		1,683	50.5	
Turnout		3,335	31.85	
Labour hold		Swing		

=== Rusholme ===
Rusholme
Party	Candidate	Votes	%	±%
Labour	Ahmed Ali*	2.346	75.1	+0.3
Green	Rob Jones	415	13.3	+5.5
Liberal Democrats	Abu Mohiuddin Chowdhury	195	6.3	−6.2
Conservative	Archie Stuart Galbraith	166	5.3	+1.9
Majority		1,931	61.9	
Turnout		3,122	31.24	
Labour hold		Swing		

=== Sharston ===
Sharston
Party	Candidate	Votes	%	±%
Labour	Tommy Judge*	1,645	61.8	−7.7
UKIP	Bob Burke	561	21.1	+10.9
Conservative	Jagdeep Singh Mehat	227	8.5	−0.6
Liberal Democrats	Bernie Ryan	100	3.8	−0.4
Green	Sylvia June Buchan	92	3.5	−0.3
Monster Raving Loony	Silly Sir Oink A-Lot	23	0.9	n/a
Communist League	Peter Clifford	12	0.5	n/a
Majority		1,084	40.8	
Turnout		2,660	23.00	
Labour hold		Swing		

=== Whalley Range ===
Whalley Range
Party	Candidate	Votes	%	±%
Labour	Angeliki Stogia*	3,091	63.8	−1.9
Green	Ben Godfrey	1,321	27.2	+16.1
Conservative	David Robert Semple	223	4.6	+1.3
Liberal Democrats	Rhona Eva Elizabeth Cowan Brown	169	3.5	−16.3
TUSC	Liam David	45	0.9	n/a
Majority		1,770	36.5	
Turnout		4,849	44.52	
Labour hold		Swing		

=== Withington ===
Withington
Party	Candidate	Votes	%	±%
Labour Co-op	Chris Wills	1,683	55.3	+8.7
Liberal Democrats	Simon David Wheale	844	27.7	−8.6
Green	Lucy Jane Bannister	370	12.2	+1.6
Conservative	Shaden Jaradat	113	3.7	+/−0.0
TUSC	Zoe Brunswick	36	1.2	n/a
Majority		839	27.5	
Turnout		3,046	31.47	
Labour hold		Swing		

=== Woodhouse Park ===
Woodhouse Park
Party	Candidate	Votes	%	±%
Labour	Brian Darral O'Neil*	1,548	68.2	−2.9
UKIP	Tony Welch	373	16.4	−2.7
Conservative	Eric Houghton	231	10.2	+2.9
TUSC	Laurie Joseph Carefoot	63	2.8	n/a
Liberal Democrats	Martha O'Donoghue	54	2.4	−0.1
Majority		1,175	51.8	
Turnout		2,269	22.25	
Labour hold		Swing		

== Changes between 2016 and 2018 ==
=== Rusholme by-election 4 May 2017 ===
The resignation of Labour councillor Kate Chappell in March 2017 triggered a by-election for Rusholme ward on 4 May:

Rusholme: 4 May 2017 (term ends 2018)
Party	Candidate	Votes	%	±%
Labour	Jill Lovecy	2,188	64.2	
Liberal Democrats	Amaan Hashmi	576	16.9	
Green	Anne Loveday Tucker	458	13.4	
Conservative	David Robert Semple	151	4.4	
TUSC	Jack Joseph Metcalf	37	1.1	
Majority		1,612	47.3	
Turnout		3,410	34.9	
Labour hold		Swing		

=== Fallowfield by-election 27 July 2017 ===
The resignation of Labour councillor Mike Amesbury in June 2017 (he was elected Member of Parliament for Weaver Vale) triggered a by-election in Fallowfield on 27 July:

Fallowfield: 27 July 2017 (term ends 2018)
Party	Candidate	Votes	%	±%
Labour	Ali Raza Ilyas	861	76.9	+15.3
Green	Adam Philip King	105	9.4	−12.6
Liberal Democrats	Alex Warren	82	7.3	+3.4
Conservative	David Robert Semple	72	6.4	−3.8
Majority		756	67.4	
Turnout		1,122	9.36	
Labour hold		Swing		

=== Changes that did not result in a by-election ===
Lady Mayoress and Labour councillor Shiela Newman (Chorlton) died suddenly on 18 February 2018. Her term would have ended in May.

Labour councillor Beth Knowles (City Centre) resigned from the council in March 2018. Her term would have ended in May.
