= Hulme (ward) =

- Ward
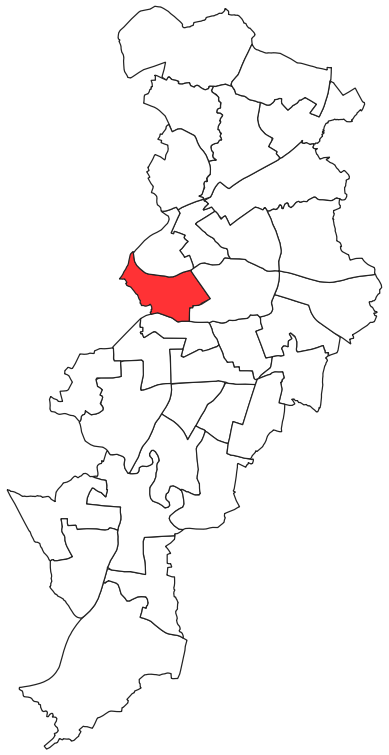
- Hulme ward (2018) within Manchester

- Coat of arms
- Country: United Kingdom
- Constituent country: England
- Region: North West England
- County: Greater Manchester
- Metropolitan borough: Manchester
- Created: May 1971
- Named for: Hulme

Government
  - Type: Unicameral
  - Body: Manchester City Council
- UK Parliamentary Constituency: Manchester Rusholme

Hulme is an electoral division of Manchester City Council which has been represented since 1971. It covers Hulme and parts of Chorlton-on-Medlock.

== Overview ==
Hulme ward was created in 1971, covering parts of the former All Saints', St. George's, and St. Peter's wards. In 1982, the ward's eastern boundary moved from Upper Brook Street to Oxford Road, and its southern boundary became Moss Lane East. A further city-wide boundary revision in 2004, transferred the area surrounding the Manchester Royal Infirmary and Whitworth Park to the Moss Side ward. The ward's boundaries were left largely unchanged at the latest revision in 2018.

From its creation until 1974, the ward formed part of the Manchester Exchange Parliamentary constituency. From 1974 until 1983, it was part of the Manchester Moss Side Parliamentary constituency. From 1983 until 2024, it was part of the Manchester Central Parliamentary constituency. Since 2024, it has formed part of the Manchester Rusholme Parliamentary constituency.

== Councillors ==
Election	Councillor	Councillor	Councillor
1971	G. Mann (Lab)	T. Thomas (Lab)	F. Hatton (Lab)
July 1971	G. M. Morton (Lab)	T. Thomas (Lab)	A. P. Marino (Lab)
1972	G. M. Morton (Lab)	T. Thomas (Lab)	A. P. Marino (Lab)
1973	J. V. Marshall (Lab)	T. Thomas (Lab)	W. Smith (Lab)
1975	J. V. Marshall (Lab)	T. Thomas (Lab)	W. Smith (Lab)
1976	J. V. Marshall (Lab)	T. Thomas (Lab)	W. Smith (Lab)
1978	J. V. Marshall (Lab)	T. Thomas (Lab)	W. Smith (Lab)
1979	J. V. Marshall (Lab)	T. Thomas (Lab)	W. Smith (Lab)
1980	J. V. Marshall (Lab)	T. Thomas (Lab)	W. Smith (Lab)
November 1981	J. V. Marshall (Lab)	T. Thomas (SDP)	W. Smith (Lab)
1982	P. Keenlyside (Lab)	V. Dunn (Lab)	S. Robertson (Lab)
1983	P. Keenlyside (Lab)	V. Dunn (Lab)	S. Robertson (Lab)
1984	P. Keenlyside (Lab)	V. Dunn (Lab)	S. Robertson (Lab)
1986	D. Lunts (Lab)	V. Dunn (Lab)	S. Robertson (Lab)
1987	D. Lunts (Lab)	V. Dunn (Lab)	M. Kelly (Lab)
1988	D. Lunts (Lab)	V. Dunn (Lab)	H. Johnson (Lab)
1990	M. Hood (Lab)	V. Dunn (Lab)	H. Johnson (Lab)
1991	M. Hood (Lab)	V. Dunn (Lab)	P. R. Dungey (Lab)
1992	M. Hood (Lab)	K. Rowswell (Lab)	P. R. Dungey (Lab)
1994	D. Lunts (Lab)	K. Rowswell (Lab)	P. R. Dungey (Lab)
1995	D. Lunts (Lab)	K. Rowswell (Lab)	P. R. Dungey (Lab)
1996	D. Lunts (Lab)	K. Rowswell (Lab)	P. R. Dungey (Lab)
May 1997	M. Murphy (Lab)	K. Rowswell (Lab)	P. R. Dungey (Lab)
1998	M. Murphy (Lab)	K. Rowswell (Lab)	P. R. Dungey (Lab)
1999	M. Murphy (Lab)	K. Rowswell (Lab)	J. Flanagan (Lab)
2000	M. Murphy (Lab)	G. Diamond (Lab)	J. Flanagan (Lab)
2002	M. Murphy (Lab)	G. Diamond (Lab)	J. Flanagan (Lab)
2003	M. Murphy (Lab)	G. Diamond (Lab)	V. Hall (Grn)
2004	Vanessa Hall (Grn)	Mary Murphy (Lab)	Gerry Diamond (Lab)
2006	Vanessa Hall (Grn)	Mary Murphy (Lab)	Gerry Diamond (Lab)
2007	Vanessa Hall (Grn)	Mary Murphy (Lab)	Gerry Diamond (Lab)
2008	Emily Lomax (Lab)	Mary Murphy (Lab)	Gerry Diamond (Lab)
2010	Emily Lomax (Lab)	Mary Murphy (Lab)	Nigel Murphy (Lab)
November 2010	Amina Lone (Lab)	Mary Murphy (Lab)	Nigel Murphy (Lab)
2011	Amina Lone (Lab)	Mary Murphy (Lab)	Nigel Murphy (Lab)
2012	Amina Lone (Lab)	Mary Murphy (Lab)	Nigel Murphy (Lab)
2014	Amina Lone (Lab)	Mary Murphy (Lab)	Nigel Murphy (Lab)
2015	Amina Lone (Lab)	Lee-Ann Igbon (Lab)	Nigel Murphy (Lab)
2016	Amina Lone (Lab)	Lee-Ann Igbon (Lab)	Nigel Murphy (Lab)
2018	Lee-Ann Igbon (Lab)	Nigel Murphy (Lab)	Annette Wright (Lab)
2019	Lee-Ann Igbon (Lab)	Nigel Murphy (Lab)	Annette Wright (Lab)
2021	Lee-Ann Igbon (Lab)	Ekua Bayunu (Lab)	Annette Wright (Lab)
2022	Lee-Ann Igbon (Lab)	Ekua Bayunu (Lab)	Annette Wright (Lab)
July 2022	Lee-Ann Igbon (Lab)	Ekua Bayunu (Grn)	Annette Wright (Lab)
2023	Lee-Ann Igbon (Lab)	Ekua Bayunu (Grn)	Annette Wright (Lab)
2024	Lee-Ann Igbon (Lab)	Lee Glover (Lab)	Annette Wright (Lab)
2026	Bernard Ekbery (Grn)	Lee Glover (Lab)	Annette Wright (Lab)

== Elections ==
=== Elections in 2020s ===
==== May 2026 ====
2026
Party	Candidate	Votes	%	±%
Green	Bernard Ekbery	2,059	54.8	+39.7
Labour	Lee-Ann Igbon*	1,257	33.5	−38.3
Reform	Nigel Slack	285	7.6	N/A
Liberal Democrats	Robin Grayson	156	4.2	−2.3
Majority		802	21.3	N/A
Turnout		3,757	29.0	+8.9
Green gain from Labour		Swing		

==== May 2024 ====
2024
Party	Candidate	Votes	%	±%
Labour	Lee Glover	1,845	58.4	10.6 ▼
Green	Ekua Bayunu*	1,018	32.2	14.4 ▲
Conservative	Yat Fung Cheung	172	5.4	1.1 ▼
Liberal Democrats	Joe Lynch	126	4.0	2.7 ▼
Majority		827	26.2	
Rejected ballots		40	1.3	
Turnout		3,201	24.81	
Registered electors		12,903		
Labour gain from Green		Swing	12.5 ▼	

==== May 2023 ====
2023
Party	Candidate	Votes	%	±%
Labour Co-op	Annette Wright*	1,866	70.6	8.5▲
Green	Chris Ogden	501	19.0	6.2▼
Conservative	Samuel Stephenson	158	6.0	0.6▼
Liberal Democrats	Bernadette Ryan	117	4.4	2.2▼
Majority		1,365	51.7	
Rejected ballots		18		
Turnout		2,660	21.96	
Registered electors		12,115		
Labour Co-op hold		Swing		

==== May 2022 ====
2022
Party	Candidate	Votes	%	±%
Labour	Lee-Ann Igbon*	1,902	71.8	0.3 ▼
Green	Chris Ogden	401	15.1	4.5 ▼
Liberal Democrats	Gary McKenna	173	6.5	0.3 ▼
Conservative	William Watermeyer	151	5.7	1.2 ▼
Majority		1,501	56.7	
Rejected ballots		23		
Turnout		2,650	20.1	2.2 ▼
Registered electors		13,192		
Labour hold		Swing	2.1 ▲	

==== May 2021 ====
2021
Party	Candidate	Votes	%	±%
Labour	Ekua Bayunu	2,313	69.0	4.3 ▼
Green	Lottie Donovan	596	17.8	4.8 ▲
Liberal Democrats	Gary McKenna	223	6.7	0.6 ▼
Conservative	William Watermeyer	219	6.5	0.0
Majority		1,717	51.2	
Rejected ballots		38	1.1	
Turnout		3,389	26.5	4.2 ▲
Registered electors		12,804		
Labour hold		Swing	4.6 ▼	

=== Elections in 2010s ===
==== May 2019 ====
2019
Party	Candidate	Votes	%	±%
Labour	Annette Wright*	1,530	62.1	▲0.4
Green	Issy Patience	620	25.2	▲7.6
Liberal Democrats	Dániel Tóth-Nagy	163	6.6	Steady
Conservative	Jessica Beaumont	125	6.6	▲0.7
Majority		910	36.9	▼5.2
Rejected ballots		26	1.06	
Turnout		2464	21.60	▼0.7
Registered electors		11,408		
Labour hold		Swing	▼3.6	

==== May 2018 ====
2018 (3 vacancies; new boundaries)
Party	Candidate	Votes	%	±%
Labour	Lee-Ann Igbon*	1,913	72.1	
Labour	Nigel Murphy*	1,731	65.2	
Labour	Annette Wright	1,638	61.7	
Green	Melanie Horrocks	521	19.6	
Green	Dave James	413	15.6	
Conservative	Timothy Dawson	182	6.9	
Liberal Democrats	Richard Gadsen	180	6.8	
Liberal Democrats	James Ross	180	6.8	
Liberal Democrats	Thomas Mitchell	165	6.2	
Conservative	Phillip Page	152	5.7	
Conservative	Thomas Paterson	135	5.1	
Majority				
Turnout		2,653	22.3	
Labour win (new boundaries)				
Labour win (new boundaries)				
Labour win (new boundaries)				

==== May 2016 ====
2016
Party	Candidate	Votes	%	±%
Labour	Amina Lone*	1,726	65.3	+4.4
Green	Deyika Nzeribe	515	19.5	−8.3
Liberal Democrats	Hannah Jane Gee	184	7.0	+2.6
Conservative	Kevin Gerard O'Neill	162	6.1	+0.6
TUSC	Martin Shaw	56	2.1	n/a
Majority		1,211	45.8	
Turnout		2,643	25.30	
Labour hold		Swing		

==== May 2015 ====
2015
Party	Candidate	Votes	%	±%
Labour	Lee-Ann Mary Igbon	3,246	56.3	−1.1
Green	Dayika Nzeribe	1,490	25.9	+0.7
Conservative	Cynthia Kallmunzer	732	12.7	−2.4
UKIP	Phil Eckersley	218	3.8	N/A
TUSC	Conor Price	75	1.3	N/A
Majority		1,756	30.4	
Turnout		5,761	53.3	+29.2
Labour hold		Swing		

==== May 2014 ====
2014
Party	Candidate	Votes	%	±%
Labour	Nigel Joseph Murphy*	1,731	57.70	
Green	Deyika Nzeribe	706	23.53	
UKIP	Phil Eckersley	189	6.30	
Conservative	Harry Williams	182	6.07	
Liberal Democrats	Richard Gadsen	152	5.07	
TUSC	Conor Daniel Price	40	.1.33	
Majority		1,025	34.2	
Turnout		3,000	35	
Labour hold		Swing		

==== May 2012 ====
2012
Party	Candidate	Votes	%	±%
Labour	Amina Lone*	1,301	60.9	+18.7
Green	Deyika Nzeribe	595	27.8	−12.2
Conservative	Jack Kelly	117	5.5	−34.5
Liberal Democrats	Dom Hardwick	94	4.4	−3.9
Independent	James Guise	30	1.4	N/A
Majority		706	33	
Turnout		2,137	16.98	
Labour hold		Swing		

==== May 2011 ====
2011
Party	Candidate	Votes	%	±%
Labour	Mary Murphy*	1,689	57.4	−5.4
Green	Ruth Bergan	742	25.2	−7.4
Conservative	Jamie Williams	302	10.3	+4.0
Liberal Democrats	Andy Hardwick-Moss	211	7.2	−3.8
Majority		947	34.2	
Turnout		2,944	24.1	
Labour hold		Swing		

==== November 2010 (by-election) ====
By-election: 4 November 2010
Party	Candidate	Votes	%	±%
Labour	Amina Lone	1,031	60.6	+14.8
Green	Deyika Nzeribe	451	26.5	+4.5
Liberal Democrats	Grace Baynham	151	8.9	−14.1
Conservative	Will Stobart	67	3.9	−5.3
Majority		580	34.1	+11.3
Turnout		1,700	10.9	−35.4
Labour hold		Swing	+5.1	

==== May 2010 ====
2010
Party	Candidate	Votes	%	±%
Labour	Nigel Joseph Murphy*	2,445	45.8	+3.6
Liberal Democrats	Ian James Kimpton	1,229	23.0	+14.7
Green	Gayle Simms O'Donnovan	1,172	22.0	−18.0
Conservative	Amjad Nasir	490	9.2	−0.2
Majority		1,216	22.8	+20.6
Turnout		5,336	46.3	+24.6
Labour hold		Swing	-5.5	

=== Elections in 2000s ===
==== May 2008 ====
2008
Party	Candidate	Votes	%	±%
Labour	Emily Lomax	961	42.2	−7.9
Green	Steven Durrant	911	40.0	+7.4
Conservative	Jamie Hutchinson	215	9.4	+3.1
Liberal Democrats	Glenn Hinks	190	8.3	−2.7
Majority		50	2.2	−15.3
Turnout		2,277	21.7	+0.8
Labour gain from Green		Swing	-7.6	

==== May 2007 ====
2007
Party	Candidate	Votes	%	±%
Labour	Mary Murphy*	969	50.1	+12.2
Green	Steven Durrant	630	32.6	+7.6
Liberal Democrats	Oliver West	213	11.0	−15.7
Conservative	Andrew Binns	122	6.3	+1.7
Majority		339	17.5	+6.4
Turnout		1,934	20.9	−3.2
Labour hold		Swing	+2.3	

==== May 2006 ====
2006
Party	Candidate	Votes	%	±%
Labour	Nigel Joseph Murphy	816	37.9	+1.8
Liberal Democrats	Oliver West	576	26.7	+7.6
Green	Steven Jonathan Durrant	539	25.0	−12.4
Conservative	Paul Anthony Kierman	96	4.6	−2.7
Independent	Christine Anne Boscott-Shermerdine	53	2.5	+2.5
Independent	Captain Cae Os	43	2.0	+2.0
UKIP	Peter David Reeve	20	0.9	+0.9
Independent Liberal	Charles Anthony Lyn-Lloyd	11	0.5	+0.5
Majority		240	11.1	+9.8
Turnout		2,154	24.1	−1.5
Labour hold		Swing	-2.9	

==== June 2004 ====
2004 (3 vacancies; new boundaries)
Party	Candidate	Votes	%	±%
Green	Vanessa Hall*	856	37.9	
Labour	Mary Murphy*	825	36.5	
Labour	Gerry Diamond*	819	36.3	
Green	Christine Shelmerdine	730	32.3	
Labour	Paul Lock	634	28.1	
Green	Brian Candeland	553	24.5	
Liberal Democrats	Andrew Turvey	437	19.3	
Liberal Democrats	Shirley Inniss	345	15.3	
Liberal Democrats	Kevin Morley	295	13.1	
Conservative	Joyce Haycock	167	7.4	
Conservative	Cecilia James	150	6.6	
Conservative	Linda Mansell	145	6.4	
Majority		89	4.0	
Turnout		2,259	25.6	
Green win (new seat)				
Labour win (new seat)				
Labour win (new seat)				

==== May 2003 ====
2003
Party	Candidate	Votes	%	±%
Green	Vanessa Hall	678	43.3	+1.3
Labour	John Flanagan*	667	42.6	−5.3
Liberal Democrats	Andrew Turvey	160	10.2	+1.5
Conservative	Vincent Pierce	45	2.9	+1.5
Independent Liberal	Charles Lyn-Lloyd	16	1.0	+1.0
Majority		11	0.7	−5.1
Turnout		1,566	16.0	+1.2
Green gain from Labour		Swing	+3.3	

==== May 2002 ====
2002
Party	Candidate	Votes	%	±%
Labour	Mary Murphy*	680	47.9	−4.7
Green	Vanessa Hall	597	42.0	+4.6
Liberal Democrats	Matthew Armstrong	123	8.7	+8.7
Conservative	David Conway	20	1.4	−5.3
Majority		83	5.8	−9.3
Turnout		1,420	14.8	+4.2
Labour hold		Swing	-4.6	

==== May 2000 ====
2000
Party	Candidate	Votes	%	±%
Labour	Gerry Diamond	504	52.6	−2.7
Green	Vanessa Hall	359	37.4	+20.1
Conservative	David Conway	64	6.7	+0.9
Independent Liberal	Charles Lyn-Lloyd	32	3.3	+1.4
Majority		145	15.1	−20.4
Turnout		959	10.6	−3.0
Labour hold		Swing	-11.4	

=== Elections in 1990s ===
==== May 1999 ====
1999
Party	Candidate	Votes	%	±%
Labour	John Flanagan	644	55.3	−8.1
Liberal Democrats	Phylip Mahler	230	19.7	+8.7
Green	John Poole	202	17.3	+3.8
Conservative	David Conway	67	5.8	−1.9
Independent Liberal	Charles Lyn-Lloyd	22	1.9	−0.2
Majority		414	35.5	−14.4
Turnout		1,165	13.6	
Labour hold		Swing	-8.4	

==== May 1998 ====
1998
Party	Candidate	Votes	%	±%
Labour	Mary Murphy*	508	63.4	−10.6
Green	Melanie Jarman	108	13.5	+5.7
Liberal Democrats	James Graham	88	11.0	+3.5
Conservative	Paul Kierman	62	7.7	+0.5
Communist	Steve Riley	18	2.2	+2.2
Independent Liberal	Charles Lyn-Lloyd	17	2.1	−1.3
Majority		400	49.9	−16.2
Turnout		801		
Labour hold		Swing	-8.1	

==== May 1997 (by-election) ====
By-election: 2 May 1997
Party	Candidate	Votes	%	±%
Labour	Mary Murphy	1,937	69.4	−4.6
Liberal Democrats	James Graham	561	20.1	+12.5
Conservative	Paul Kierman	293	10.5	+3.3
Majority		1,376	49.3	−16.8
Turnout		2,791	51.1	
Labour hold		Swing	-8.5	

==== May 1996 ====
1996
Party	Candidate	Votes	%	±%
Labour	Kevin Rowswell*	708	74.0	−5.3
Green	Robin Goater	75	7.8	+7.8
Liberal Democrats	S. Oliver	72	7.5	+2.0
Conservative	Paul Kierman	69	7.2	+1.3
Independent Liberal	Charles Lyn-Lloyd	33	3.4	+1.3
Majority		633	66.1	−7.3
Turnout		957		
Labour hold		Swing	-6.5	

==== May 1995 ====
1995
Party	Candidate	Votes	%	±%
Labour	Peter Dungey*	832	79.3	+8.6
Conservative	Paul Kierman	62	5.9	−3.0
Liberal Democrats	A. Rogers	58	5.5	−4.2
Independent	A. Jones	39	3.7	+3.7
Independent	Rachel Harper	36	3.4	+3.4
Independent	Charles Lyn-Lloyd	22	2.1	+2.1
Majority		770	73.4	+13.4
Turnout		1,049		
Labour hold		Swing	+5.8	

==== May 1994 ====
1994
Party	Candidate	Votes	%	±%
Labour	D. Lunts	938	70.7	+2.4
Independent	C. Osigwe	142	10.7	+10.7
Liberal Democrats	S. Oliver	128	9.7	+1.9
Conservative	J. Baker	118	8.9	−4.5
Majority		796	60.0	+5.1
Turnout		1,326		
Labour hold		Swing	-4.1	

==== May 1992 ====
1992
Party	Candidate	Votes	%	±%
Labour	K. Rowswell	763	68.3	+0.0
Conservative	D. Williams	150	13.4	+3.6
Green	P. Williamson	117	10.5	−2.5
Liberal Democrats	I. Newton	87	7.8	−1.1
Majority		613	54.9	−0.4
Turnout		1,117		
Labour hold		Swing	-1.8	

==== May 1991 ====
1991
Party	Candidate	Votes	%	±%
Labour	P. R. Dungey	1,183	68.3	−4.1
Green	V. Greenfield	225	13.0	−2.6
Conservative	A. Pollitt	170	9.8	+3.0
Liberal Democrats	D. P. Rudge	155	8.9	+3.7
Majority		958	55.3	−1.5
Turnout		1,733	25.5	
Labour hold		Swing	-0.7	

==== May 1990 ====
1990
Party	Candidate	Votes	%	±%
Labour	M. Hood	1,629	72.4	+1.5
Green	P. E. Harrison	350	15.6	−0.2
Conservative	P. W. Davies	154	6.8	+0.0
Liberal Democrats	J. Mark	117	5.2	−1.2
Majority		1,279	56.8	+1.7
Turnout		2,250		
Labour hold		Swing	+0.8	

=== Elections in 1980s ===
==== May 1988 ====
1988 (2 vacancies)
Party	Candidate	Votes	%	±%
Labour	V. Dunn*	1,775	70.9	−1.9
Labour	H. Johnson	1,639		
Green	P. E. Harrison	395	15.8	+15.8
Conservative	A. Pollitt	171	6.8	+6.8
SLD	S. M. Jones	161	6.4	−20.8
Conservative	D. M. Powell	160		
SLD	C. Whettam	107		
Majority		1,244	55.1	+9.5
Turnout		2,502		
Labour hold		Swing		
Labour hold		Swing	-8.8	

==== May 1987 ====
1987
Party	Candidate	Votes	%	±%
Labour	Mary Kelly	1,859	72.8	−8.8
Liberal	Simon Jones	694	27.2	+17.5
Majority		1,165	45.6	−27.3
Turnout		2,553		
Labour hold		Swing	-13.1	

==== May 1986 ====
1986
Party	Candidate	Votes	%	±%
Labour	D. Lunts	2,080	81.6	+1.0
Liberal	H. Feazey	246	9.7	+2.4
Conservative	R. Lamptey	223	8.7	−3.4
Majority		1,857	72.9	+4.4
Turnout		2,549		
Labour hold		Swing	-0.7	

==== May 1984 ====
1984
Party	Candidate	Votes	%	±%
Labour	Valerie Dunn*	2,243	80.6	+5.3
Conservative	R. Lamptey	337	12.1	−0.7
Liberal	Simon Lewis	202	7.3	−4.6
Majority		1,906	68.5	+6.1
Turnout		2,782		
Labour hold		Swing	+3.0	

==== May 1983 ====
1983
Party	Candidate	Votes	%	±%
Labour	Sheila Robertson*	2,535	75.3	+12.2
Conservative	Clive Freemantle	432	12.8	+0.2
Liberal	David Nicholson	401	11.9	−12.4
Majority		2,103	62.4	+23.6
Turnout		3,368		
Labour hold		Swing	+6.0	

==== May 1982 ====
1982 (3 vacancies; new boundaries)
Party	Candidate	Votes	%	±%
Labour	Peter Keenlyside	2,105	60.9	
Labour	Valerie Dunn	1,992	57.7	
Labour	Sheila Robertson	1,931	55.9	
Liberal	Thomas McClure	811	23.5	
Liberal	Robert Taylor	707	20.5	
Liberal	David Nicholson	670	19.4	
Conservative	Grant Higginson	421	12.2	
Conservative	Peter Hardman	413	12.0	
Conservative	Clare Hare	388	11.2	
Majority		1,120	32.4	
Turnout		3,455	30.6	
Labour win (new seat)				
Labour win (new seat)				
Labour win (new seat)				

==== May 1980 ====
1980
Party	Candidate	Votes	%	±%
Labour	T. Thomas*	2,008	73.8	+5.2
Liberal	P. Thompson	329	12.1	+1.5
Conservative	N. P. Shand	295	10.8	−7.6
Independent	D. S. Redford	88	3.2	+3.2
Majority		1,679	61.7	+11.5
Turnout		2,720	29.3	−32.3
Labour hold		Swing	+1.8	

=== Elections in 1970s ===
==== May 1979 ====
1979
Party	Candidate	Votes	%	±%
Labour	W. Smith*	3,562	68.6	+11.1
Conservative	N. P. Shand	957	18.4	+3.5
Liberal	S. K. McClure	499	10.6	−3.7
Communist	R. W. Gwilt	174	3.4	+1.3
Majority		2,605	50.2	+12.8
Turnout		5,192	61.6	+32.2
Labour hold		Swing	+3.8	

==== May 1978 ====
1978
Party	Candidate	Votes	%	±%
Labour	J. V. Marshall*	1,488	57.5	−9.6
Liberal	P. Thompson	523	20.2	+5.8
Conservative	W. H. Cox	386	14.9	−3.7
Socialist Unity	B. Crossman	139	5.4	+5.4
Communist	R. W. Gwilt	54	2.1	+2.1
Majority		965	37.4	−11.1
Turnout		2,590	29.4	
Labour hold		Swing	-7.7	

==== May 1976 ====
1976
Party	Candidate	Votes	%	±%
Labour	T. Thomas*	1,514	67.1	−0.8
Conservative	L. Gaffney	419	18.6	−0.9
Liberal	M. Moonsamy	325	14.4	+4.0
Majority		1,095	48.5	+0.1
Turnout		2,258		
Labour hold		Swing	+0.0	

==== May 1975 ====
1975
Party	Candidate	Votes	%	±%
Labour	W. Smith*	1,262	67.9	−9.7
Conservative	G. B. Draycott	363	19.5	+2.1
Liberal	P. Davis	194	10.4	+10.4
Communist	R. H. Vaughan	39	2.1	−2.9
Majority		899	48.4	−11.8
Turnout		1,858		
Labour hold		Swing	-5.9	

==== May 1973 ====
1973 (3 vacancies; reorganisation)
Party	Candidate	Votes	%	±%
Labour	J. V. Marshall*	1,290	75.7	−13.4
Labour	T. Thomas*	1,273	74.7	−14.4
Labour	W. Smith*	1,226	71.9	−17.2
Conservative	A. Edwards	289	17.0	+6.1
Conservative	R. E. Gilham	260	15.3	+4.4
Conservative	E. Draycott	255	15.0	+4.1
Communist	D. J. Heywood	83	4.9	N/A
Majority		937	55.6	−22.6
Turnout		1,704		
Labour hold		Swing		
Labour hold		Swing		
Labour hold		Swing		

==== May 1972 ====
1972
Party	Candidate	Votes	%	±%
Labour	A. P. Marino*	2,101	89.1	+4.2
Conservative	R. J. R. Lomas	258	10.9	−3.0
Majority		1,843	78.2	+8.7
Turnout		2,359		
Labour hold		Swing		

==== July 1971 (by-election) ====
By-election: 8 July 1971 (2 vacancies)
Party	Candidate	Votes	%	±%
Labour	G. M. Morton	1,214	84.5	−0.4
Labour	A. P. Marino	1,211	84.3	−0.6
Liberal	A. G. Lishman	214	15.9	+6.3
Conservative	M. Meadows	142	9.9	−4.0
Conservative	R. Frere	92	6.4	−7.5
Majority		997	69.4	−0.1
Turnout		1,437		
Labour hold		Swing		

==== May 1971 ====
1971 (3 vacancies)
Party	Candidate	Votes	%	±%
Labour	G. Mann*	2,589	84.9	
Labour	T. Thomas*	2,554	83.7	
Labour	F. Hatton*	2,542	83.3	
Conservative	M. Meadows	423	13.9	
Conservative	J. H. Wood	376	12.3	
Liberal	A. G. Lishman	292	9.6	
Conservative	S. J. S. Bentley	290	9.5	
Communist	F. J. Cartwright*	85	2.8	
Majority		2,119	69.5	
Turnout		3,050		
Labour win (new seat)				
Labour win (new seat)				
Labour win (new seat)				

== See also ==
- Manchester City Council
- Manchester City Council elections
