= Moss Side (ward) =

- Ward
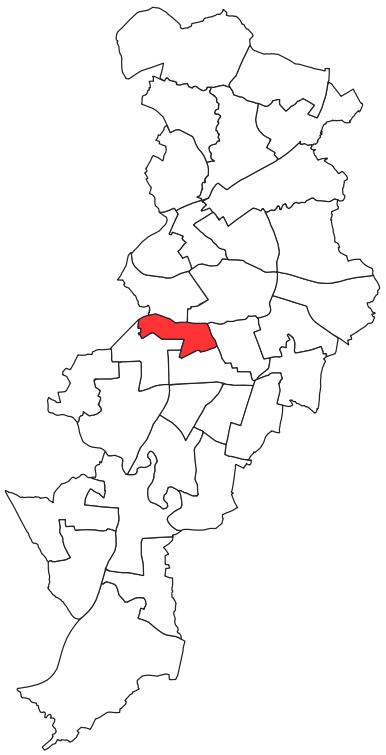
- Moss Side ward (2018) within Manchester

- Coat of arms
- Country: United Kingdom
- Constituent country: England
- Region: North West England
- County: Greater Manchester
- Metropolitan borough: Manchester
- Created: May 1971
- Named for: Moss Side

Government
  - Type: Unicameral
  - Body: Manchester City Council
- UK Parliamentary Constituency: Manchester Rusholme

Moss Side is an electoral division of Manchester City Council which has been represented since 1971. It covers Moss Side.

== Overview ==
Moss Side ward was created in 1971, covering parts of the former All Saints', Moss Side East, Moss Side West and St. George's wards. In 1982, the northern portion of the former Lloyd Street ward was transferred to the ward, and its northern boundary became Moss Lane East . A further city-wide boundary revision in 2004, the area surrounding the Manchester Royal Infirmary and Whitworth Park was transferred to the ward from the Hulme ward, that area was subsequently transferred to the Ardwick ward following the latest revision in 2018.

From its creation until 1983, the ward formed part of the Manchester Moss Side Parliamentary constituency. From 1983 until 1997, it was part of the Stretford Parliamentary constituency. From 1997 until 2024, it was part of the Manchester Central Parliamentary constituency. Since 2024, it has formed part of the Manchester Rusholme Parliamentary constituency.

== Councillors ==
Election	Councillor	Councillor	Councillor
1971	W. A. Downward (Lab)	H. P. D. Paget (Lab)	R. E. Talbot (Lab)
July 1971	D. Beetham (Lab)	H. P. D. Paget (Lab)	R. E. Talbot (Lab)
1972	D. Beetham (Lab)	H. P. D. Paget (Lab)	R. E. Talbot (Lab)
1973	R. E. Talbot (Lab)	H. P. D. Paget (Lab)	W. A. Downward (Lab)
1975	R. E. Talbot (Lab)	H. P. D. Paget (Lab)	R. Grainger (Lab)
1976	R. E. Talbot (Lab)	H. P. D. Paget (Lab)	R. Grainger (Lab)
1978	R. E. Talbot (Lab)	H. P. D. Paget (Lab)	R. Grainger (Lab)
1979	R. E. Talbot (Lab)	H. P. D. Paget (Lab)	J. Wilner (Lab)
1980	R. E. Talbot (Lab)	H. P. D. Paget (Lab)	J. Wilner (Lab)
1982	H. P. D. Paget (Lab)	A. Spencer (Lab)	J. Wilner (Lab)
1983	H. P. D. Paget (Lab)	A. Spencer (Lab)	S. Darby (Lab)
1984	H. P. D. Paget (Lab)	A. Spencer (Lab)	S. Darby (Lab)
1986	G. Ballance (Lab)	A. Spencer (Lab)	S. Darby (Lab)
1987	G. Ballance (Lab)	A. Spencer (Lab)	S. Darby (Lab)
1988	G. Ballance (Lab)	V. P. Young (Lab)	S. Darby (Lab)
1990	I. S. Sram (Lab)	V. P. Young (Lab)	S. Darby (Lab)
1991	I. S. Sram (Lab)	V. P. Young (Lab)	C. M. M. Nangle (Lab)
1992	I. S. Sram (Lab)	V. P. Young (Lab)	C. M. M. Nangle (Lab)
1994	V. Cunningham (Lab)	V. P. Young (Lab)	C. M. M. Nangle (Lab)
1995	V. Cunningham (Lab)	V. P. Young (Lab)	C. M. M. Nangle (Lab)
1996	V. Cunningham (Lab)	V. P. Young (Lab)	C. M. M. Nangle (Lab)
1998	R. Walters (Lab)	V. P. Young (Lab)	C. M. M. Nangle (Lab)
1999	R. Walters (Lab)	V. P. Young (Lab)	C. M. M. Nangle (Lab)
2000	R. Walters (Lab)	F. McCullough (Lab)	C. M. M. Nangle (Lab)
2002	W. Cox (Lab)	R. Walters (Lab)	C. M. M. Nangle (Lab)
2003	W. Cox (Lab)	R. Walters (Lab)	L. Brandy (Lab)
2004	William Cox (Lab)	Locita Brandy (Lab)	Roy Walters (Lab)
2006	William Cox (Lab)	Locita Brandy (Lab)	Roy Walters (Lab)
2007	William Cox (Lab)	Sameem Ali (Lab)	Roy Walters (Lab)
2008	William Cox (Lab)	Sameem Ali (Lab)	Roy Walters (Lab)
2010	William Cox (Lab)	Sameem Ali (Lab)	Roy Walters (Lab)
2011	William Cox (Lab)	Sameem Ali (Lab)	Roy Walters (Lab)
2012	William Cox (Lab)	Sameem Ali (Lab)	Roy Walters (Lab)
2014	William Cox (Lab)	Sameem Ali (Lab)	Emily Rowles (Lab)
2015	William Cox (Lab)	Sameem Ali (Lab)	Emily Rowles (Lab)
2016	Mahadi Mahamed (Lab)	Sameem Ali (Lab)	Emily Rowles (Lab)
2018	Sameem Ali (Lab)	Emily Rowles (Lab)	Mahadi Mahamed (Lab)
2019	Sameem Ali (Lab)	Emily Rowles (Lab)	Mahadi Mahamed (Lab)
2021	Sameem Ali (Lab)	Emily Rowles (Lab)	Mahadi Mahamed (Lab)
2022	Erinma Bell (Lab)	Emily Rowles (Lab)	Mahadi Mahamed (Lab)
2023	Erinma Bell (Lab)	Emily Rowles (Lab)	Mahadi Mahamed (Lab)
2024	Erinma Bell (Lab)	Esha Mumtaz (Lab)	Mahadi Mahamed (Lab)
2026	Thirza Asanga-Rae (Grn)	Esha Mumtaz (Lab)	Mahadi Mahamed (Lab)

== Elections ==
=== Elections in 2020s ===
==== May 2026 ====
2026
Party	Candidate	Votes	%	±%
Green	Thirza Asanga-Rae	2,371	56.5	+48.7
Labour	Erinma Bell*	1,356	32.3	−49.7
Reform	Martin McKinnon	189	4.5	N/A
Conservative	Jake Fountain	110	2.6	−4.1
Workers Party	Nadia Dara	108	2.6	N/A
Liberal Democrats	Lynne Williams	65	1.5	−1.3
Majority		1,015	24.2	N/A
Turnout		4,199	27.8	+7.3
Green gain from Labour		Swing		

==== May 2024 ====
2024
Party	Candidate	Votes	%	±%
Labour	Esha Mumtaz	1,763	44.5	37.3 ▼
Independent	Ali Guled Olad	988	25.0	New
Green	Thirza Amina Asanga-Rae	820	22.0	13.7 ▲
Conservative	Bhupinder Kumar	180	4.5	1.3 ▼
Liberal Democrats	Paul Anthony Jones	158	4.0	Steady
Majority		775	19.5	
Rejected ballots		43	1.1	
Turnout		3,952	26.88	
Registered electors		14,705		
Labour hold		Swing	31.1 ▼	

==== May 2023 ====
2023
Party	Candidate	Votes	%	±%
Labour	Mahadi Sharif Mahamed*	2,300	68.9	10.0 ▼
Green	Thirza Amina Asanga-Rae	707	21.2	10.4 ▲
Conservative	Michael Ciotkowski	179	5.4	1.9 ▲
Liberal Democrats	Robin Grayson	128	3.8	2.1 ▼
Majority		1,593	41.7	26.4 ▼
Rejected ballots		24	0.7	
Turnout		3,338	23.97	1.0 ▼
Registered electors		13,926		
Labour hold		Swing	10.2 ▼	

==== May 2022 ====
2022
Party	Candidate	Votes	%	±%
Labour	Erinma Bell	2,343	82.0	10.1 ▲
Green	Albie Mayo	224	7.8	2.7 ▼
Conservative	Samuel Stephhenson	192	6.7	2.1 ▲
Liberal Democrats	Phil White	79	2.8	2.5 ▼
Majority		2,119	74.2	
Rejected ballots		19		
Turnout		2,857	20.5	7.4 ▼
Registered electors		13,942		
Labour hold		Swing	6.4 ▲	

==== May 2021 ====
2021
Party	Candidate	Votes	%	±%
Labour	Emily Rowles*	2,883	81.8	5.7 ▼
Green	Albie Mayo	294	8.3	4.0 ▲
Conservative	Shaden Jaradat	204	5.8	1.7 ▲
Liberal Democrats	Norman Lewis	142	4.0	0.1 ▼
Majority		2,589	73.5	
Rejected ballots		53	1.5	
Turnout		3,576	26.0	1.9 ▼
Registered electors		13,745		
Labour hold		Swing	4.9 ▼	

=== Elections in 2010s ===
==== May 2019 ====
2019
Party	Candidate	Votes	%	±%
Labour	Mahadi Hussein Sharif Mahamed*	2,485	78.9	▲10.2
Green	Kristine Pearson	339	10.8	▲0.3
Liberal Democrats	Andrew Stevens	186	5.9	▲0.9
Conservative	Luke Costello	109	3.5	▲0.2
Majority		2,146	68.1	▲9.9
Rejected ballots		30	0.95	
Turnout		3,149	24.98	▼3.0
Registered electors		12,600		
Labour hold		Swing	▲4.95	

==== May 2018 ====
2018 (3 vacancies; new boundaries)
Party	Candidate	Votes	%	±%
Labour	Sameem Ali*	2,578	71.9	
Labour	Emily Rowles*	2,538	70.8	
Labour	Mahadi Mahamed*	2,462	68.7	
Green	Kirstine Pearson	376	10.5	
Liberal Democrats	Maria Guillermo	190	5.3	
Liberal Democrats	Christopher Kane	167	4.7	
Conservative	Mark Dippnall	165	4.6	
Conservative	Shazia Riaz	98	2.7	
Conservative	Aref Goojani	89	2.5	
Majority				
Turnout		3,586	27.9	
Labour win (new boundaries)				
Labour win (new boundaries)				
Labour win (new boundaries)				

==== May 2016 ====
2016
Party	Candidate	Votes	%	±%
Labour	Mahadi Hussein Sharif Mahamed	2,869	74.3	−10.0
Green	Muhammad Anwar Shahzad	415	10.8	+5.7
Conservative	Aden Hassan	309	8.0	+4.0
Liberal Democrats	Annie Jackson	267	6.9	+4.3
Majority		2,454	63.6	
Turnout		3,860	29.20	
Labour hold		Swing		

==== May 2015 ====
2015
Party	Candidate	Votes	%	±%
Labour	Sameem Ali*	5,286	78.2	−0.9
Green	Muhammed Anwar Osman	563	8.3	−0.2
Conservative	Denis Kostyan	459	6.8	+2.1
Liberal Democrats	Asad Abdi Osman	254	3.7	−4.0
TUSC	Emma Clark	201	3.0	N/A
Majority		4,723	69.9	
Turnout		6,763	54.3	+25.0
Labour hold		Swing		

==== May 2014 ====
2014
Party	Candidate	Votes	%	±%
Labour	Emily Rowles	2,811	65.75	
Independent	Muhammad Anwar Shahzad	648	15.16	
Green	Clifford Fleming	463	10.83	
Conservative	Eleanor Hughes	143	3.35	
Respect	Colette Claire Williams	108	2.53	
Liberal Democrats	Lynne Williams	102	2.39	
Majority		2,163	50.6	
Turnout		4,275	31	
Labour hold		Swing		

==== May 2012 ====
2012
Party	Candidate	Votes	%	±%
Labour	William Alistair Cox*	2,545	84.3	+16.3
Green	Richard Lane	153	5.1	−3.5
TUSC	Colette Williams	121	4.0	N/A
Conservative	Will Stobart	120	4.0	−3.1
Liberal Democrats	Richard Gadsden	79	2.6	−7.9
Majority		2,392	79	
Turnout		3,018	24.40	
Labour hold		Swing		

==== May 2011 ====
2011
Party	Candidate	Votes	%	±%
Labour	Sameem Ali*	2,738	79.1	+11.9
Green	Mosab Musbahi	295	8.5	−0.5
Liberal Democrats	Aidan Flood	268	7.7	−7.9
Conservative	Bolanle Ayadi	162	4.7	−3.6
Majority		2,443	70.5	
Turnout		3,463	29.3	
Labour hold		Swing		

==== May 2010 ====
2010
Party	Candidate	Votes	%	±%
Labour	Roy Blake Walters*	3,681	65.5	−2.5
Liberal Democrats	Ahmed Samatar	1,160	20.6	+10.1
Conservative	William Stobart	362	6.4	−0.7
Green	Nigel James Woodcock	306	5.4	−3.2
Independent	Colette Williams	109	1.9	+1.9
Majority		2,521	44.9	−12.8
Turnout		5,618	48.9	+24.3
Labour hold		Swing	-6.3	

=== Elections in 2000s ===
==== May 2008 ====
2008
Party	Candidate	Votes	%	±%
Labour	William Alistair Cox*	1,776	68.0	+0.8
Liberal Democrats	Zeke Ukairo	271	10.5	−5.1
Green	Nigel Woodcock	225	8.6	−0.4
Conservative	Kashif Ali	185	7.1	−1.2
Respect	Ali Shelmani	153	5.9	+5.9
Majority		1,505	57.7	+6.0
Turnout		2,610	24.6	+0.2
Labour hold		Swing	-2.9	

==== May 2007 ====
2007
Party	Candidate	Votes	%	±%
Labour	Sameem Ali	1,660	67.2	+3.5
Liberal Democrats	Zeke Ukairo	384	15.6	−3.1
Green	George Czernuszka	222	9.0	+0.4
Conservative	Peter Young	204	8.3	+4.0
Majority		1,276	51.7	+6.7
Turnout		2,470	24.4	−3.4
Labour hold		Swing	+3.3	

==== May 2006 ====
2006
Party	Candidate	Votes	%	±%
Labour	Roy Blake Walters*	1,734	63.7	+3.6
Liberal Democrats	Mohammad Hamza Butt	509	18.7	+1.1
Green	Robin Goater	235	8.6	+0.2
Independent	Reverend Juggla	129	4.7	−2.8
Conservative	Raymond Talbot Wattenbach	116	4.3	−2.1
Majority		1,225	45.0	+2.4
Turnout		2,723	27.8	−0.0
Labour hold		Swing	+1.2	

==== June 2004 ====
2004 (3 vacancies; new boundaries)
Party	Candidate	Votes	%	±%
Labour	William Alistair Cox*	1,638	57.2	
Labour	Locita Brandy*	1,602	55.9	
Labour	Roy Walters*	1,599	55.8	
Liberal Democrats	Shaheen Hussain	478	16.7	
Liberal Democrats	Ibrahim Elarifi	457	15.9	
Liberal Democrats	Abdulmagid Salih	426	14.9	
Green	Errol Flemmings	229	8.0	
Green	Adam Higgin	209	7.3	
Green	Paddy Wagon	206	7.2	
Independent	Anthony Weekes	205	7.2	
Conservative	Patricia Ainscough	176	6.1	
Independent	Samuel Brown	167	5.8	
Independent	Anthony Brown	165	5.8	
Conservative	Elizabeth Riley	158	5.5	
Conservative	Paul Kierman	142	5.0	
Majority		1,121	39.1	
Turnout		2,866	27.9	
Labour win (new seat)				
Labour win (new seat)				
Labour win (new seat)				

==== May 2003 ====
2003
Party	Candidate	Votes	%	±%
Labour	Locita Brandy	1,182	72.2	−3.6
Liberal Democrats	Shirley Inniss	234	14.3	+5.5
Conservative	Joyce Haycock	116	7.1	+1.4
Green	Brian Sheedy	104	6.4	+1.2
Majority		948	57.9	−9.1
Turnout		1,636	18.8	−3.5
Labour hold		Swing	-4.5	

==== May 2002 ====
2002 (2 vacancies)
Party	Candidate	Votes	%	±%
Labour	William Cox	1,510	75.8	+0.6
Labour	Roy Walters*	1,419		
Liberal Democrats	Pamela Davis	175	8.8	+0.2
Liberal Democrats	Keith Hodgkin	115		
Conservative	Mary Barnes	113	5.7	−4.5
Green	Bernard Ekbery	104	5.2	−0.8
Green	Jonathan Rummery	98		
Socialist Alliance	Robert Turnbull	90	4.5	+4.5
Conservative	Joyce Haycock	72		
Majority		1,244	67.0	+2.0
Turnout		1,992	22.3	+6.5
Labour hold		Swing		
Labour hold		Swing	+0.2	

==== May 2000 ====
2000
Party	Candidate	Votes	%	±%
Labour	Fergal McCullough	989	75.2	−2.1
Conservative	Mary Barnes	134	10.2	+1.1
Liberal Democrats	Peter Jinks	113	8.6	+1.8
Green	Michelle Allen	79	6.0	−0.8
Majority		855	65.0	−3.2
Turnout		1,315	15.8	−0.7
Labour hold		Swing	-1.6	

=== Elections in 1990s ===
==== May 1999 ====
1999
Party	Candidate	Votes	%	±%
Labour	Claire Nangle*	1,111	77.3	+1.0
Conservative	Mary Barnes	131	9.1	+0.3
Green	Vanessa Hall	98	6.8	+3.8
Liberal Democrats	Peter Jinks	98	6.8	−3.2
Majority		980	68.2	+1.9
Turnout		1,438	16.5	
Labour hold		Swing	+0.3	

==== May 1998 ====
1998
Party	Candidate	Votes	%	±%
Labour	Roy Walters	1,095	76.3	−3.2
Liberal Democrats	Doreen Dankyl	143	10.0	+2.3
Conservative	Mary Barnes	126	8.8	+1.2
Green	Teresa Romagnuolo	43	3.0	−2.3
Communist	John Pearson	29	2.0	+2.0
Majority		952	66.3	−5.5
Turnout		1,436		
Labour hold		Swing	-2.7	

==== May 1996 ====
1996
Party	Candidate	Votes	%	±%
Labour	Vince Young*	1,437	79.5	+3.3
Liberal Democrats	Richard Powell	139	7.7	+2.5
Conservative	Mary Barnes	137	7.6	−0.6
Green	Lucy Fogarty	95	5.3	−1.5
Majority		1,298	71.8	+3.8
Turnout		1,808		
Labour hold		Swing	+0.4	

==== May 1995 ====
1995
Party	Candidate	Votes	%	±%
Labour	Claire Nangle*	1,701	76.2	−2.5
Conservative	Mary Barnes	183	8.2	+1.3
Green	C. Collis	152	6.8	+0.3
Liberal Democrats	Lauriston Ford	117	5.2	−2.8
Independent	M. Miller	80	3.6	+3.6
Majority		1,518	68.0	−2.7
Turnout		2,233		
Labour hold		Swing	-1.9	

==== May 1994 ====
1994
Party	Candidate	Votes	%	±%
Labour	V. Cunningham	2,005	78.7	+4.3
Liberal Democrats	W. Tew	204	8.0	−9.2
Conservative	M. Barnes	175	6.9	+6.9
Green	K. Molteno	165	6.5	−1.8
Majority		1,801	70.7	+13.5
Turnout		2,549		
Labour hold		Swing	+6.7	

==== May 1992 ====
1992
Party	Candidate	Votes	%	±%
Labour	V. Young*	1,331	74.4	−8.4
Liberal Democrats	G. Neal	308	17.2	+9.6
Green	P. Boast	149	8.3	+8.3
Majority		1,023	57.2	−16.1
Turnout		1,788		
Labour hold		Swing	-9.0	

==== May 1991 ====
1991
Party	Candidate	Votes	%	±%
Labour	C. M. M. Nangle	2,382	82.8	+8.9
Conservative	M. G. Barnes	274	9.5	0
Liberal Democrats	I. C. Donaldson	220	7.6	+1.6
Majority		2,108	73.3	+8.9
Turnout		2,876	30.4	
Labour hold		Swing	+4.4	

==== May 1990 ====
1990
Party	Candidate	Votes	%	±%
Labour	I. S. Sram	2,567	73.9	−1.5
Conservative	M. Barnes	331	9.5	−5.4
Green	J. Sturrock	317	9.1	+5.6
Liberal Democrats	M. T. Rowles	209	6.0	−0.2
Independent	J. Shaoul	50	1.4	+1.4
Majority		2,236	64.4	+3.9
Turnout		3,474		
Labour hold		Swing	+1.9	

=== Elections in 1980s ===
==== May 1988 ====
1988
Party	Candidate	Votes	%	±%
Labour	V. P. Young	2,438	75.4	+5.3
Conservative	M. Barnes	482	14.9	−1.1
SLD	F. Griffiths	200	6.2	−7.7
Green	D. A. Howarth	112	3.5	+3.5
Majority		1,956	60.5	+6.4
Turnout		3,232		
Labour hold		Swing	+3.2	

==== May 1987 ====
1987
Party	Candidate	Votes	%	±%
Labour	Sam Darby*	2,653	70.1	−10.5
Conservative	Mary Barnes	605	16.0	+5.7
Liberal	Graham Shaw	527	13.9	+4.8
Majority		2,048	54.1	−16.2
Turnout		3,785		
Labour hold		Swing	-8.1	

==== May 1986 ====
1986
Party	Candidate	Votes	%	±%
Labour	G. Ballance	2,675	80.6	+2.2
Conservative	M. Barnes	342	10.3	−3.7
Liberal	S. Jones	302	9.1	+1.6
Majority		2,333	70.3	+5.9
Turnout		3,319		
Labour hold		Swing	+2.9	

==== May 1984 ====
1984
Party	Candidate	Votes	%	±%
Labour	A. Spencer*	2,764	78.4	+6.1
Conservative	Grant Higginson	495	14.0	−4.2
Liberal	Delsya Redford	265	7.5	−2.0
Majority		2,269	64.4	+10.3
Turnout		3,524		
Labour hold		Swing	+5.1	

==== May 1983 ====
1983
Party	Candidate	Votes	%	±%
Labour	Sam Darby	2,770	72.3	+9.8
Conservative	Grant Higginson	698	18.2	−5.4
Liberal	Sarah Barber	362	9.5	−1.5
Majority		2,072	54.1	+15.2
Turnout		3,830		
Labour hold		Swing	+7.6	

==== May 1982 ====
1982 (3 vacancies; new boundaries)
Party	Candidate	Votes	%	±%
Labour	Hugh Paget*	2,285	61.5	
Labour	Arnold Spencer	2,123	57.1	
Labour	Jeffrey Wilner*	1,969	53.0	
Conservative	Robert Taylor	863	23.2	
Conservative	Mary Barnes	795	21.4	
Conservative	Joan Goldsby	758	20.4	
Liberal	Sarah Barber	400	10.8	
SDP	Norman Allen	380	10.2	
Liberal	Lauriston Ford	362	9.7	
Workers Revolutionary	Frederick Marshall	106	2.9	
Majority		1,106	29.8	
Turnout		3,718	35.7	
Labour win (new seat)				
Labour win (new seat)				
Labour win (new seat)				

==== May 1980 ====
1980
Party	Candidate	Votes	%	±%
Labour	H. Paget*	1,626	75.9	+8.4
Conservative	J. M. Goldsby	349	16.3	−6.5
Liberal	L. Ford	167	7.8	−1.9
Majority		1,277	59.6	+14.9
Turnout		2,142	30.2	−33.3
Labour hold		Swing	+7.4	

=== Elections in 1970s ===
==== May 1979 ====
1979
Party	Candidate	Votes	%	±%
Labour	J. Wilner	2,630	67.5	−2.5
Conservative	J. M. Goldsby	888	22.8	+4.1
Liberal	D. Redford	380	9.7	−1.6
Majority		1,742	44.7	−6.5
Turnout		3,898	63.5	+36.3
Labour hold		Swing	-3.3	

==== May 1978 ====
1978
Party	Candidate	Votes	%	±%
Labour	R. E. Talbot*	1,360	70.0	+17.2
Conservative	S. Hussain	364	18.7	−2.7
Liberal	L. Ford	220	11.3	+11.3
Majority		996	51.2	+24.3
Turnout		1,944	27.2	
Labour hold		Swing	+9.9	

==== May 1976 ====
1976
Party	Candidate	Votes	%	±%
Labour	H. Paget*	980	52.8	+13.0
Independent	E. W. Smyth	480	25.8	+25.8
Conservative	P. Hilton	397	21.4	−2.0
Majority		500	26.9	+23.8
Turnout		1,857		
Labour hold		Swing	-6.4	

==== May 1975 ====
1975
Party	Candidate	Votes	%	±%
Labour	R. Grainger	482	39.8	−20.7
Independent	T. M. McClure	445	36.8	+36.8
Conservative	W. Guy	283	23.4	−10.2
Majority		37	3.1	−23.9
Turnout		1,210		
Labour hold		Swing	-28.7	

==== May 1973 ====
1973 (3 vacancies; reorganisation)
Party	Candidate	Votes	%	±%
Labour	R. E. Talbot*	928	66.5	−8.5
Labour	H. P. D. Paget*	889	63.7	−11.3
Labour	W. A. Downward*	789	56.6	−18.4
Conservative	M. J. Duffy	515	36.9	+11.9
Conservative	H. W. Meadowcroft	515	36.9	+11.9
Conservative	C. Toft	409	29.3	+4.3
Communist	W. Woolery	90	6.5	N/A
Majority		274	19.6	−30.4
Turnout		1,396		
Labour hold		Swing		
Labour hold		Swing		
Labour hold		Swing		

==== May 1972 ====
1972
Party	Candidate	Votes	%	±%
Labour	R. E. Talbot*	1,791	75.0	+4.1
Conservative	E. M. Bevan	596	25.0	−6.7
Majority		1,195	50.0	+12.8
Turnout		2,387		
Labour hold		Swing		

==== July 1971 (by-election) ====
By-election: 8 July 1971
Party	Candidate	Votes	%	±%
Labour	D. Beetham	1,766	76.5	+5.6
Conservative	W. B. Goodrick	541	23.5	−8.2
Majority		1,225	53.0	+15.
Turnout		2,307		
Labour hold		Swing		

==== May 1971 ====
1971 (3 vacancies)
Party	Candidate	Votes	%	±%
Labour	W. A. Downward*	2,665	70.9	
Labour	H. P. D. Paget*	2,613	69.5	
Labour	R. E. Talbot	2,594	69.0	
Conservative	W. B. Goodrick	1,194	31.7	
Conservative	R. E. Powell	1,068	28.4	
Conservative	E. M. Bevan	988	26.3	
Communist	W. Woolery	160	4.3	
Majority		1,400	37.2	
Turnout		3,761		
Labour win (new seat)				
Labour win (new seat)				
Labour win (new seat)				

== See also ==
- Manchester City Council
- Manchester City Council elections
