= Didsbury East =

Didsbury East (Manchester)
- Electoral ward
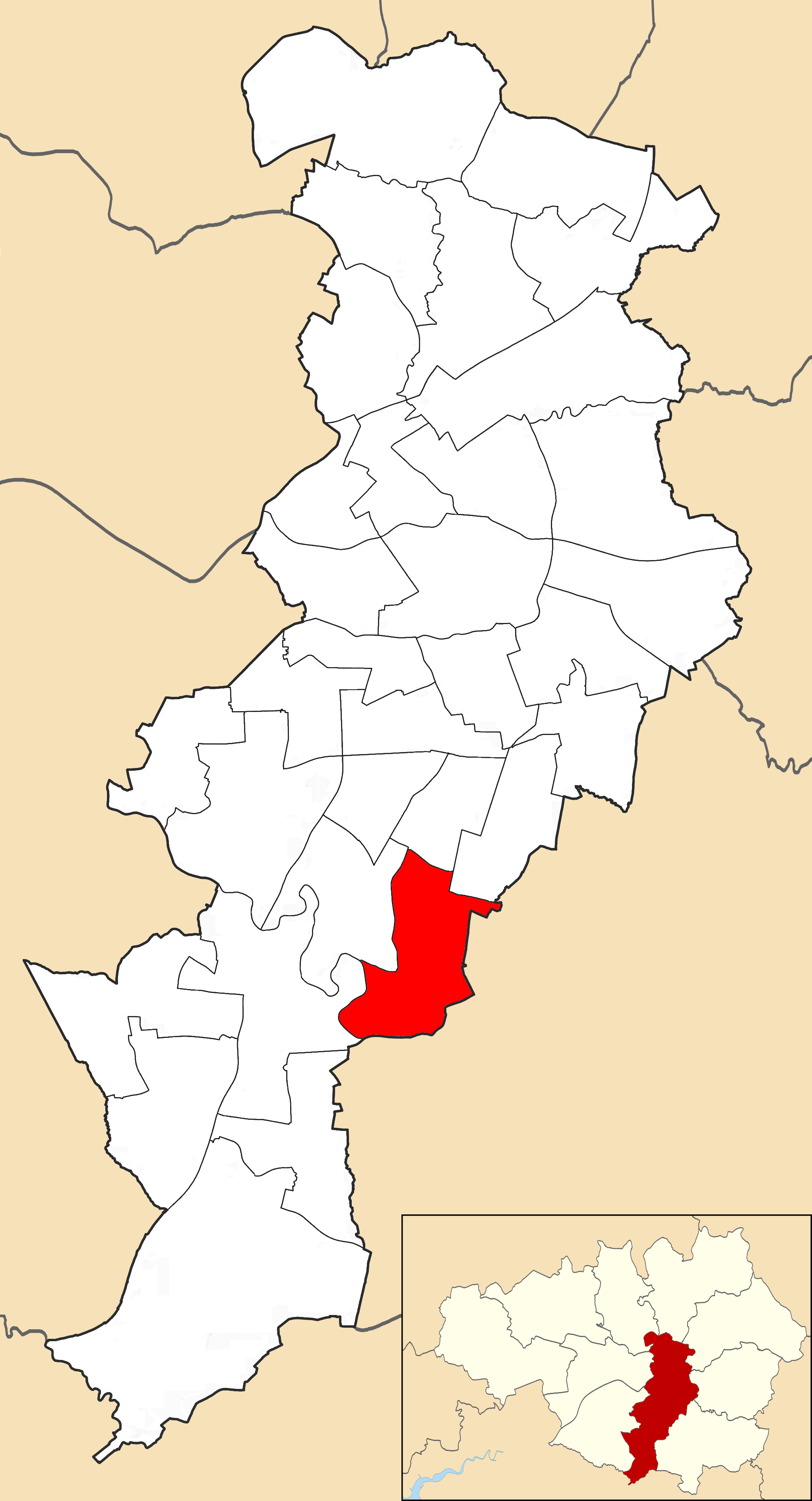
- Didsbury East electoral ward within Manchester City Council

- Coat of arms
- Motto: By wisdom and effort
- Interactive map of Didsbury East (Manchester)
- Coordinates: 53.4127°N 2.2267°W
- Country: United Kingdom
- Constituent country: England
- Region: North West England
- County: Greater Manchester
- Metropolitan borough: Manchester
- Created: 2004
- Named after: Didsbury

Government UK Parliament constituency: Manchester Withington
  - Type: Unicameral
  - Body: Manchester City Council
  - Leader of the council: Bev Craig (Labour)
  - Councillor: Andrew Simcock (Labour Co-op)
  - Councillor: Leslie Bell (Labour)
  - Councillor: Linda Foley (Labour Co-op)

Population
  - Total: 14,333
- Area and population statistics from the 2011 Census

Didsbury East is an area and electoral ward of Manchester, England. It is represented in Westminster by Jeff Smith MP for Manchester Withington. The 2011 Census recorded a population of 14,333.

== Councillors ==
Three councillors serve the ward: Linda Foley (Lab Co-op), Leslie Bell (Lab), and Andrew Simcock (Lab Co-op).

Election	Councillor	Councillor	Councillor
2018	James Wilson (Lab Co-op)	Kelly Simcock (Lab)	Andrew Simcock (Lab)
2019	James Wilson (Labour Co-op)	Kelly Simcock (Lab)	Andrew Simcock (Labour Co-op)
2021	James Wilson (Labour Co-op)	Linda Foley (Labour Co-op)	Andrew Simcock (Labour Co-op)
2022	James Wilson (Labour Co-op)	Linda Foley (Labour Co-op)	Andrew Simcock (Labour Co-op)
2023	James Wilson (Labour Co-op)	Linda Foley (Labour Co-op)	Andrew Simcock (Labour Co-op)
Mar; 2024	Vacant	Linda Foley (Labour Co-op)	Andrew Simcock (Labour Co-op)
May 2024	Leslie Bell (Lab)	Linda Foley (Labour Co-op)	Andrew Simcock (Labour Co-op)
2026	Leslie Bell (Lab)	Linda Foley (Labour Co-op)	Andrew Simcock (Labour Co-op)

indicates seat up for re-election.

== Elections in 2020s ==
* indicates incumbent councillor seeking re-election.

=== May 2026 ===
2026
Party	Candidate	Votes	%	±%
Labour Co-op	Andrew Simcock*	2,104	37.2	▼17.4
Liberal Democrats	Bryn Coombe	1,474	26.1	▼8.2
Green	Laurence Blackwell-Jones	1,443	25.5	▲18.8
Reform	Nigel Greenhalgh	476	8.4	New
Conservative	Parveen Khan	156	2.8	▼1.2
Majority		630	11.1	▼9.2
Turnout		5,653	49.6	▲5.0
Labour Co-op hold		Swing		

=== May 2024 ===
2024
Party	Candidate	Votes	%	±%
Labour	Linda Foley*	2,636	53.4	2.4 ▲
Labour	Leslie Bell	2,611	52.9	1.9 ▲
Liberal Democrats	Bryn Coombe	1,176	23.8	11.9 ▼
Green	Charlotte Mary Lanigan	784	15.9	7.3 ▲
Liberal Democrats	Belal Sabbagh	780	15.8	19.9 ▼
Green	Ben Dundas	622	12.6	4.0 ▲
Conservative	Stephen James McHugh	279	5.7	1.0 ▲
Conservative	Anjenarra Huque	215	4.4	0.4 ▼
Rejected ballots		36		
Turnout		4,933	43.57	
Registered electors		11,322		
Labour hold				
Labour hold				

=== May 2023 ===
2023
Party	Candidate	Votes	%	±%
Labour Co-op	James Wilson*	2,450	52.1	▲10.2
Liberal Democrats	Bryn Coombe	1,560	33.2	▼7.4
Green	Anne Guy	484	10.3	▼0.3
Conservative	Anjenarra Huque	160	3.4	▼2.8
Independent	Paula Matsikidze	48	1	▲1
Majority		890	18.9	▲17.6
Rejected ballots		21		
Turnout		4,702	42.36	▲0.65
Registered electors		11,149		
Labour Co-op hold		Swing		

=== May 2022 ===
2022
Party	Candidate	Votes	%	±%
Labour Co-op	Andrew Simcock*	2,714	54.6	2.7 ▲
Liberal Democrats	John Cameron	1,704	34.3	0.9 ▼
Green	Paula Watson	331	6.7	4.0 ▼
Conservative	Anjenarra Huque	196	4.0	3.5 ▼
Majority		1,010	20.3	
Rejected ballots		22		
Turnout		4,945	44.6	1.0 ▲
Registered electors		11,134		
Labour Co-op hold		Swing	1.8 ▲	

=== May 2021 ===
2021
Party	Candidate	Votes	%	±%
Labour	Linda Foley	2,972	51.0	1.2 ▼
Liberal Democrats	John Cameron	2,082	35.7	1.5 ▼
Green	Liberty Franley	503	8.6	4.8 ▲
Conservative	Anjenarra Huque	276	4.7	2.1 ▼
Majority		890	15.3	
Rejected ballots		32	0.5	
Turnout		5,865	52.0	8.4 ▲
Registered electors		11,283		
Labour hold		Swing	0.2 ▲	

== Elections in 2010s ==
=== May 2019 ===
2019
Party	Candidate	Votes	%	±%
Labour	James Wilson*	1,948	41.9	▼4.3
Liberal Democrats	John Cameron	1,889	40.6	▲5.8
Green	Wendy Lynas	491	10.6	▼0.1
Conservative	James Flanagan	286	6.2	▼1.3
Majority		59	1.27	▼9.7
Rejected ballots		34	0.73	
Turnout		4,648	41.71	▼2.9
Registered electors		11,144		
Labour hold		Swing	▼5.05	

=== May 2018 ===
2018
Party	Candidate	Votes	%	±%
Labour	Andrew Simcock*	2,549	51.9	
Labour	Kelly Simcock*	2,440	49.7	
Labour	James Wilson*	2,268	46.2	
Liberal Democrats	Bryn Coombe	1,729	35.2	
Liberal Democrats	Dominic Hardwick	1,728	35.2	
Liberal Democrats	John Cameron	1,710	34.8	
Green	Wendy Lynas	524	10.7	
Conservative	James Flanagan	368	7.5	
Conservative	Ian Mason	300	6.1	
Conservative	Phelim Rowe	274	5.6	
Majority				
Turnout		4,909	43.6	
Labour win (new boundaries)				
Labour win (new boundaries)				
Labour win (new boundaries)				

Party	Candidates	Seats Won	Votes	Vote %
Labour	3	3	7,257	52.25
Liberal Democrats	3	0	5,167	37.20
Conservative	3	0	942	6.78
Green	1	0	524	3.77

=== May 2016 ===
2016
Party	Candidate	Votes	%	±%
Labour	Kelly Suzanne Simcock	2,484	53.74	
Liberal Democrats	Dominic Hardwick	1,281	27.72	
Green	Wendy Ann Lynas	316	6.84	
Conservative	Robert George Manning	305	6.60	
UKIP	Mark Davies	236	5.11	
Majority		1,203	26.03	
Turnout		4,622	44.00	
Labour hold		Swing		

=== May 2015 ===
2015
Party	Candidate	Votes	%	±%
Labour	Andrew George Simcock	3,572	45.4	−5.9
Liberal Democrats	Dominic Hardwick	2,205	28.0	−5.4
Conservative	Robert George Manning	1,008	12.8	+4.0
Green	Rosie Dammers	731	9.3	+3.0
UKIP	Mark Davies	356	4.5	N/A
Majority		1,367	17.4	
Turnout		7,872	70.7	+25.8
Labour hold		Swing		

=== May 2014 ===
2014
Party	Candidate	Votes	%	±%
Labour Co-op	James Wilson	1,968	43.18	+6.78
Liberal Democrats	Dominic Hardwick	1,375	30.17	−16.53
Green	Lucy Jane Bannister	405	8.89	+3.09
Conservative	Rob Manning	403	8.84	−2.36
UKIP	Mark Falcon Davies	369	8.10	N/A
TUSC	Sam Gleadon	38	0.83	N/A
Majority		593	13.0	
Turnout		4,558	41.6	
Labour Co-op gain from Liberal Democrats		Swing		

=== May 2012 ===
2012
Party	Candidate	Votes	%	±%
Labour	Bridie Adams	2,039	50.5	+23.5
Liberal Democrats	David Sandiford*	1,398	34.6	−17.9
Green	Amy Webber	318	7.9	+0.0
Conservative	Jamie Williams	280	6.9	−5.7
Majority		641	16	
Turnout		4,035	37.6	
Labour gain from Liberal Democrats		Swing		

=== May 2011 ===
2011
Party	Candidate	Votes	%	±%
Labour	Andrew Simcock	2,465	51.5	+19.3
Liberal Democrats	Helen Fisher*	1,598	33.4	−12.5
Conservative	Christopher Green	423	8.8	−4.2
Green	Kathleen Matthews	303	6.3	−2.6
Majority		867	18.1	
Turnout		4,789	44.9	
Labour gain from Liberal Democrats		Swing		

=== May 2010 ===
2010
Party	Candidate	Votes	%	±%
Liberal Democrats	Andrew Taylor	3,364	46.7	−5.8
Labour	Andrew Simcock	2,622	36.4	+9.4
Conservative	Asad Khan	806	11.2	−1.4
Green	Gerry Gee	419	5.8	−2.1
Majority		742	10.3	−15.2
Turnout		7,211	68.8	+30.8
Liberal Democrats hold		Swing	-7.6	

== Elections in 2000s ==
2008
Party	Candidate	Votes	%	±%
Liberal Democrats	David Sandiford*	2,050	52.5	+6.6
Labour	Andrew Simcock	1,053	27.0	−5.2
Conservative	Louise Quigley	492	12.6	−0.4
Green	Gerry Gee	310	7.9	−1.0
Majority		997	25.5	+11.8
Turnout		3,905	38.0	−1.1
Liberal Democrats hold		Swing	+5.9	

2007
Party	Candidate	Votes	%	±%
Liberal Democrats	Helen Fisher*	1,856	45.9	+0.6
Labour	Geoff Bridson	1,301	32.2	−2.1
Conservative	David Fairclough	526	13.0	+4.0
Green	Gerry Gee	359	8.9	−2.6
Majority		555	13.7	+2.7
Turnout		4,042	39.1	0
Liberal Democrats hold		Swing	+1.3	

2006
Party	Candidate	Votes	%	±%
Liberal Democrats	Anthony Thomas Parkinson*	1,809	45.3	−2.4
Labour	Geoffrey Bridson	1,369	34.3	+2.9
Green	Richard Edgar Gee	459	11.5	+3.4
Conservative	Peter Malcolm Schofield	359	9.0	−3.7
Majority		440	11.0	−5.3
Turnout		3,996	39.1	−9.3
Liberal Democrats hold		Swing	-2.6	

2004
Party	Candidate	Votes	%	±%
Liberal Democrats	David Sandiford*	2,491	47.7	N/A
Liberal Democrats	Helen Fisher*	2,228		
Liberal Democrats	Anthony Parkinson*	2,196		
Labour	Geoffrey Bridson	1,639	31.4	N/A
Labour	Andrew Simcock	1,325		
Labour	Michael Emmerich	1,308		
Conservative	Peter Schofield	666	12.7	N/A
Conservative	Daniel Valentine	547		
Conservative	Nicholas Garside	522		
Green	Jennifer Bailey	423	8.1	N/A
Green	Frances Simpson	335		
Green	Darren Milton	313		
Majority		557	16.3	N/A
Turnout		5,219	48.4	N/A
Liberal Democrats win (new seat)				
Liberal Democrats win (new seat)				
Liberal Democrats win (new seat)				
