= Ancoats and Clayton =

Coordinates: 53.4854°N 2.2013°W

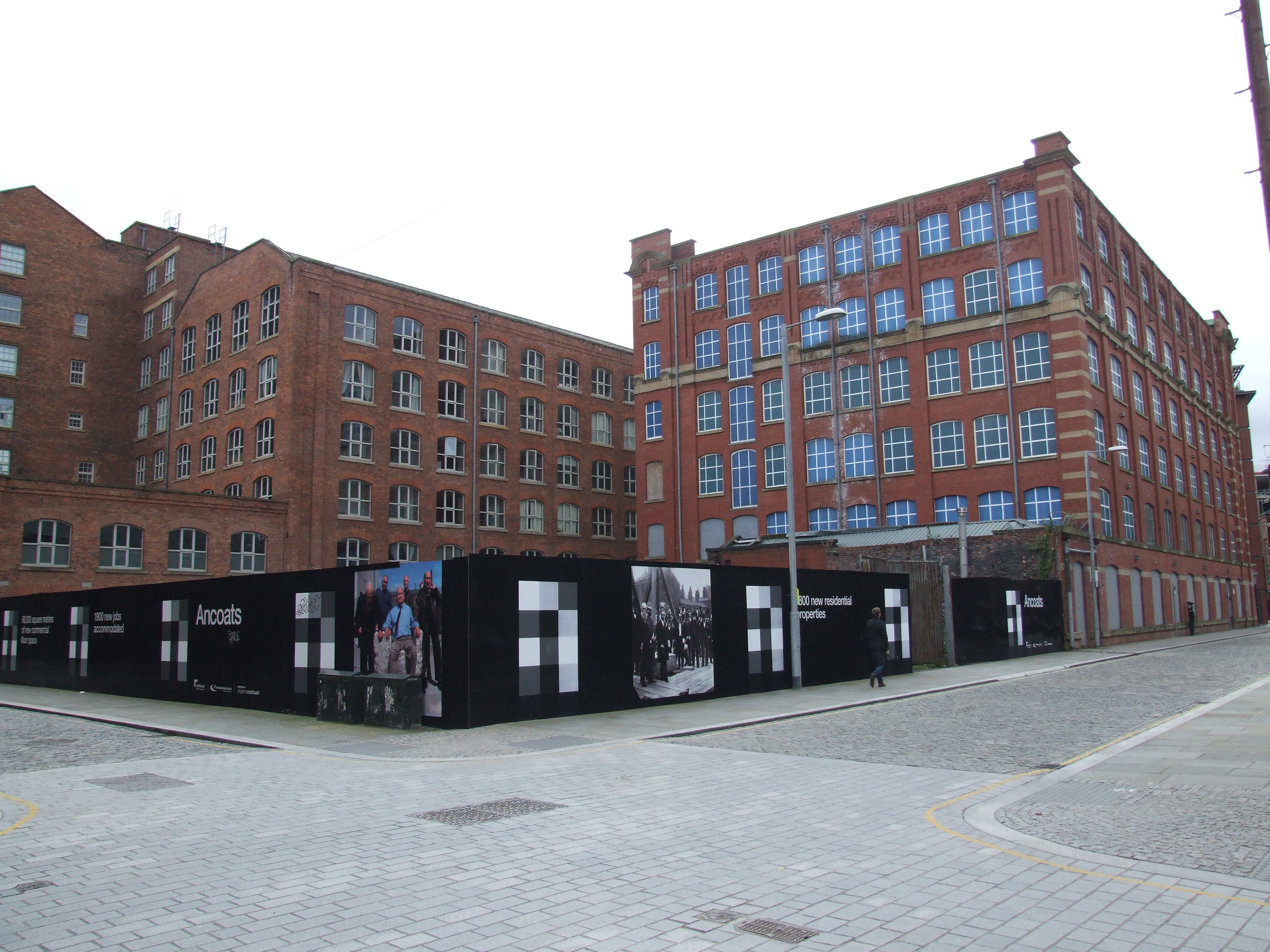
- Paragon Mill on the corner of Murray Street and Jersey Street, Ancoats

- Location within Greater Manchester
- Population: 16,141 (2011)
- OS grid reference: SJ8673998761
- Metropolitan borough: City of Manchester
- Metropolitan county: Greater Manchester
- Region: North West
- Country: England
- Sovereign state: United Kingdom
- Post town: MANCHESTER
- Postcode district: M4 M11
- Dialling code: 0161
- Police: Greater Manchester
- Fire: Greater Manchester
- Ambulance: North West
- UK Parliament: Manchester Central
- Councillors: Donna Ludford (Labour); Mick Loughman (Labour); Ollie Manco (Labour)

Ancoats and Clayton was an electoral district or ward in the north of the City of Manchester in North West England. The population of this ward at the 2011 census was 16,141. It includes the Ancoats and Clayton districts and part of the Northern Quarter. Under boundary changes by the Local Government Boundary Commission for England (LGBCE) the ward was abolished and replaced with the new electoral wards Ancoats and Beswick, Clayton and Openshaw, and Piccadilly from May 2018.

== Governance ==
Voters from the ward elected three councillors to Manchester City Council.

Councillors

Election	Councillor	Councillor	Councillor
2004	Jim Battle (Lab)	Mick Loughman (Lab)	Mike Carmody (Lab)
2006	Jim Battle (Lab)	Mick Loughman (Lab)	Mike Carmody (Lab)
2007	Jim Battle (Lab)	Mick Loughman (Lab)	Mike Carmody (Lab)
2008	Jim Battle (Lab)	Mick Loughman (Lab)	Mike Carmody (Lab)
2010	Jim Battle (Lab)	Mick Loughman (Lab)	Mike Carmody (Lab)
2011	Jim Battle (Lab)	Mick Loughman (Lab)	Mike Carmody (Lab)
2012	Jim Battle (Lab)	Mick Loughman (Lab)	Mike Carmody (Lab)
By-election; 10 October 2013	Donna Ludford (Lab)	Mick Loughman (Lab)	Mike Carmody (Lab)
By-election; 5 December 2013	Donna Ludford (Lab)	Mick Loughman (Lab)	Ollie Manco (Lab)
2014	Donna Ludford (Lab)	Mick Loughman (Lab)	Ollie Manco (Lab)
2015	Donna Ludford (Lab)	Mick Loughman (Lab)	Ollie Manco (Lab)
2016	Donna Ludford (Lab)	Mick Loughman (Lab)	Ollie Manco (Lab)
2018	Ward abolished	Ward abolished	Ward abolished

indicates seat up for re-election. indicates seat won in by-election. indicates ward abolished and replaced with Ancoats and Beswick, Clayton and Openshaw and Piccadilly.
