= 2012 Manchester City Council election =

2012 UK local government election

- 3 May 2012

32 of 96 seats to Manchester City Council 49 seats needed for a majority
	First party	Second party
Leader	Richard Leese	Marc Ramsbottom
Party	Labour	Liberal Democrats
Leader's seat	Crumpsall	City Centre (defeated)
Last election	33 seats, 62.4%	0 seats, 17.3%
Seats before	75	21
Seats won	32	0
Seats after	87	9
Seat change	▲12	▼12
Popular vote	59,632	13,341
Percentage	65.7%	14.7%
Swing	▲3.3%	▼2.6%
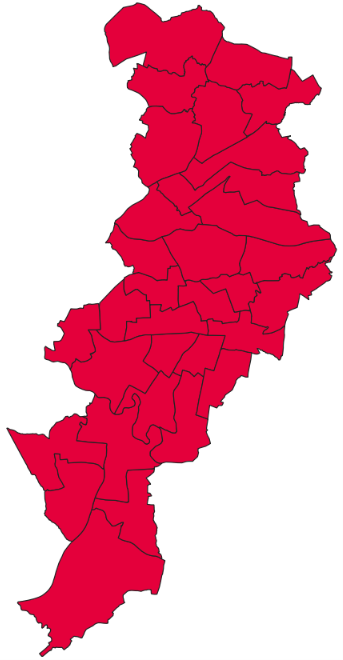
- Map of results of 2012 election
Leader of the Council before election
Richard Leese
Labour
Leader of the Council after election
Richard Leese
Labour

Elections to Manchester City Council took place on 3 May 2012, on the same day as other 2012 United Kingdom local elections and alongside a referendum on whether to replace the council's leader with a directly elected mayor.

One third of the council was up for election, with those councillors elected in the 2008 Manchester City Council election having defended their seats on this occasion with vote share changes compared on that basis.

== Election result ==
Party	Votes		Seats			Full Council	
Labour Party	59,632 (65.7%)	▲3.3	32 (100.0%)	32 / 32	▲12	87 (90.6%)	87 / 96
Liberal Democrats	13,341 (14.7%)	▼2.6	0 (0.0%)	0 / 32	▼12	9 (9.4%)	9 / 96
Green Party	7,801 (8.6%)	▲1.0	0 (0.0%)	0 / 32	Steady	0 (0.0%)	0 / 96
Conservative Party	6,084 (6.7%)	▼2.3	0 (0.0%)	0 / 32	Steady	0 (0.0%)	0 / 96
UKIP	2,034 (2.2%)	▲1.1	0 (0.0%)	0 / 32	Steady	0 (0.0%)	0 / 96
TUSC	898 (1.0%)	▲0.7	0 (0.0%)	0 / 32	Steady	0 (0.0%)	0 / 96
BNP	472 (0.5%)	▼0.8	0 (0.0%)	0 / 32	Steady	0 (0.0%)	0 / 96
Socialist Equality	259 (0.3%)	N/A	0 (0.0%)	0 / 32	N/A	0 (0.0%)	0 / 96
Respect	153 (0.5%)	▼0.4	0 (0.0%)	0 / 32	Steady	0 (0.0%)	0 / 96
Communist League	52 (0.1%)	N/A	0 (0.0%)	0 / 32	N/A	0 (0.0%)	0 / 96

↓
87	9

== Ward results ==
=== Ancoats and Clayton ===
Ancoats and Clayton
Party	Candidate	Votes	%	±%
Labour	Mike Carmody*	1,862	74.3	+14.6
Green	Peter Birkinshaw	215	8.6	−0.9
Conservative	Mark Ford	173	6.9	−7.1
Liberal Democrats	Claude-Diele Nsumbu	100	4.0	−12.9
TUSC	Alex Davidson	82	3.3	N/A
Pirate	Tim Dobson	75	3.0	N/A
Majority		1,674	66.8	+23.9
Turnout		2507	23.47	+0.07
Labour hold		Swing		

=== Ardwick ===
Ardwick
Party	Candidate	Votes	%	±%
Labour	Thomas O'Callaghan*	1,729	80.4	+18.3
Green	Patrick Sudlow	146	6.8	−.2
Conservative	Rob Manning	111	5.2	−6.4
Liberal Democrats	Susan Alman	101	4.7	−13.5
TUSC	Shari Holden	64	3.0	N/A
Majority		1,683	78.2	+34.2
Turnout		2,151	18.1	
Labour hold		Swing		

=== Baguley ===
Baguley
Party	Candidate	Votes	%	±%
Labour	Luke Raikes	1,485	63.4	+16.7
UKIP	Christopher Cassidy	281	12.0	N/A
Conservative	Ralph Ellerton	259	11.1	−12.4
TUSC	Lynn Worthington	115	4.9	N/A
Liberal Democrats	Yvonne Donaghey	102	4.4	−5.7
Green	Jostine Loubster	101	4.3	−3.1
Majority		1,204	51.4	
Turnout		2,343	21.64	
Labour hold		Swing		

=== Bradford ===
Bradford
Party	Candidate	Votes	%	±%
Labour	Neil Swannick*	1,903	77.7	+10.6
Conservative	Sarah Bennett	159	6.5	−3.7
Green	Lorna Bowen	141	5.8	−3.8
Pirate	Loz Kaye	127	5.2	N/A
Liberal Democrats	Charles Turner	106	4.3	−8.8
Communist League	Peter Clifford	14	0.6	N/A
Majority		1,744	71.2	
Turnout		2,450	21.21	
Labour hold		Swing		

=== Brooklands ===
Brooklands
Party	Candidate	Votes	%	±%
Labour	Glynn Evans*	1,629	53.7	+9.5
Conservative	Stephen Woods	532	17.6	−20.8
UKIP	Nathan Gilbert	279	9.2	N/A
Green	Eithne Quinn	140	4.6	−0.5
Liberal Democrats	Peter Maxson	111	3.7	−8.9
Majority		1,097	40.8	
Turnout		2,691	28.6	
Labour hold		Swing		

=== Burnage ===
Burnage
Party	Candidate	Votes	%	±%
Labour	Bev Craig*	2,416	72.0	+48.3
Liberal Democrats	Grace Baynham	513	15.3	−49.5
Green	Sam Darby	262	7.8	+3.4
Conservative	Peter Schofield	163	4.9	−2.2
Majority		1,903	56.7	
Turnout		3,354	31.2	
Labour hold		Swing		

=== Charlestown ===
Charlestown
Party	Candidate	Votes	%	±%
Labour	Mark Hackett*	1,955	75.3	+29.3
Conservative	Tom Archer	292	11.2	−3.5
Green	Chris Hyland	252	9.7	+3.3
Liberal Democrats	Joanne Taylor	98	3.8	−2.4
Majority		1,663	64	
Turnout		2,597	25.36	
Labour hold		Swing		

=== Cheetham ===
Cheetham
Party	Candidate	Votes	%	±%
Labour	Shaukat Ali	2,854	62.3	+12.4
Independent	Shazia Butt	1,121	24.5	N/A
Green	Luke Smith	261	5.7	+1.6
Conservative	Sham Akhtar	213	4.7	−14.6
Liberal Democrats	Rodney Isherwood	130	2.8	−9.5
Majority		1,733	38	
Turnout		4,579	30.64	
Labour hold		Swing		

=== Chorlton ===
Chorlton
Party	Candidate	Votes	%	±%
Labour	Sheila Newman*	2,433	56.8	+11.6
Liberal Democrats	Matt Gallagher	797	18.6	−21.1
Green	Brian Candeland	503	11.8	+2.3
TUSC	Mark Krantz	368	8.6	N/A
Conservative	Jonathan Beardmore	180	4.2	−1.3
Majority		1,636	38	
Turnout		4,281	39.19	
Labour hold		Swing		

=== Chorlton Park ===
Chorlton Park
Party	Candidate	Votes	%	±%
Labour	Joanna Midgley	2,083	56.2	+32.2
Liberal Democrats	Bernie Ryan*	1,115	30.1	−23.3
Green	Leon Patsalides	354	9.6	−1.7
Conservative	Leo Schindler	156	4.2	−7.1
Majority		968	26	
Turnout		3,708	32.8	
Labour gain from Liberal Democrats		Swing		

=== City Centre ===
City Centre
Party	Candidate	Votes	%	±%
Labour	Joan Davies	704	38.4	+7.9
Liberal Democrats	Marc Ramsbottom*	465	25.4	−10.7
Conservative	Michael Liffen	234	12.8	−11.8
Green	Nick Wilkinson	190	10.4	+1.6
Independent	Ken Dobson	159	8.7	N/A
Pirate	Maria Aretoulaki	57	3.1	N/A
UKIP	Adrienne Bennett	25	1.4	N/A
Majority		239	13	
Turnout		1,833	13.65	
Labour gain from Liberal Democrats		Swing		

=== Crumpsall ===
Crumpsall
Party	Candidate	Votes	%	±%
Labour	Richard Leese*	2,499	78.6	+22.1
Conservative	Samuel Jacob	225	7.1	−11.9
UKIP	Robert Willescroft	221	7.0	+0.4
Green	Kim Alwyn	157	4.9	−1.7
Liberal Democrats	Adam Hewitt	77	2.4	−8.9
Majority		2,274	72	
Turnout		3,179	29.2	
Labour hold		Swing		

=== Didsbury East ===
Didsbury East
Party	Candidate	Votes	%	±%
Labour	Bridie Adams	2,039	50.5	+23.5
Liberal Democrats	David Sandiford*	1,398	34.6	−17.9
Green	Amy Webber	318	7.9	+0.0
Conservative	Jamie Williams	280	6.9	−5.7
Majority		641	16	
Turnout		4,035	37.6	
Labour gain from Liberal Democrats		Swing		

=== Didsbury West ===
Didsbury West
Party	Candidate	Votes	%	±%
Labour	Carl Ollerhead	1,393	47.5	+24.7
Liberal Democrats	Graham Shaw*	909	31.0	−16.2
Green	Gareth Price-Thomas	317	10.8	+0.5
Conservative	Dola Miah	246	8.4	−8.2
Democracy First	Robert Gutfreund-Walmsley	69	2.4	N/A
Majority		484	16	
Turnout		2,934	27.9	
Labour gain from Liberal Democrats		Swing		

=== Fallowfield ===
Fallowfield
Party	Candidate	Votes	%	±%
Labour	David Royle*	1,733	77.9	+26.5
Green	Rosie Dammers	198	8.9	−0.1
Conservative	Charles Bailey	144	6.5	−5.0
Liberal Democrats	Ronan Stafford	80	3.6	−24.5
TUSC	Katen Verma	70	3.2	N/A
Majority		1,535	69	
Turnout		2,225	19.4	
Labour hold		Swing		

=== Gorton North ===
Gorton North
Party	Candidate	Votes	%	±%
Labour	Afia Kamal	1,478	53.0	+14.7
Liberal Democrats	Jackie Pearcey*	987	35.4	−13.3
Green	Karl Wardlaw	187	6.7	+1.7
Conservative	Abiodun Opesan	101	3.6	−4.4
Communist League	Andres Mendoza	38	1.4	N/A
Majority		491	18	
Turnout		2,791	24.9	
Labour gain from Liberal Democrats		Swing		

=== Gorton South ===
Gorton South
Party	Candidate	Votes	%	±%
Labour	Bernard Stone	2,091	53.8	+19.3
Liberal Democrats	Charles Glover*	1,198	30.8	−12.0
UKIP	Robert Catterall	202	5.2	N/A
Green	Ryan Bestford	161	4.2	−1.4
Respect	Marie-Angelique Bueler	153	3.9	N/A
Conservative	Tmo Opesan	79	2.0	−5.4
Majority		893	23	
Turnout		3,884	30.7	
Labour gain from Liberal Democrats		Swing		

=== Harpurhey ===
Harpurhey
Party	Candidate	Votes	%	±%
Labour	Pat Karney*	1,890	76.2	+18.9
Conservative	William Clapham	250	10.1	−9.3
Green	Simon Gibbins	227	9.2	−1.8
Liberal Democrats	Mellissa Houlding	112	4.5	−7.8
Majority		1,640	66	
Turnout		2,479	20.24	
Labour hold		Swing		

=== Higher Blackley ===
Higher Blackley
Party	Candidate	Votes	%	±%
Labour	Shelley Lanchbury	1,753	67.5	+23.7
Conservative	Malcolm Evans	226	8.7	−6.7
BNP	Derek Adams	221	8.5	−18.8
UKIP	Allison Newsham	198	7.6	N/A
Liberal Democrats	Maria Turner	100	3.8	−4.4
Green	Nick Good	98	3.8	−1.6
Majority		1,527	59	
Turnout		2,596	24.6	
Labour hold		Swing		

=== Hulme ===
Hulme
Party	Candidate	Votes	%	±%
Labour	Amina Lone*	1,301	60.9	+18.7
Green	Deyika Nzeribe	595	27.8	−12.2
Conservative	Jack Kelly	117	5.5	−34.5
Liberal Democrats	Dom Hardwick	94	4.4	−3.9
Independent	James Guise	30	1.4	N/A
Majority		706	33	
Turnout		2,137	16.98	
Labour hold		Swing		

=== Levenshulme ===
Levenshulme
Party	Candidate	Votes	%	±%
Labour	Nasrin Ali	1,722	50.3	+24.3
Liberal Democrats	John Commons	955	27.9	−27.8
Green	David Mottram	674	19.7	+7.8
Conservative	Ryan El-Idrissi	73	2.1	−9.8
Majority		767	22	
Turnout		3,424	30.6	
Labour gain from Liberal Democrats		Swing		

=== Longsight ===
Longsight
Party	Candidate	Votes	%	±%
Labour	Luthfur Rahman*	2,754	76.0	+14.4
Conservative	Mohammed Afzal	436	12.0	+7.3
Green	Wendy Lynas	301	8.3	+1.0
Liberal Democrats	Mohammad Panwar	134	3.7	−22.7
Majority		2,318	64	
Turnout		3,625	31.95	
Labour hold		Swing		

=== Miles Platting and Newton Heath ===
Miles Platting and Newton Heath
Party	Candidate	Votes	%	±%
Labour	Carmine Grimshaw	1,807	65.0	+25.5
Liberal Democrats	Damien O'Connor*	830	29.8	−15.8
Green	Jacob Lay	145	5.2	+2.6
Majority		977	35	
Turnout		2,782	25.76	
Labour gain from Liberal Democrats		Swing		

=== Moss Side ===
Moss Side
Party	Candidate	Votes	%	±%
Labour	William Alistair Cox*	2,545	84.3	+16.3
Green	Richard Lane	153	5.1	−3.5
TUSC	Colette Williams	121	4.0	N/A
Conservative	Will Stobart	120	4.0	−3.1
Liberal Democrats	Richard Gadsden	79	2.6	−7.9
Majority		2,392	79	
Turnout		3,018	24.40	
Labour hold		Swing		

=== Moston ===
Moston
Party	Candidate	Votes	%	±%
Labour	Paul Murphy*	1,801	53.8	+4.3
Independent	Bob Hill	930	27.8	N/A
Conservative	H.C.H. Hill	257	7.7	−22.2
BNP	Gareth Black	251	7.5	N/A
Green	Barnaby Wolfram	111	3.3	−4.6
Majority		871	26	
Turnout		3,350	30.06	
Labour hold		Swing		

=== Northenden ===
Northenden
Party	Candidate	Votes	%	±%
Labour	Fran Shone	1,983	64.3	+20.7
Liberal Democrats	Andrew Hardwick	405	13.1	−30.7
Conservative	Stephen Heath	242	8.0	−0.2
UKIP	Eugene Cassidy	237	7.7	N/A
Green	Chris Gibbins	215	7.0	+2.5
Majority		1,578	51	
Turnout		3,082	27.6	
Labour gain from Liberal Democrats		Swing		

=== Old Moat ===
Old Moat
Party	Candidate	Votes	%	±%
Labour	Andrew Fender*	1,822	74.1	+23.6
Green	Amy Howard	278	11.3	+3.6
Liberal Democrats	Nicholas Prescott	221	9.0	−25.4
Conservative	Nicholas Savage	139	5.7	−1.7
Majority		1,544	63	
Turnout		2,460	22	
Labour hold		Swing		

=== Rusholme ===
Rusholme
Party	Candidate	Votes	%	±%
Labour	Ahmed Ali	2,100	74.8	+47.6
Liberal Democrats	Paul Shannon*	352	12.5	−30.2
Green	Dane Lam	220	7.8	+1.6
Conservative	James Johnson	96	3.4	−8.0
Independent	Pip Moss	41	1.5	N/A
Majority		1,748	62	
Turnout		2,809	26	
Labour gain from Liberal Democrats		Swing		

=== Sharston ===
Sharston
Party	Candidate	Votes	%	±%
Labour	Tommy Judge*	1,666	69.5	+22.3
UKIP	Dean Roberts	244	10.2	N/A
Conservative	Jim McCullough	218	9.1	−23.6
Liberal Democrats	Dave Page	100	4.2	−7.4
Green	Alison Hunt	91	3.8	−4.6
TUSC	Trevor Prior	78	3.3	N/A
Majority		1,422	59	
Turnout		2397	20.44	
Labour hold		Swing		

=== Whalley Range ===
Whalley Range
Party	Candidate	Votes	%	±%
Labour	Angeliki Stogia	2,517	65.7	+36.0
Liberal Democrats	John Grant*	759	19.8	−19.5
Green	Mary Candeland	426	11.1	+2.2
Conservative	Amjad Nasir	127	3.3	−18.8
Majority		1,758	46	
Turnout		3,829	33.4	
Labour gain from Liberal Democrats		Swing		

=== Withington ===
Withington
Party	Candidate	Votes	%	±%
Labour	Daniel Gillard	1,107	46.6	+23.5
Liberal Democrats	Brendon Jones*	862	36.3	−21.4
Green	Laura Bannister	251	10.6	−0.4
Conservative	Lorna McHugh	88	3.7	−5.4
UKIP	James Howson	68	2.9	N/A
Majority		245	10	
Turnout		2,376	21	
Labour gain from Liberal Democrats		Swing		

=== Woodhouse Park ===
Woodhouse Park
Party	Candidate	Votes	%	±%
Labour	Brian O'Neil*	1,449	71.1	+10.5
UKIP	Pamela Shotton	279	13.7	N/A
Conservative	Stephen McHugh	148	7.3	−16.1
Green	Kathleen Molteno	113	5.6	−2.3
Liberal Democrats	David Kierman	51	2.5	−5.7
Majority		1,170	57	
Turnout		2,040	19.98	
Labour hold		Swing		

== By-elections between 2012 and 2013 ==
=== Ardwick: 15 November 2012 ===
Ardwick: 15 November 2012
Party	Candidate	Votes	%	±%
Labour	Tina Hewitson	1,904	80.47	+0.09
Green	Karl Wardlaw	120	5.07	−1.72
Liberal Democrats	Liaquat Ali	94	3.97	−0.72
Conservative	Jamie Williams	92	3.89	−1.27
UKIP	Allison Newsham	61	2.58	N/A
TUSC	Shari Holden	52	2.20	−0.78
BNP	Steven Carden	43	1.82	N/A
Majority		1,784	75.40	
Turnout		2,395	20	
Labour hold		Swing		

=== Ancoats and Clayton: 10 October 2013 ===
Ancoats and Clayton: 10 October 2013
Party	Candidate	Votes	%	±%
Labour	Donna Ludford	1,239	70.5	−3.8
UKIP	Adrienne Shaw	166	9.4	New
Green	Pete Birkinshaw	89	5.1	−3.5
Conservative	Nicholas Savage	82	4.7	−2.2
Pirate	Loz Kaye	79	4.5	+1.5
BNP	Gareth Black	58	3.3	New
Liberal Democrats	John Bridges	44	2.5	−1.5
Majority		1,073	61.1	
Turnout		1,771	13.6	
Labour hold		Swing		

=== Ancoats and Clayton: 5 December 2013 ===
Ancoats and Clayton: 5 December 2013
Party	Candidate	Votes	%	±%
Labour	Ollie Manco	965	57.5	−16.8
Liberal	Ken Dobson	219	13.1	New
UKIP	Martin Power	138	8.2	New
Green	Pete Birkinshaw	106	6.3	−2.3
Conservative	David Semple	75	4.5	−2.4
Pirate	Loz Kaye	72	4.3	+1.3
BNP	Gareth Black	46	2.7	New
Liberal Democrats	Claude Nsumbu	31	1.8	−2.2
TUSC	Alex Davidson	17	1.0	−2.3
Communist League	Caroline Bellamy	9	0.5	New
Majority		746	44.4	
Turnout		1,686	10.7	
Labour hold		Swing		
