= Richard Leese =

British Labour politician, Leader of Manchester City Council

Sir Richard Leese CBE
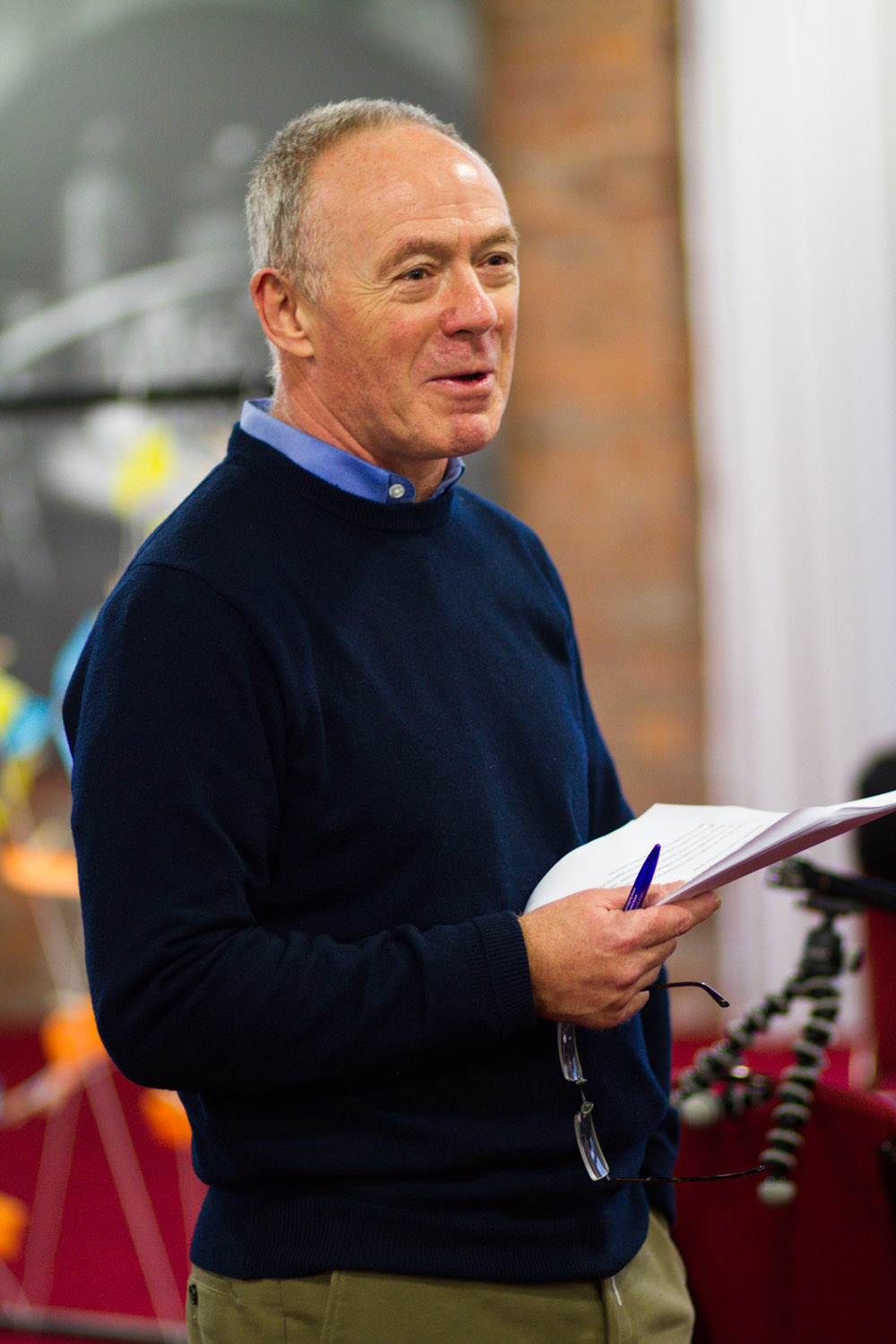
- Leese in 2012

Deputy Mayor of Greater Manchester
- In office 8 May 2017 – 8 December 2021
- Mayor: Andy Burnham
- Preceded by: Office established
- Succeeded by: Paul Dennett

Leader of Manchester City Council
- In office 20 May 1996 – 1 December 2021
- Preceded by: Graham Stringer
- Succeeded by: Bev Craig

Member of Manchester City Council for Crumpsall
- In office 3 May 1984 – 4 January 2022
- Preceded by: Frederick Lever
- Succeeded by: Jawad Amin

Personal details
- Born: Richard Charles Leese; 21 April 1951 (age 75) Mansfield, Nottinghamshire, England
- Party: Labour
- Domestic partner: Joanne Green (2003–present)
- Education: The Brunts School; University of Warwick (BSc)

Sir Richard Charles Leese CBE (born 21 April 1951) is a British politician who served as Leader of Manchester City Council from 1996 to 2021. A member of the Labour Party, he was Deputy Mayor of Greater Manchester from 2017 to 2021.

== Early life and education ==
Richard Charles Leese was born on 21 April 1951 in Mansfield, Nottinghamshire. He was educated at The Brunts School and received an undergraduate degree in Mathematics from the University of Warwick. He attained an Advanced Certificate in Youth and Community Work at Manchester University.

== Career ==
Initially, Leese worked as a teacher of mathematics at Sidney Stringer School in Coventry and as an exchange teacher at Washington Junior High School in Duluth, Minnesota in the United States, before moving to Manchester to take up a post as a youth worker. Leese was employed variously in youth work, community work and education research between 1979–1988.

Leese was elected to the Manchester City Council in 1984 and was its deputy leader from 1990 until 1996, having previously chaired the Education Committee (1986–1990) and Finance Committee (1990–1995). From 1984 until 4 January 2022, he was a Labour councillor in the Crumpsall ward.

He was knighted in the Queen's Birthday Honours 2006 List after overseeing the ten-year regeneration of the city after the IRA bomb of 1996. He was awarded a knighthood for "services to local government".

Leese was one of the main advocates of Congestion Charging in Greater Manchester, as part of a bid to the Government's Transport Innovation Fund (TIF) for a £2.7 billion package of transport funding for Greater Manchester. Congestion charging was ultimately rejected by the local population in a referendum.

On 6 May 2017, Leese was appointed Deputy Mayor for Business and Economy by Mayor of Greater Manchester, and former Health Secretary, Andy Burnham. In October 2021, Leese was announced as the new Chair-designate of the Integrated Care Board (ICB) for Greater Manchester. He has been chair of the North West Regional Leaders Board (4NW).

In September 2021, during an interview with the Manchester Evening News, Leese announced he would be stepping down as leader of Manchester City Council in December 2021 and would not be standing in the 2022 local elections. He stepped down as leader of the council on 1 December 2021 and resigned from the council on 4 January 2022, having spent 38 years as a councillor.

== Personal life ==
Leese was in a relationship with Michal Evans from 1982 to 2000, and has been with Joanne Green since 2003.

On 14 April 2010, the BBC reported that Leese had stood down temporarily from his post as leader of Manchester City Council after having been arrested on suspicion of the common assault of his 16-year-old stepdaughter. He was released after accepting a police caution and admitting striking his stepdaughter across the face.

Political offices
Preceded by Graham Stringer	Leader of Manchester City Council; 1996–2021	Succeeded by Bev Craig
New office	Deputy Mayor of Greater Manchester; 2017-2021	Succeeded by Paul Dennett
