= Bowman (surname) =

Bowman is an English and Scottish surname of occupational origin. It derives from the Middle English words bowe (bow) and -man, originally denoting an archer, hunter, or soldier armed with a bow. The surname is distinct from Bowyer, which historically referred to a maker or seller of bows. 'Bowman' may also be an Americanized form of the German surname Baumann or the Dutch cognate Bouwman - both of different etymology.

Notable people with the surname include:

== A ==
- A. Blaine Bowman (born 1946), American physicist
- Abe Bowman (1893–1979), American baseball player
- Abie Philbin Bowman (born 1969), Irish journalist and comedian
- Abraham Bowman (1749–1837), American politician
- Adam Bowman (1880–1937), Scottish footballer
- Adarius Bowman (born 1985), American gridiron football player
- Aisling Byrne-Bowman (born 1967), Irish sailor
- Akemi Dawn Bowman, Asian-American author
- Alan Bowman (classicist) (born 1944), British classicist and academic
- Alan Bowman (American football) (born 2000), American football player
- Alex Bowman (born 1993), American racing driver
- Alexander Bowman (Australian politician) (1838–1892), Australian politician
- Alexander Bowman (Irish politician) (1854–1924), Irish politician and trade unioinist
- Alexander Hamilton Bowman (1803–1865), United States Army officer
- Alfred Connor Bowman (1904–1982), American lawyer and military officer
- Alfredo Bowman (1933–2016), Honduran herbalist
- Alice Bowman (born 1960), American engineering manager
- Alonzo Bowman (1848–1885), US Army Medal of Honor recipient
- Alpheus Michael Bowman (1847–1913), American politician
- Alvin Bowman (born 1953), American academic administrator
- Amber Bowman (born 1985), Canadian firefighter and ice hockey player
- Andrea Bowman, Saint Vincent and the Grenadines politician, diplomat
- Andrew Bowman (born 1984), Scottish badminton player
- Andy Bowman (1934–2009), Scottish footballer
- Aundria Bowman (1974–1989), American murder victim

== B ==
- Barbara A. Bowman (born 1954), American nutritionist
- Barbara H. Bowman (1930–1996), American geneticist
- Barbara T. Bowman (1928–2024), American childhood education expert
- Barry Bowman (born 1964), American football player
- Baxter Bowman (1814–1853), Canadian politician
- Ben Bowman (director), American film director and screenwriter
- Ben Bowman (politician) (born 1992), American politician
- Beniah Bowman (1886–1941), Canadian politician
- Benjamin Bowman (born 1979), American-Canadian violinist
- Bertie Bowman (1931–2023), American congressional staffer
- Bill Bowman (American football) (1931–2008), American football player
- Bill Bowman (American politician) (1946–2020), American politician
- Bill Bowman (baseball) (1867–1944), American baseball player
- Bill Bowman (racing driver) (1935–2008), American racecar driver
- Bill Bowman (Scottish politician) (born 1950), Scottish businessperson and politician
- Billy Bowman Jr. (born 2003), American football player
- Bob Bowman (coach) (born 1965), American swimming coach
- Bob Bowman (outfielder) (1930-2017), American baseball player
- Bob Bowman (pitcher) (1910–1972), American baseball player
- Bonnie Bowman, Canadian writer
- Brady Bowman (born 1970), American philosopher
- Braeden Bowman (born 2003), Canadian ice hockey player
- Braedon Bowman (born 1994), American football player
- Brandon Bowman (born 1984), American basketball player
- Brayton Bowman, American singer-songwriter
- Brian Bowman (born 1946), American euphoniumist and professor
- Brian Bowman (politician) (born 1971), 43rd mayor of Winnipeg
- Brooks Bowman (1913–1937), American composer
- Bruce Bowman (1945–2020), American aerospace engineer

== C ==
- Carl Bowman (born 1957), American sociologist
- Carol Bowman (born 1950), American writer
- Caroline Bowman (born 1988), American musical theatre actress
- Caron Bowman, Afro Honduran American painter
- Carrie Bowman (1887–1971), American stage actress
- Catherine Bowman, American poet
- Charles Bowman (accountant) (born 1961), British accountant
- Charles Calvin Bowman (1852–1941), American politician
- Charles F. Bowman (1919–2009), American businessman
- Charles Lewis Bowman (1890–1971), American architect
- Charles Martin Bowman (1863–1932), Canadian politician
- Charles Sumner Bowman (1873–?), American architect
- Charlie Bowman (1889–1962), American musician
- Chester Bowman (1901–1936), American sprinter
- Chris Bowman (writer), American screenwriter
- Christian Bowman, American actor
- Christopher Bowman (1967–2008), American figure skater
- Christopher N. Bowman (born 1967), American chemical engineer
- Chuck Bowman (born 1937), American filmmaker
- Chuck Bowman (American football), American football coach, athletic administrator
- Clement Bowman (1930–2021), Canadian chemical engineer
- Clifford Bowman (1899–1978), British flying ace
- Cooper Bowman (born 2000), American baseball player
- Courtney Bowman (born 1995), English stage actress and singer
- Cynthia Grant Bowman, American lawyer

== D ==
- Danielle Bowman (born 1988), English footballer
- Dave Bowman (footballer, born 1964), Scottish footballer
- Dave Bowman (musician) (1914–1964), American jazz pianist
- Dave Bowman (trade unionist) (1913–1996), Scottish trade unionist and activist
- David Bowman (bishop) (1932–2015), American Episcopal bishop
- David Bowman (botanist) (1838–1868), British botanist
- David Bowman (footballer, born 1960), English footballer
- David Bowman (politician) (1860–1916), Australian politician
- David Bowman (writer) (1957–2012), American writer
- Debbie Bowman-Sullivan (born 1963), Australian field hockey player
- Deborah Bowman (ethicist), British academic
- Dick Bowman (1930–1983), American football player and coach
- Don Bowman (judge) (1933–2022), Canadian judge
- Don Bowman (politician) (1936–2013), Australian politician
- Don Bowman (singer) (1937–2013), American country music singer-songwriter
- Donald Bowman, Extended family and heritage of JD Vance
- Dorla Bowman (born c. 1952), Belizean human rights activist
- Drayson Bowman (born 1989), American ice hockey player

== E ==
- Eddie Bowman (born 1944), English rugby league footballer
- Eddowes Bowman (1810–1869), British dissenting tutor
- Edith Bowman (born 1974), Scottish radio DJ and television presenter
- Edward M. Bowman (politician) (fl. 1883), American politician
- Edward Morris Bowman (1848–1913), American organist and music educator
- Edward R. Bowman (c. 1826 – 1898), Union Navy Medal of Honor recipient
- Edward Kellett-Bowman (1931–2022), British consultant and politician
- Edwin Bowman (born 1946), American politician
- Elaine Kellett-Bowman (1923–2014), British politician
- Eileen Bowman (born 1966), American actress
- Elizabeth Bowman (c. 1677 – 1707), English actress
- Elmer Bowman (1897–1985), American baseball player
- Emmett Bowman (1885–1912), American Negro league baseball player
- Erin Bowman (born 1990), American pop singer and songwriter
- Ernie Bowman (1935–2019), American baseball player
- Euday L. Bowman (1886–1949), American pianist and composer
- Everett Bowman (1899–1971), Rodeo cowboy

== F ==
- F. DuBois Bowman, American biostatistician
- Fallon Bowman (born 1983), Canadian rock musician
- Frank Bowman (born 1944), United States admiral
- Frank Llewellyn Bowman (1879–1936), American attorney and politician
- Frank O. Bowman (1896–1978), United States Army general

== G ==
- Geoffrey Bowman (born 1946), British lawyer
- Geoffrey Hilton Bowman (1891–1970), British WW1 fighter ace
- George Bowman (Australian politician) (1795–1878), Australian politician
- George Bowman (baseball) (1883–1958), American Negro league baseball player
- George Bowman (footballer) (born 1872), Scottish footballer
- George Bowman (pioneer) (1699–1768), American pioneer and Indian fighter
- George Bowman (Zen master), American Buddhist monk
- George A. Bowman (1890–1957), American politician
- George S. Bowman Jr. (1911–2005), American Major general
- Gerald Bowman (born 1989), American football player
- Ghee Bowman (1961–2025), British historian
- Gordon Bowman (1927–2013), Australian rules footballer
- Grace Bowman (equestrian) (born 1990), Australian equestrian
- Graham Bowman (born 1993), Scottish footballer
- Graham Bowman-Manifold (1871–1940), British Army general

== H ==
- Harold Bowman (1903–1957), GB & England international rugby league footballer
- Harry Bowman (1949–2019), American outlaw biker and gangster
- Henry Bowman (architect) (1814–1883), English church architect and architectural historian
- Henry Bowman (composer) (fl. 1677), English musician
- Henry Robson Bowman (1896–1954), Canadian politician
- Herbert Bowman (1897–1980), American tennis player
- Hugh Bowman (born 1980), Australian jockey
- Humphrey Bowman (1879–1965), British civil servant

== I ==
- Ira Bowman (born 1973), American basketball player and coach
- Isa Bowman (1874–1958), British actress
- Isaac Bowman (1757–1826), American soldier and militia officer
- Isaac Erb Bowman (1832–1897), Canadian politician and businessman
- Isaiah Bowman (1878–1950), American geographer

== J ==
- J. H. Bowman (died 1940), English politician
- Jack Bowman (1932–2022), American politician
- Jack Bowman (rugby league) (1930–2007), Australian rugby league footballer
- Jacob Bowman (1733–1781), American pioneer
- Jamaal Bowman (born 1976), American politician and educator
- James Bowman (Canadian politician) (1861–1940), Canadian politician
- James Bowman (countertenor) (1941–2023), English singer
- James Bowman (musician) (born 1980), American musician
- James Bowman (painter) (1793–1842), American painter
- James Bowman (surgeon) (1784–1846), English-born Australian politician and surgeon
- James Cloyd Bowman (1880–1961), American writer
- James Donald Bowman (born 1984), birth name of JD Vance, Vice President of the United States since 2025
- James E. Bowman (1923–2011), American geneticist and pathologist
- James F. Bowman (1826–1882), American journalist and writer
- James Langstaff Bowman (1879–1951), Canadian politician
- Jan Bowman (born 1953), Australian basketball player
- Jane Bowman, American singer
- Janine Bowman (born 1973), American sport shooter
- Jerry Bowman (born 1962), American NASCAR driver
- Jessica Bowman (born 1980s), American actress
- Jim Bowman (American football) (born 1963), American football player
- Jim Bowman (basketball), American basketball coach
- Sir Jim Bowman, 1st Baronet, British trade unionist and businessman
- Joe Bowman (baseball) (1910–1990), American baseball player
- Joe Bowman (footballer) (1902–1941), English footballer
- Joe Bowman (marksman) (1925–2009), American bootmaker and marksman
- Joel Bowman (born 1948), American chemist
- John Bowman (actor) (1651–1739), British stage actor
- John Bowman (broadcaster) (born 1942), Irish historian and broadcaster
- John Bowman (Canadian football) (born 1982), American gridiron football player and coach
- John Bowman (footballer) (1879–1943), English footballer and manager
- John Bowman (Nevada politician) (1824–1899), American politician
- John Bowman (New York politician) (1782–1853), American politician
- John Bowman (pioneer) (1738–1784), American militia officer
- John Bowman (screenwriter) (1957–2021), American television writer and producer
- John Bryan Bowman (1824–1891), American lawyer and educator
- John F. Bowman (1880–1960), American politician
- John Eddowes Bowman the Elder, British banker and naturalist
- John Eddowes Bowman the Younger (1819–1854), English chemist
- John Gabbert Bowman (1877–1962), American poet
- John Maxwell Bowman (1925–2005), Canadian pediatrician
- John McEntee Bowman (1875–1931), Canadian-American businessman
- Jonathan Bowman (1828–1895), American lawyer and politician
- Jonathan Philbin Bowman (1969–2000), Irish broadcaster and journalist
- Joseph Bowman (1752–1779), American militia officer
- Josephine Beatrice Bowman (1881–1971), US Navy nurse
- Josh Bowman (born 1988), English actor
- Judith Bowman, American businesswoman
- Judy Bowman (born 1952), American collage artist

== K ==
- Karl Bowman (1888–1973), American psychiatrist
- Karlyn Bowman, American editor
- Keith Bowman, American materials scientist
- Kelley Bowman (born 1983), American high jumper
- Ken Bowman (1942–2023), American football player
- Ken Bowman (rugby league) (1937–2013), English rugby league footballer
- Kerry Bowman, Canadian academic
- Kimiko O. Bowman (1927–2019), Japanese-American statistician
- Kirk Bowman (born 1951), Canadian ice hockey player
- Kristin Bowman-James, American chemist
- Ky Bowman (born 1997), American basketball player

== L ==
- Laura Bowman (1881–1957), American actress
- Laurence George Bowman (1866–1950), British politician
- Lee Bowman (1914–1979), American actor
- Leroy Bowman (1912–2014), US Army Air Force officer
- Leslie Greene Bowman (born 1956), American museum administrator
- Leslie W. Bowman (born 1949), American painter and illustrator
- Lisa Bowman (born 1988), Northern Ireland netball player
- Louise Morey Bowman (1882–1944), Canadian poet

== M ==
- Maddie Bowman (born 1994), American freestyle skier
- Marcellus Bowman (born 1986), American gridiron football player
- Margaret Bowman (1928–2018), American actor
- Marguerite Bowman (1918–1997), American politician
- Marion Bowman (born 1955), British academic
- Mark Bowman, American football player
- Mary Bowman (1908–2002), American economist
- Matt Bowman (born 1991), American baseball player
- Matthew Bowman (born 1990), English footballer
- Matty Bowman (born 2000), English footballer
- Max Bowman, American football and baseball coach
- Michelle Bowman (born 1971), American attorney

== N ==
- Nate Bowman (1943–1984), American basketball player
- Nathaniel Bowman (1608–1682), American settler
- NaVorro Bowman (born 1988), American football player
- Ned Bowman (born 2006), Australian rules footballer
- Noah Bowman (born 1992), Canadian freestyle skier

== O ==
- Olly Bowman (born 2000), Australian internet personality and musician

== P ==
- Pasco Bowman II (born 1933), American judge
- Patricia Bowman (1908–1999), American dancer
- Paul Bowman (academic), British academic
- Paul Bowman (rugby league) (born 1976), Australian rugby league footballer
- Peter Bowman (born 1937), American politician
- Philip Bowman (born 1952), Australian businessman
- Phyllis Bowman (1926–2012), British journalist and pro-life campaigner
- Priscilla Bowman (1928–1988), American singer

== R ==
- R. T. V. Bowman (1875–1899), American sports coach
- Ralph Bowman (1911–1990), Canadian ice hockey player
- Raymond D. Bowman (1917–2001), American journalist
- Richard Bowman (cricketer) (1934–2005), English cricketer
- Richard Irving Bowman (1918–2001), American artist
- Richie Bowman (born 1954), English footballer
- Rob Bowman (director) (born 1960), American film director
- Rob Bowman (footballer) (born 1975), English footballer
- Rob Bowman (music writer) (born 1956), Canadian ethnomusicologist and writer
- Robert Bowman (journalist) (c. 1910 – 1984, Canadian broadcast journalist
- Robert A. Bowman, American businessman
- Robert Benson Bowman (1808–1882), English bookseller and publisher
- Robert M. Bowman Jr. (born 1957), American theologian
- Robert M. Bowman (1934–2013), American US Air Force officer
- Roger Bowman (1927–1997), American baseball player
- Ronnie Bowman (1961–2026), American singer and composer
- Roscoe Bowman (1900–1964), American fencer
- Rose Bowman (1945–2017), American politician
- Rudy Bowman (1890–1972), American actor
- Ryan Bowman (born 1991), English association football player

== S ==
- Sally Anne Bowman (1987–2005), British murder victim
- Samuel Bowman (1800–1861), American bishop
- Samuel C. Bowman (1822–1898), American politician
- Sandra Bowman (born 1967), British swimmer
- Sarah A. Bowman (1813–1866), American innkeeper, restaurateur, and madam
- Scarlett Bowman (born 1985), English actress
- Scott Bowman (academic), Australian academic
- Scotty Bowman (born 1933), Canadian ice hockey coach
- Selwyn Z. Bowman (1840–1928), American attorney and politician
- Seymour Bowman (1621–1704), English politician
- Shawn Bowman (born 1984), Canadian baseball player & coach
- Sidney Bowman (1907–1986), American triple jumper
- Simon Bowman (born 1961), British actor and singer
- Snow Bowman (1915–1992), New Zealand rugby union player
- Stan Bowman (born 1973), Canadian ice hockey businessman
- Stephanie Bowman, Canadian politician
- Steve Bowman (born 1967), American rock drummer and songwriter
- Steve Bowman (American football) (1944–2017), American football player
- Steven Bowman, American historian
- Stuart Bowman (actor), Scottish actor
- Stuart Bowman (canoeist) (born 1975), British slalom canoeist
- Sumner Bowman (1867–1954), American baseball player

== T ==
- Thaddeus Bowman (1712–1806), American soldier in Revolutionary War
- Thea Bowman (1937–1990), American Roman Catholic religious sister and civil rights activist
- Thomas Bowman (Evangelical Association bishop) (1836–1923), American bishop of the Evangelical Association
- Thomas Bowman (Iowa politician) (1848–1917), American politician
- Thomas Bowman (Merton) (1853–1945), English academic
- Thomas Bowman (Methodist Episcopal bishop) (1817–1914), American bishop of the Methodist Episcopal Church
- Thomas Elliot Bowman III (1918–1995), American carcinologist
- Thomas G. Bowman (born 1946), American political aide
- Tim Bowman (born 1959), American smooth jazz gospel musician
- Tim Bowman Jr. (born 1987), American gospel musician
- Tod Bowman (born 1965), American politician
- Tom Bowman (journalist), American radio journalist
- Tom Bowman (rugby union) (born 1976), Australian rugby union player
- Tommy Bowman (1873–1958), Scottish footballer

== U ==
- Urban Bowman (1937–2018), American-Canadian gridiron football player and coach

== V ==
- Valerie Bowman, American novelist
- Veronica Bowman, British statistician
- Vicky Bowman (born 1966), British diplomat

== W ==
- Waldo G. Bowman (1900–1995), American magazine editor
- Walter Bowman (antiquary) (died 1782), Scottish antiquary
- Walter Bowman (soccer) (1870–1948), Canadian soccer player
- Walter S. Bowman (1865–1938), American photographer
- Wendell P. Bowman (1847–1928), US army major general
- Wendy Bowman (born 1945), British actor
- Wendy Bowman (activist) (c. 1934–2023), Australian environmentalist
- Willard L. Bowman (1919–1975), American politician
- William Bowman (Australian politician) (1800–1874), Australian politician
- William Bowman (director) (1884–1960), American actor, writer, and director
- William Bowman (miller) (ca. 1811 – 1894), Australian pastoralist
- William C. Bowman (1882–1974), American politician
- William Ernest Bowman (1911–1985), English writer
- William N. Bowman (1868–1944), American architect
- William S. Bowman (politician) (1822–1901), American politician
- Sir William Bowman, 1st Baronet (1816–1892), English surgeon, histologist and anatomist
- Wink Bowman (1916–2001), American basketball player
- Wright Elemakule Bowman Sr. (1907–2003), American and Hawaiian woodworker, traditional canoe builder, and educator
- Wirt Bowman (1874–1949), American politician
- Woody Bowman (1941–2015), American politician and educator

== Z ==
- Zack Bowman (born 1984), American football player

== See also ==
- Bowman (disambiguation)
