= John Bowman =

John Bowman may refer to:

- John Bowman (actor) (1651–1739), British stage actor
- John Bowman (Nevada politician) (1824/25–1899), American lawyer, served as member and speaker of the Nevada Assembly
- John Bowman (broadcaster) (born 1942), Irish historian and broadcaster
- John Bowman (Canadian football) (born 1982), former player and current coach
- John Bowman, co-founder of Chrome Hearts
- John Bowman (footballer) (1879–1943), English football player and manager
- John Bowman (pastoralist) (1828–1900), South Australian pioneer
- John Bowman (pioneer) (1738–1784), Virginia and Kentucky soldier and official
- John Bowman (New York politician) (1782–1853), New York politician, served in both houses of the state legislature
- John Bowman (screenwriter) (1957–2021), writer for Saturday Night Live
- John Bryan Bowman (1824–1891), Kentucky educator, founder of Kentucky University
- John Eddowes Bowman the Elder (1785–1841), British banker and naturalist
- John Eddowes Bowman the Younger (1819–1854), English chemist
- John Gabbert Bowman (1877–1962), American educator
- John McEntee Bowman (1875–1931), American hotelier
- John F. Bowman (1880–1960), American politician and mayor of Salt Lake City
- John Bowman, 4th Baronet (1904–1994), of the Bowman baronets
- John Bowman (1701–1797), Lord Provost of Glasgow

== See also ==
- Jonathan Philbin Bowman (1969–2000), Irish journalist
- Jack Bowman (1932–2022), American politician
- Bowman (disambiguation)
