= William Bowman =

William, Willie, Will, Bill, or Billy Bowman may refer to:

== Sportspeople ==
- Bill Bowman (baseball) (1867–1944), American baseball player for the Chicago Colts
- Bill Bowman (American football) (1931–2008), American football player for the Detroit Lions and Pittsburgh Steelers
- Scotty Bowman or William Scott Bowman (born 1933), Canadian hockey coach
- Bill Bowman (racing driver) (fl. 1950s), NASCAR driver

== Other people ==
- William Bowman Felton (1782–1837), British naval officer and political figure
- William Bowman (Australian politician) (1800–1874)
- William Bowman (miller) (c. 1811–1894) pioneer farmer and flour miller of South Australia.
- Sir William Bowman, 1st Baronet (1816–1892), English histologist and ophthalmologist
- William S. Bowman (politician) (1822–1901), American politician and engineer
- William Charles Bowman (c. 1830–1879), Australian pastoralist
- Sir William Bowman, 2nd Baronet (1846–1917), English baronet
- William Norman Bowman (1868–1944), American architect based in Denver, Colorado
- William Bowman (director) (1884–1960), American director, actor and writer
- William Ernest Bowman (1911–1985), English engineer and writer
- Beau Dollar or William Hargis Bowman, Jr. (1941–2011), American soul vocalist and drummer
- Bill Bowman (American politician) (1946–2020), member of the North Dakota state senate
- Bill Bowman (Scottish politician) (born 1950), Scottish politician, member of the Scottish Parliament, 2016–2021

== See also ==
- Bowman (disambiguation)
