= John Eddowes Bowman =

John Eddowes Bowman may refer to:

- John Eddowes Bowman the Elder (1785–1841), English banker and naturalist
- John Eddowes Bowman the Younger (1819–1854), English chemist
