= Joe Bowman =

Joe Bowman may refer to:

- Joe Bowman (baseball) (1910–1990), American baseball pitcher
- Joe Bowman (footballer) (1902–1941), English footballer
- Joe Bowman (marksman) (1925–2009), Houston bootmaker and marksman
- Joseph Bowman (1752–1779), Virginia militia officer
- Joe Bowman, fictional character on the Australian soap opera Home and Away
- A character from Call of Duty: Black Ops
