= David Bowman =

David or Dave Bowman may refer to:

- David Bowman (Space Odyssey), a character in the Space Odyssey series
- David Bowman (footballer, born 1960), English footballer
- Dave Bowman (footballer, born 1964), English-born Scottish footballer
- David Bowman (botanist) (1838–1868), English botanist who collected plants for James Veitch & Sons
- David Bowman (politician) (1860–1916), Queensland Leader of the Opposition, 1908–1912
- David Bowman (bishop) (1932–2015), bishop of the Episcopal Church of the United States
- Dave Bowman (musician) (1914–1964), American jazz pianist
- Dave Bowman (trade unionist) (1913–1996), Scottish trade unionist and political activist
- David Bowman, member of the Vancouver-based band soulDecision
- David Bowman Schneder (1857–1938), American missionary
- David Bowman (writer) (1957–2012), American writer
