= Paul Bowman =

Paul Bowman may refer to:

- Paul Bowman (rugby league) (born 1976), Australian rugby league footballer
- Paul Bowman-MacDonald, a fictional character from Monarch of the Glen
- Paul Bowman (academic), teacher at Cardiff University
- Paul Bowman, 5th Baronet (1921–2003), of the Bowman baronets

== See also ==
- Bowman (disambiguation)
