= Eddowes =

Eddowes may refer to:

- Catherine Eddowes (1842–1888), victim in the Whitechapel murders.
- Michael Eddowes (1903—1992), British lawyer.
- John Eddowes Bowman the Elder (1785–1841), British banker and naturalist.
- John Eddowes Bowman the Younger (1819–1854), English chemist.
- Steve Eddowes, chairman of the English Defence League.
- Eddowes Bowman (1810–1869), dissenting tutor.
