= Richard Bowman =

Richard Bowman may refer to:

- Dick Bowman (1930–1983), American football player and coach
- Richard Bowman (cricketer) (1934–2005), English cricketer
- Richard Irving Bowman (1918–2001), American painter
- Richie Bowman (born 1954), English footballer
