= Beatrice Redpath =

Canadian poet and short story writer

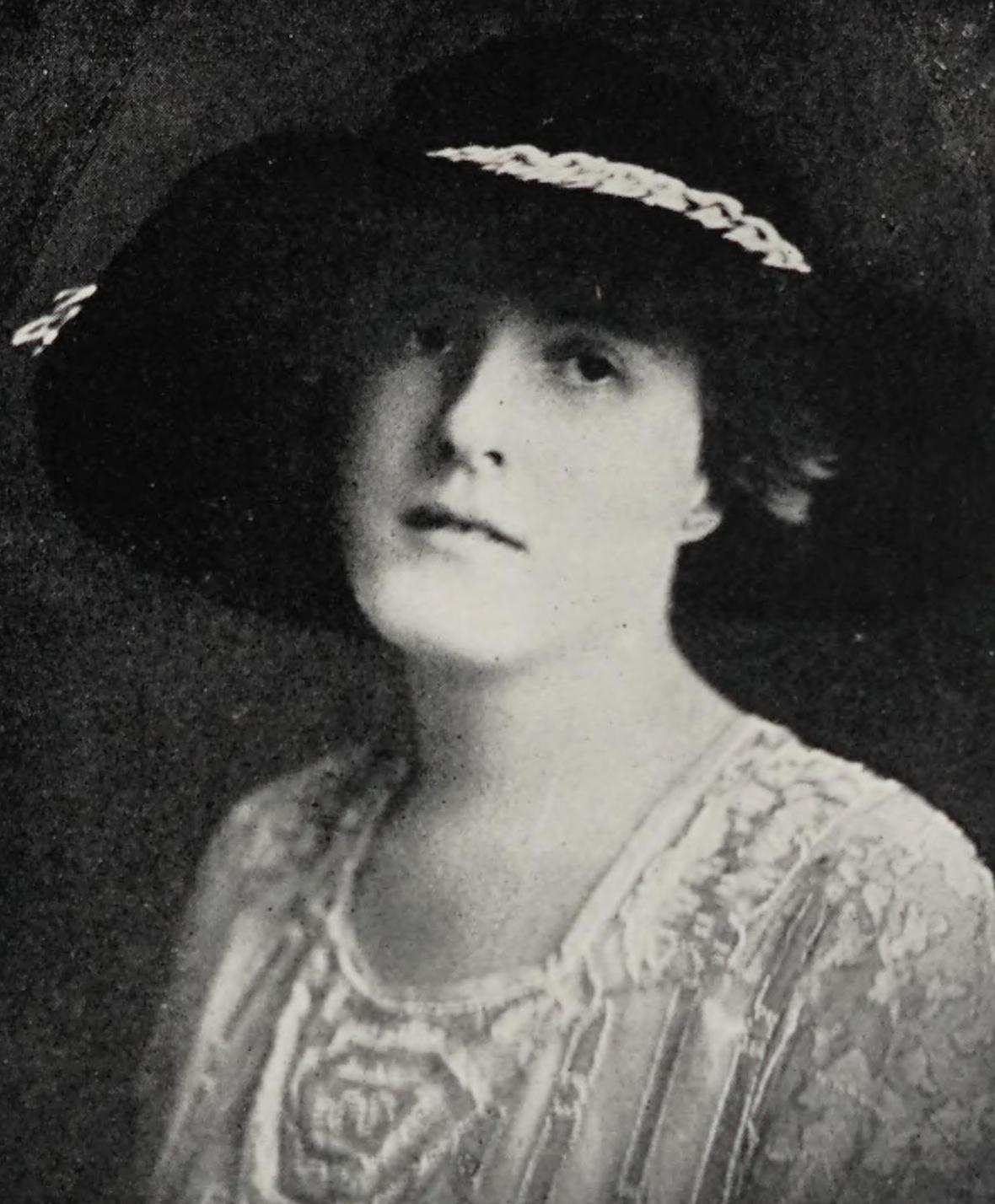
- Born: Beatrice Constance Peterson; June 19, 1886 Montreal, Canada
- Died: February 11, 1937 (aged 50) Montreal
- Resting place: Mount Royal Cemetery, Montreal
- Occupation: writer
- Language: English
- Genre: poetry; short stories
- Spouse: William Redpath (m. 1910; died 1936)
- Children: J. P. Redpath

Signature
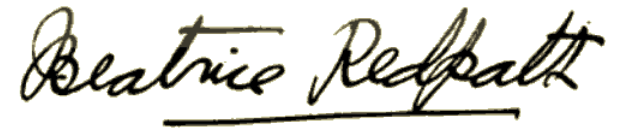

Beatrice Redpath (née Peterson; June 19, 1886 – February 11, 1937) was a Canadian poet and short story writer. As with Victoria Grace Blackburn, Louise Morey Bowman, and Wilson MacDonald, Redpath was considered a poet of Canada's "Restoration Period". She was also a recipient of the Imperial Order Daughters of the Empire (I.O.D.E.) prize for short story. Redpath died in 1937.

== Early life and education ==
Beatrice Constance Peterson was born in Montreal, June 19, 1886. Her father was Peter Alexander Peterson, Chief Engineer of the Canadian Pacific Railway. Her mother's maiden surname was Langlois. Beatrice had an older brother and an older sister. Both parents were native Canadians.

Peterson was educated in private schools in her native city, until she was seventeen years old, when she moved to Goderich, Ontario, and lived there for five years.

== Career ==
She began seriously to write in 1905.

In 1910, she married William Redpath (d. 1936), then of Montreal, and for some years, they lived in Toronto. They had one son, J. P. Redpath.

In 1913, Redpath and other young Canadian poets and prose writers may be regarded as having begun the Second Renaissance in Canadian literature. They inaugurated, as it were, a Restoration Period in Canadian literature, with some changes in ideals of form and craftsmanship. In 1915, her first book, Drawn Shutters, was published in London by John Lane. The same publisher brought out her second book, White Lilac, in 1921. Her poems include, "Earth Love", "To One Lying Dead", "Rebellion", "The Daughter of Jairus", and "My Thoughts".

Redpath's main area of writing was the short story, and in it, she achieved much success. In 1923, she won the I.O.D.E. prize of $200 for the best Canadian short story. For many years, she contributed her stories to periodicals in Canada, England, and the U.S.

== Personal life ==
Earlier in her life, Redpath resided at St. Hilaire and at Toronto. She died at her home in Montreal, 11 February 1937. Interment was at Mount Royal Cemetery.

== Reception ==
"When a poet belongs to no clique or côterie, nor has established a reputation, opinions come uneasily. Beatrice Red path in 'Drawn Shutters' can be commonplace in the noble contemplation of essential life: a virtue in poetry. She comes down at times to the minor level of 'The Dancer.' But ‘To One Lying Dead' is a poem of true loveliness, elegiac without dullness, eloquent without gush. Beatrice Red path feels the passions of rebellion and indignation. But to her they imply more than mere dissatisfaction and chafing. Indeed, one might make the quality of those passions the supreme test of character, certainly of poetic power. There is evidence in the volume of life lived at first hand, of the discipline of actuality that forces people either to a calm, strong normality, or to hectic agony, and disquietness of spirit. And it is because the poet soul rises to the reality of experience that her poems will not depress. Of her brief songs it may be said that they come like sunshine amid clouds, themselves noble and impressive." -T. P.'s Weekly.

== Awards ==
- I.O.D.E. prize for short story, 1923

== Selected works ==
- Drawn Shutters, 1914
- White Lilac, 1921
