= Rejoice in the Lord alway =

Verse anthem by Henry Purcell

- by Henry Purcell
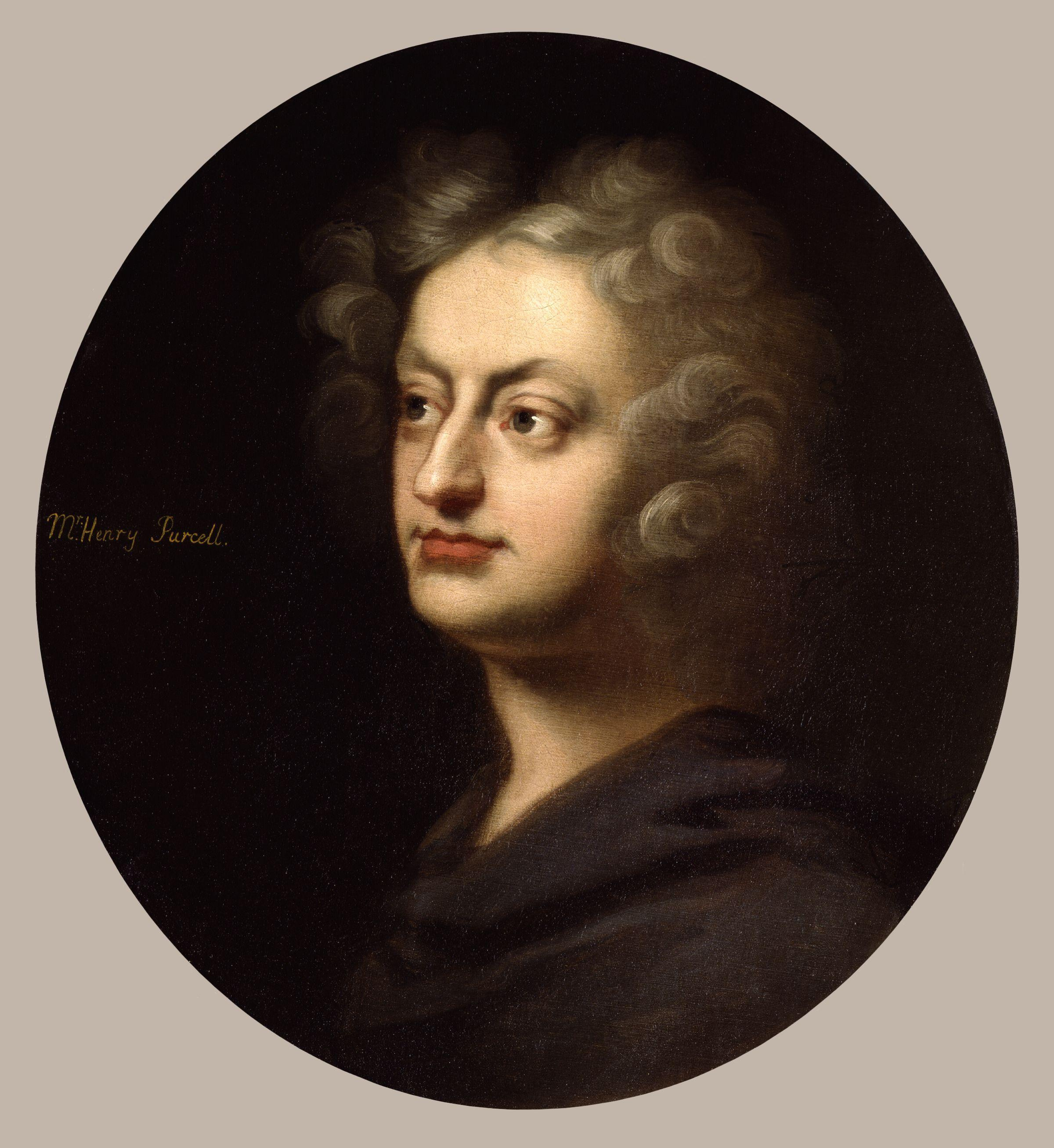
- Portrait of Henry Purcell by John Closterman
- Catalogue: Z. 49
- Genre: Choral music
- Form: Verse anthem, symphony anthem
- Text: Philippians 4: 4–7
- Language: English
- Composed: c. 1683–1685
- Duration: 8 minutes
- Scoring: SATB choir, soloists (countertenor, tenor and bass) and strings or organ

"Rejoice in the Lord alway" (c. 1683–1685), Z. 49, sometimes known as the Bell Anthem, is a verse anthem by Henry Purcell. It was originally scored for SATB choir, countertenor, tenor and bass soloists, and strings, though it is also sometimes performed with organ replacing the strings. It has always been one of Purcell's better-known works, and is today his most popular anthem and probably the most often performed of all verse anthems.

== Text ==
The text of this anthem is the epistle for the Fourth Sunday of Advent, Philippians 4: 4–7:

Rejoice in the Lord alway: and again I say, Rejoice.
Let your moderation be known unto all men. The Lord is at hand.
Be careful for nothing; but in everything by prayer and supplication with thanksgiving let your requests be made known unto God.
And the peace of God, which passeth all understanding, shall keep your hearts and minds through Christ Jesus.

== Music ==
"Rejoice in the Lord alway", like many of Purcell's anthems, begins with a symphony (here called a prelude), which has been acclaimed for its "luminous part-writing" and "wonderful sheen". This is based on a ten-beat descending scale ostinato which, like the upper parts, imitates the pealing of bells. The three soloists introduce an eight-bar theme in triple time which is then repeated and developed by the strings. The soloists recapitulate their theme before moving to a second one, to which the choir responds joyfully, sometimes interrupted by the soloists singing "and again". This section ends with the strings playing the symphony again. In a passage of a more sober quality the bass sings "Be careful for nothing", then there is a homophonic evocation of "the peace of God which passeth all understanding", developed by the strings. The initial triple-time theme returns, being performed first by the soloists, then the strings, and finally the choir in "brilliantly climactic" fashion.

== History ==
The anthem was written c. 1683–1685, when Purcell was in his mid-twenties. The scoring for stringed instruments shows that it must have been intended for the Chapel Royal, the only institution which used strings for services, where it would have been performed in the presence of the king. The fact that there are more than 50 surviving manuscripts of the score, some very early, suggests that it was a popular work from the first. One of the earliest calls it the Bell Anthem, a name by which it has continued to be known down to the present day. The Chapel Royal's abandonment of the use of strings in the 1690s, as also the adoption of this anthem by many English and Irish cathedrals, made necessary its arrangement in various non-instrumental versions. 47 manuscripts of these survive, as against seven of Purcell's original version. The popularity of "Rejoice in the Lord alway" has never faded: it is now the best-known of Purcell's many anthems, and probably the most frequently performed of all verse anthems.
