= Ghee Bowman =

British historian (1961–2025)

- Born: 1961
- Died: 10 May 2025 (aged 63–64)
- Occupation: Historian
- Parent: William Ernest Bowman

Academic background
- Education: University of Exeter
- Thesis: ‘No Pakis at Dunkirk’: Remembering and Forgetting Force K6 in Europe 1939-1945 (2019)

Academic work
- Discipline: History
- Sub-discipline: Military history; World War II; History of India; History of the United Kingdom; Global history; History of Devon

Ghee Bowman (1961 – 10 May 2025) was a British historian best known for his work on the Indian Army in the European theatre of World War II.

== Career ==
Bowman spent many years researching the history of the Indian soldiers in the Second World War who were present at the Dunkirk evacuation, in Britain, and in other parts of the European theatre of the war. Bowman considered this history, and the cultural exchange around it, forgotten and underexplored.

In 2020, Bowman's book The Indian Contingent: The Forgotten Muslim Soldiers of Dunkirk was published by The History Press. In 2021, the book was published in India by Pan MacMillan. The book includes sections on the experience of Indian soldiers training in the Scottish Highlands, and was praised by Scottish politician Anas Sarwar. Bowman told The Times of India he hoped the book would 'help tackle small-mindedness and bigotry'.

Bowman then researched the experience of the 15,000 Indian soldiers who were captured and held in Nazi-occupied Europe during World War II, in particular the Indian prisoners of war at Épinal, who staged the largest successful POW escape of World War II.

In 2024, Bowman's book The Great Épinal Escape: Indian Prisoners of War in German Hands was published by The History Press. As well as documenting the Indian prisoners of war and the escape from the camp, the book also explores the role of race and racism in both the events concerned and the lack of memorialisation.

== Other work ==
During his career, Bowman undertook various work in the theatre, for non-governmental organisations, and in education, both in the UK and internationally.

In 2013, Bowman led a history project researching and presenting the multicultural history of the city of Exeter. He continued to provide public education on local multicultural history for many years.

Bowman was a noted anti-racism activist in Exeter's local community. He worked for the charity Devon Development Education for over two decades.

== Personal life ==
Bowman was a Quaker and a chaplain at the University of Exeter. For many years, he volunteered for The Woodcraft Folk. His father was William Ernest Bowman, author of The Ascent of Rum Doodle. He had two children.

In early 2025, Bowman received treatment for a brain tumour. He died on 10 May 2025.

== Selected works ==
- The Indian Contingent: The Forgotten Muslim Soldiers of Dunkirk. The History Press, 2020
  - The Indian Contingent: The Forgotten Muslim Soldiers of the Battle of Dunkirk. Pan Macmillan India, 2021
- The Great Épinal Escape: Indian Prisoners of War in German Hands. The History Press, 2024
