= Bouwman =

Bouwman is a Dutch surname. It may be an occupational surname meaning farmer, gardener, a cognate of German Baumann. It may refer to:

- Aaron Bouwman (born 2007), Dutch footballer
- Corry Vreeken-Bouwman (1928–2025), Dutch chess player
- Emilie Bouwman (b. 1943), Dutch model and fashion designer
- Harry Bouwman (b. 1953), Dutch Information systems researcher
- Henk Bouwman (1926–1995), Dutch field hockey player, father of Roderik
- Jan Bouwman (1935–1999), Dutch swimmer
- Koen Bouwman (b. 1993), Dutch racing cyclist
- Mies Bouwman (1929–2018), Dutch television host
- Pim Bouwman (b. 1991), Dutch football midfielder
- Roderik Bouwman (b. 1957), Dutch field hockey player, son of Henk
- Theo Bouwman (b. 1947), Dutch GreenLeft politician

Bouwmans:

- Eddy Bouwmans (b. 1968), Dutch racing cyclist

== See also ==
- Bowman
