= Henry Bowman =

Henry Bowman may refer to:

- Henry Bowman (composer) (fl. 1677), English composer
- Henry Bowman (architect) (1814–1883), English architect
- Henry Robson Bowman (1896–1954), politician in British Columbia, Canada
- Henry Bowman, protagonist of Unintended Consequences
