= Walter Bowman =

Walter Bowman may refer to:

- Walter Bowman (soccer) (1870–1948), Canadian soccer player
- Walter S. Bowman (1865–1938), photographer in Pendleton, Oregon
- Walter Bowman (antiquary) (died 1782), Scottish antiquary
