= Rumdoodle Peak =

Airport near Mawson Station, Antarctica

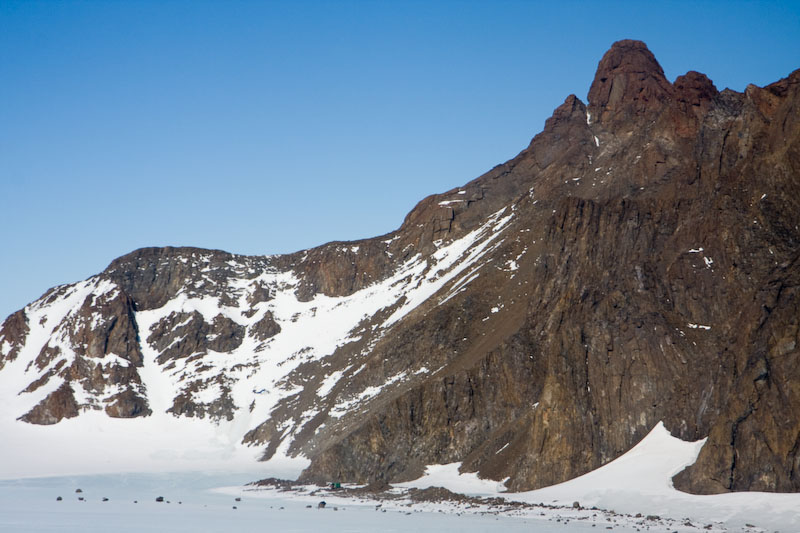
- Rumdoodle Peak with the small green hut visible at the base, to the left of centre

Highest point
- Elevation: 875 m (2,871 ft)
- Coordinates: 67°46′17.1″S 62°49′48.7″E

Geography
- Location: Mac. Robertson Land; Antarctica
- Parent range: North Masson Range

Rumdoodle Ski Landing Area
- IATA: none; ICAO: AT21

Summary
- Airport type: Private
- Location: Mawson Station
- Time zone: (+5)
- Elevation AMSL: 1,605 ft / 489 m
- Coordinates: 67°44′58″S 62°45′56″E

Map
- Location of airfield in Antarctica

Runways
Direction	Length		Surface
Direction	ft	m	Surface
17/35	1,320	402	Ice

Rumdoodle Peak, at elevation of 875 m, is a small but prominent mountain in the north-western part of the North Masson Range of the Framnes Mountains in Antarctica, near Mawson Station.

It was named, around 1960, after the previously fictitious peak featured in the comic novel The Ascent of Rum Doodle by William Ernest Bowman.

== Rumdoodle Hut ==
There is a small hut at the base (elevation of 498m), sleeping 5 people, and two permanently frozen lakes alongside, named Rumdoodle Lake and Lassitude Lake. Located 20 km (12 mi) south of Mawson Station, Rumdoodle Hut was established in 1960; since then it has been severely damaged by blizzards and rebuilt several times, most recently in 2019.

== Rumdoodle Ski Landing Area ==
In late summer when sea ice conditions are unfavourable and the ski landing area (SLA) adjacent to Mawson can no longer be used, air transport operations are moved to Rumdoodle SLA, a field camp on the inland ice plateau 10 km from Mawson.

Rumdoodle SLA has been in use since the 1950s. The glacial surface is subject to wind scouring, melt, snow accumulation and ablation, and requires annual inspection and preparation prior to use. It is accessible from Mawson by Hägglunds ground vehicles.

== See also ==
- Airports in Antarctica
