= Rey Chow =

Cultural critic

- 周蕾
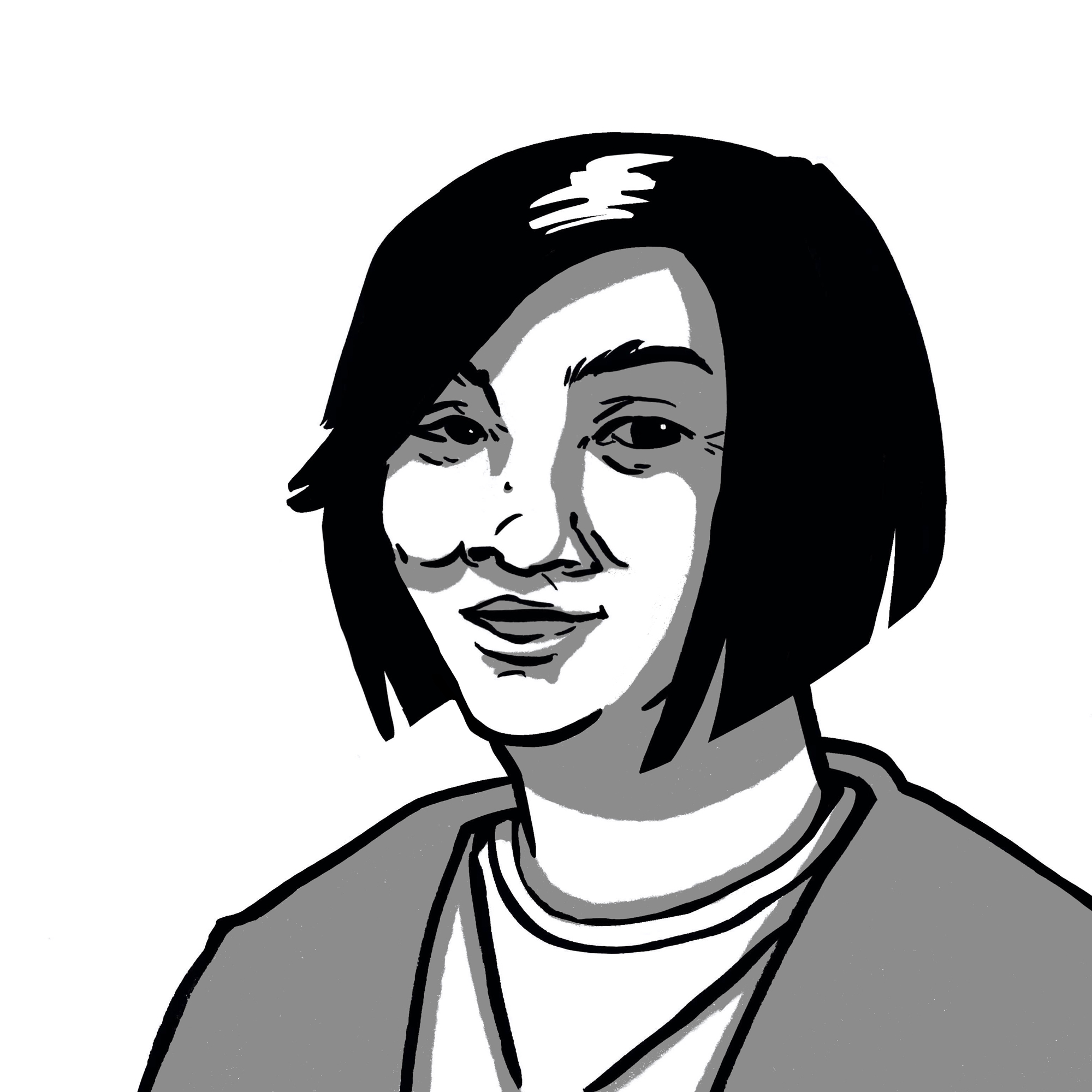
- Born: 1957 (age 68–69); British Hong Kong

Education
- Education: University of Hong Kong; Stanford University

Philosophical work
- School: Postcolonialism, poststructuralism, cultural studies
- Institutions: University of California, Irvine; Brown University; Duke University

Rey Chow
- Traditional Chinese: 周蕾
- Simplified Chinese: 周蕾
Transcriptions
Standard Mandarin
- Hanyu Pinyin: Zhōu Lěi
Yue: Cantonese
- Yale Romanization: Jāu Léuih
- Jyutping: Zau1 Leoi5

Rey Chow (born 1957) is a cultural critic, specializing in 20th-century Chinese fiction and film and postcolonial theory. Educated in Hong Kong and the United States, she has taught at several major American universities, including Brown University. Chow is currently Anne Firor Scott Professor of Literature in Trinity College of Arts and Sciences at Duke University.

Chow's writing challenges assumptions in many different scholarly conversations including those about literature, film, visual media, sexuality and gender, ethnicity, and cross-cultural politics. Inspired by the critical traditions of poststructuralism, postcolonialism, and cultural studies, Chow explores the problematic assumptions about non-Western cultures and ethnic minorities within the context of academic discourse as well as in more public discourses about ethnic and cultural identity. Her critical explorations in visualism, the ethnic subject and cultural translation have been cited by Paul Bowman as being particular influential.

== Early life and academic background ==
Chow was born in Hong Kong and grew up in a Muslim family. She went to high school in Hong Kong and received a bachelor's degree at the University of Hong Kong. She received a doctorate in Modern Thought and Literature from Stanford University in 1986. In 1996, she became a professor in the Comparative Literature Program at the University of California, Irvine. Later, she became Andrew W. Mellon Professor of the Humanities at Brown University. She has led a seminar at the School of Criticism and Theory. Chow currently is the Anne Firor Scott Professor of Literature at Duke University.

== Importance to academia ==
Chow has made important contributions to a number of fields. When analyzing the impact of Rey Chow's work for an article in the journal Social Semiotics, Chow scholar Paul Bowman highlights two important ways in which Chow has affected scholarship: first, she has helped diversify the research agenda of Chinese Studies scholars by problematizing the concept of "modern" and modernity, introducing gender issues, and bringing mass culture to studies of Chinese culture and literature with her first book Woman and Chinese modernity (1991); and, second, she has challenged many assumptions about ethnicity and ethnic studies through her books Ethics After Idealism (1998), The Protestant Ethnic and the Spirit of Capitalism (2002), The Age of the World Target (2006), and Sentimental Fabulations, Contemporary Chinese films (2007). When reviewing The Rey Chow Reader, Alvin Ka Hin Wong called Chow's critical activities as mostly about "provocation" in which she forces new conversations in various scholarly areas, such as the study of Chinese culture, theories of cross-cultural contact and Western critiques of modernity.

Rey Chow's work has also been collected, anthologized and received special recognition in a number of academic spaces. Paul Bowman collected a number of her essays in the Rey Chow Reader published by Columbia University Press. Bowman also provided editorial support for two issues of academic articles focused entirely on Chow. Volume 20, issue 4 of the journal Social Semiotics was devoted to exploring Rey Chow's works as they relate to the field of semiotics. Volume 13, issues 3 of the journal Postcolonial Studies explores the interdisciplinary application of her concepts to postcolonial studies.

Chow has served on the editorial board for a number of academic journals and forums, including differences, Arcade, Diaspora: A Journal of Transnational Studies, and South Atlantic Quarterly, as well as on the advisory board of feminist journal Signs.

== Critical method and topics ==
When exploring Chow's approach to criticism in The Rey Chow Reader, Paul Bowman describes Chow's critical theory as an approach based on poststructuralism, specifically influenced by Derrida's deconstruction, and cultural theory derived from Stuart Hall. In particular, though Chow's research started in literary studies, her later work broaches larger academic concerns, similar to those negotiated by poststructuralist critical theorists. However, even while comparing her work to poststructuralist critical theory, Bowman says that Chow rethinks the concept that post-structuralist arguments need "always make things more complicated," instead trying to make these ideas more manageable. As part of her deconstructionist approach, she is concerned with the problems of signification within parts of society outside of literature.

Using the above-mentioned approach, Chow has made significant interventions in the critical conversation surrounding postcolonial and other critical theory. The following subsections highlight some of Chow's interventions acknowledged by scholarly literature. The first section, looking at visuality and visualism, explores how individuals are converted into symbols or signs, one of her main themes. The second section focuses on the use of signification as it applies to an ethnic subject and how that ethnic subject feels they must represent themselves within society. The third explores how a concept of representation, authenticity, influences how scholars construct translations.

=== Visualism ===
One of Chow's major critiques of modernity relies on the idea of visualism. Visualism is the conversion of things, thoughts or ideas into visual objects, such as film or charts. Chow builds her ideas from the scholarly discourse on Visuality. She relies on two theorists concepts of visuality: Foucault's concept that visual images, such as film, maps or charts, are tools of biopower as well as Heidegger critique that in modern culture everything “becomes a picture”.

Within her work, Chow doesn't see ethnicity as a necessary classification. Rather Chow describes ethnicity as construct created by discourse which is rooted in the impulse to classify and understand the world in the terms of images. Thus for Chow, ethnicity and the creation of the "other" relies on the assumption that individual should and can be classified by their visual features. Speaking within feminist discourses, Chow also uses the idea of visualism to critique the popular concepts of women. For Chow, society consigns women to being visual images. Emphasis on the aesthetic value of women prevents the women from controlling their own relationship to the world, reinforces their position as other thus dehumanizing them and creates an act of violence upon them. Thus, Chow thinks feminists should critique the visuality of women.

=== Ethnic subject ===
One of the central ideas for many critical theorists is the idea of the subject. Rey Chow studies the idea of subjectivity in light of ethnicity, especially the subjectivity of ethnic minorities. In exploring the ethnic subject, she builds on the ideas of Foucault alongside psychoanalytic concepts. One of her central concepts concerning the ethnic subject states that the individual becomes ethnic through the pressure created by social systems to do self-confessional literature, or literature that seeks to explore one's own ethnicity. Through this idea, she challenges the conventional idea that these self-confessional writings can create ethnic liberation. In her book, The Protestant Ethnic and the Spirit of Capitalism, Chow says that

When minority individuals think that, by referring to themselves, they are liberating themselves from the powers that subordinate them, they may actually be allowing such powers to work in the most intimate fashion from within their hearts and souls, in a kind of voluntary surrender that is, in the end, fully complicit with the guilty verdict that has been declared on them socially long before they speak.

For Chow then, the self-confessional literature allows the hegemonic culture to evoke a stereotyped ethnicity from individuals. In describing this stereotyped ethnicity, she focuses on how individuals must act "authentic" in representing an ethnic culture or they become the focus of criticism. Thus society interpellates individuals to perform ethnicity, but the individual only imitates a certain standard of authentic ethnicity because of the coercion created by the larger society. Chow calls these performance of ethnicity "coercive mimeticism", because the individual only simulates ethnicity in reaction to the social pressure placed on that individual to fulfill a certain ethnic role. Also, Chow describes how often the individual who provide the coercion are not of the hegemonic culture, but rather members of ethnic communities. Ethnic individuals become the main source of criticism for other individuals not being "ethnic enough". Thus, for Chow, identification of individuals as "ethnic" can become a tool for belittling amongst individuals of minority cultures as well as a means of maintaining the hegemonic subjugation of those individuals.

=== Cultural translation ===
In the final chapter of her book Primitive Passions, Rey Chow explores the implications of the use of the concept of cultural translation in comparative literature. Cultural translation is the act of presenting cultural objects in another culture while deliberating explaining the elements of the object which are culturally specific to their original culture. In the words of translation critic James Steintrager, Chow challenges "the claims [in cultural translation theory] made on behalf of cultural expertise obscure the ideological and institutional stakes in the rhetoric of faithfulness: the claim to have better access to a culture and to know what it is really about in all its complexity." Chow challenges these faithfulness arguments by exploring how they interfere with the potentially useful process of clarification that can arise when converting a text from one cultural situation to another. Chow sees the clarification as providing the opportunity for obscured cultural practices to become more "visible as a cultural construct." When reviewing her ideas, Steintrager argues that Chow's discussion of assumptions about faithfulness in cultural translation contentiously highlights how postcolonial studies remains bound to close reading and faithful interpretation, without considering the power of simplification.

== Bibliography ==
In addition to publishing a number of academic articles and translations, Chow has published the following books:

- Woman and Chinese Modernity: The Politics of Reading Between West and East. University of Minnesota Press, 1991.
- Writing Diaspora: Tactics of Intervention in Contemporary Cultural Studies. Indiana University Press, 1993.
  - Xie zai jia guo yi wai [寫在家國以外]. Hong Kong: Oxford University Press, 1995.
- Primitive Passions: Visuality, Sexuality, Ethnography, and Contemporary Chinese Cinema.Columbia University Press, 1995.
- Ethics after Idealism: Theory – Culture – Ethnicity – Reading. Indiana University Press, 1998.
- The Protestant Ethnic and the Spirit of Capitalism. Columbia University Press, 2002.
- Il sogno di Butterfly: costellazioni postcoloniali. Rome: Meltemi Editore, 2004. Translated by M.R. Dagostino.
- The Age of the World Target: Self-Referentiality in War, Theory, and Comparative Work. Duke University Press, 2006.
- Sentimental Fabulations, Contemporary Chinese Films: Attachment in the Age of Global Visibility. Columbia University Press, 2007.
- The Rey Chow Reader. New York: Columbia University Press, 2010.
- Entanglements, or Transmedial Thinking about Capture. Duke University Press, 2012.
- Not Like a Native Speaker: On Languaging as a Postcolonial Experience. Columbia University Press, 2014.
- A Face Drawn in Sand: Humanistic Inquiry and Foucault in the Present. Columbia University Press, 2021.
