= Roger Gale =

British Conservative politician

The Right Honourable Sir Roger Gale MP
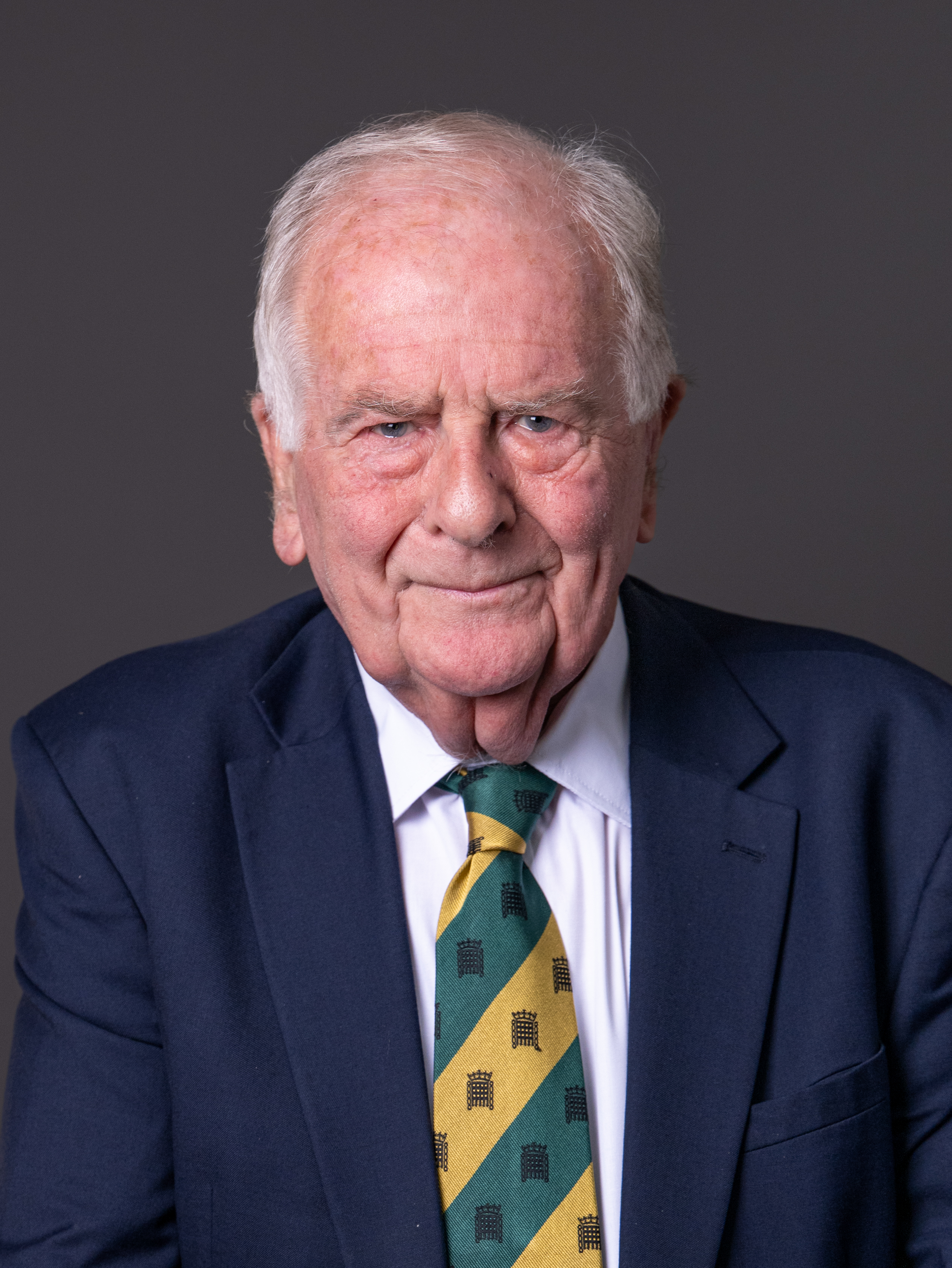
- Official portrait, 2026

Deputy Speaker of the House of Commons
- Acting; 19 December 2022 – 30 May 2024
- Monarch: Charles III
- Prime Minister: Rishi Sunak
- Speaker: Lindsay Hoyle

Member of Parliament for Herne Bay and Sandwich North Thanet (1983–2024)
- Incumbent
- Assumed office 9 June 1983
- Preceded by: Constituency established
- Majority: 2,499 (5.1%)

Personal details
- Born: 20 August 1943 (age 83) Poole, Dorset, England
- Party: Conservative
- Spouse: Susan Gabrielle Marks
- Education: Guildhall School of Music and Drama
- Occupation: Broadcaster, television/radio producer, journalist
- Website: rogergale.com

Sir Roger James Gale (born 20 August 1943) is a British Conservative Party politician who has served as Member of Parliament (MP) for Herne Bay and Sandwich, previously North Thanet, since 1983. A Conservative Party member from 1964, which he combined with his career in journalism and broadcasting until his election as a Conservative MP, in 1983.

He was a prominent and vocal critic of Boris Johnson during his leadership of the Conservative Party.

He is the oldest MP elected in the 2024 general election.

== Early life and education ==
Roger Gale was born on 20 August 1943 in Poole. He was educated at Southbourne Preparatory School and the Thomas Hardye's School in Dorchester. He completed his education at the Guildhall School of Music and Drama in 1963.

== Broadcasting career ==
From August 1964 to January 1965, Gale worked as a radio DJ for Radio Caroline North. He worked as a programme director at Radio Scotland from 1965; personal assistant to the general manager of Universal Films from 1971 to 1972; freelance reporter at BBC Radio London from 1972 to 1973; producer at BBC Radio 1 and then at BBC Radio 4 from 1973 to 1976; became director of BBC Children's Television in 1976 until 1979; then senior producer of children's television and later of special projects at Thames TV from 1979 to 1983.

== Parliamentary career ==
Gale stood as the Conservative candidate in Birmingham Northfield at the 1982 by-election, coming second with 35.6% of the vote behind the Labour candidate John Spellar.

At the 1983 general election, Gale was elected to Parliament as MP for North Thanet with 58.4% of the vote and a majority of 14,051. Gale made his maiden speech in the House of Commons on 30 June 1983.

Gale was re-elected as MP for North Thanet at the 1987 general election with a decreased vote share of 58% and an increased majority of 17,480.

At the 1992 general election, Gale was again re-elected with a decreased vote share of 57.2% and an increased majority of 18,210. Following the election, he was appointed as the Parliamentary Private Secretary to the ministers of state at the Ministry of Defence Archie Hamilton and Jeremy Hanley until 1994.

Gale was again re-elected at the 1997 general election, with a decreased vote share of 44.1% and a decreased majority of 2,766. He was again re-elected at the 2001 general election, with an increased vote share of 50.3% and an increased majority of 6,650.

He was a vice chairman of the Conservative Party under the leadership of Iain Duncan Smith from 2001 to 2003 with responsibility for presentation.

Gale was again re-elected at the 2005 general election, with a decreased vote share of 49.6% and an increased majority of 7,634.

In July 2008, Gale said that capital punishment was a solution to fatal knife stabbings.

At the 2010 general election, Gale was again re-elected, with an increased vote share of 52.7% and an increased majority of 13,528.

Gale strongly opposed Conservative prime minister David Cameron's introduction of same-sex marriage, stating in the House of Commons: "Marriage is the union between a man and a woman. It is Alice in Wonderland territory, Orwellian almost, for any government of any political persuasion to seek to come along and try to rewrite the lexicon. It will not do".

At the 2015 general election, Gale was again re-elected, with a decreased vote share of 49% and a decreased majority of 10,948.

Gale was opposed to Brexit prior to the 2016 EU membership referendum.

At the snap 2017 general election, Gale was again re-elected, with an increased vote share of 56.2% and a decreased majority of 10,738. Gale was again re-elected at the 2019 general election, with an increased vote share of 62.4% and an increased majority of 17,189.

On 15 September 2020 he was one of two Conservative MPs (together with Andrew Percy) who voted against the UK Internal Market Bill at second reading.

In July 2021, Gale was one of five Conservative MPs found by the Commons Select Committee on Standards to have breached the code of conduct by trying to influence a judge in the trial of former Conservative MP Charlie Elphicke, who was eventually found guilty of three counts of sexual assault and sentenced to two years in prison. Gale was one of three of the group who was also recommended for a one-day suspension by the committee.

On 17 December 2021, following the North Shropshire by-election (when a Conservative majority of nearly 23,000 was overturned leading to a Liberal Democrat win), Gale said, "One more strike and he's (Boris Johnson) out." Gale said that the by-election "has to be seen as a referendum on the prime minister's performance". He later revealed he had submitted a letter of no-confidence in Johnson's leadership to the 1922 Committee.

In the wake of the 2022 Russian invasion of Ukraine, Gale called for all Russian nationals living in the UK to be forcibly deported, conceding that some "good and honest" people would be forced to leave. Gale said he had changed his mind on challenging Johnson's leadership following the invasion. He said, "we should not seek to destabilise the government of the United Kingdom". Gale also expressed his "fear" about a leadership election.

In December 2022 Gale was appointed as temporary Deputy Speaker of the House of Commons in order to cover for the illness of a colleague, Eleanor Laing.

Due to the 2023 Periodic Review of Westminster constituencies, Gale's constituency of North Thanet was abolished, and replaced with Herne Bay and Sandwich. At the 2024 general election, Gale was elected to Parliament as MP for Herne Bay and Sandwich with 35.3% of the vote and a majority of 2,499.

== Honours and awards ==
Gale was knighted in the 2012 New Year Honours for public and political services.

In February 2016, Gale was nominated for a "Grassroots Diplomat" award for his involvement in the campaign to save and reopen Manston Airport, which is in his constituency.

== Personal life ==
Gale has been married three times: firstly to Wendy Bowman in 1964 (marriage dissolved in 1967), secondly to Susan Linda Sampson in 1971 (marriage dissolved in 1980), with whom he has a daughter; thirdly to Susan Gabrielle Marks, with whom he has two sons.

Parliament of the United Kingdom
Constituency established	Member of Parliament for North Thanet; 1983–2024	Constituency abolished
Constituency established	Member of Parliament for Herne Bay and Sandwich; 2024–present	Incumbent
Honorary titles
Preceded by Sir Bill Cash	Oldest sitting Member of Parliament; 2024–present	Incumbent
