= Bowman baronets of Holmbury St Mary =

Escutcheon of the Bowman baronets of Holmbury St Mary

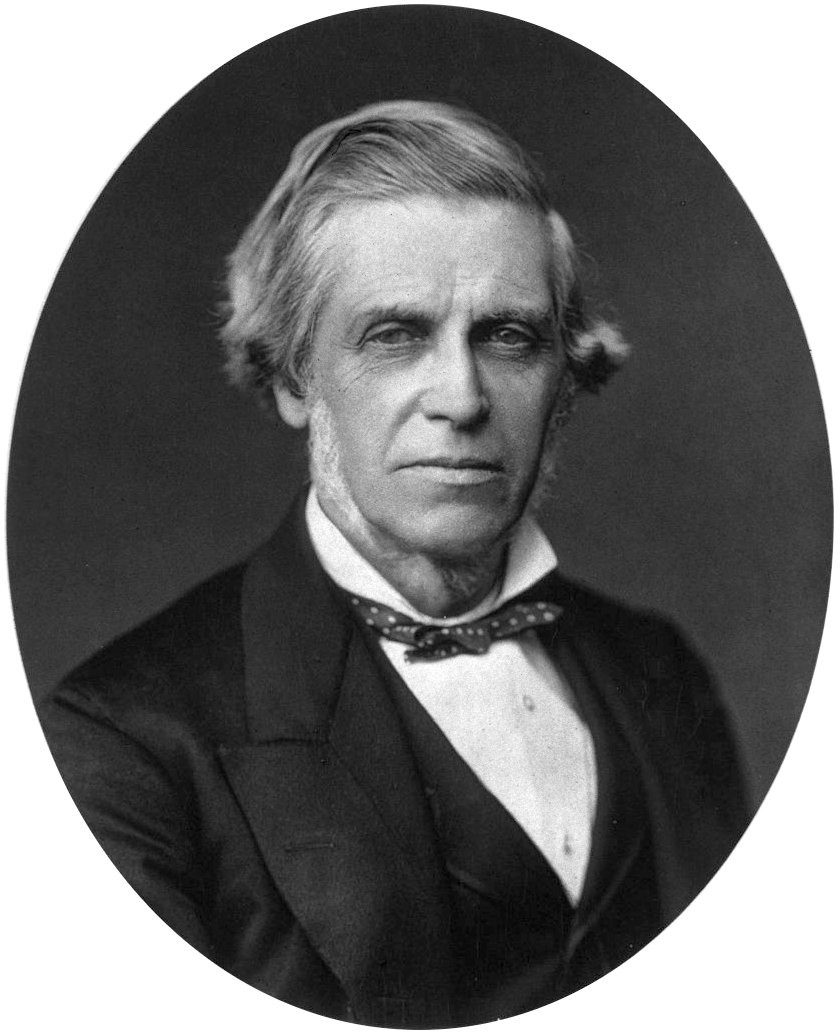
Sir William Bowman, 1st Baronet

The Bowman baronetcy, of Clifford Street in the parish of St James, Westminster, in the County of Middlesex and of Joldwynds in the parish of Holmbury St Mary in the County of Surrey, was created in the Baronetage of the United Kingdom on 23 January 1884 for the prominent surgeon, histologist and anatomist William Bowman.

He was succeeded by his eldest son the 2nd Baronet, a barrister, who assumed by Royal licence the additional surname of Paget, which was that of his maternal grandfather (however, none of the subsequent holders used this surname). His eldest son, the 3rd Baronet, was a clergyman and served as Rector of Shere, Surrey, and as Rural Dean for Cranleigh, Surrey. His line of the family failed on the death of his only son, the 4th Baronet, who died without surviving male issue in 1994.

He was succeeded by his second cousin, the 5th Baronet, son of Humphrey Ernest Bowman, and grandson of John Frederick Bowman, second son of the 1st Baronet. On his death in 2003 the title became extinct.

== Bowman baronets, of Holmbury St Mary (1884) ==
- Sir William Bowman, 1st Baronet (1816–1892)
- Sir William Paget Bowman, 2nd Baronet (1845–1917)
- Sir Paget Mervyn Bowman, 3rd Baronet (1873–1955)
- Sir John Paget Bowman, 4th Baronet (1904–1994)
- Sir Paul Humphrey Armytage Bowman, 5th Baronet (1921–2003)

== Note ==
Baronetage of the United Kingdom
Preceded by Lister baronets	Bowman baronets of Holmbury St Mary; 23 January 1884	Succeeded by Samuelson baronets
