= Judith Bowman =

American businesswoman

- Occupation(s): Author, syndicated journalist

Judith Bowman is an American businesswoman, author, syndicated journalist, and nonprofit executive. She is the founder of the National Civility Foundation. She writes a column for the Boston Herald called the "Business Protocol." Her book Don't Take the Last Donut was reviewed by Time Magazine's former journalist Lisa Cullen, who said, "this book offers the confident opinion of someone who’s clearly thought a lot about appropriate behavior in the workplace."

== Bibliography ==
- Bowman, Judith. Don't Take the Last Donut: New Rules of Business Etiquette, 2007.
- Bowman, Judith. How to Stand Apart @ Work: Transforming Fine to Fabulous, 2013.
