= The Ascent of Rum Doodle =

1956 book by William Ernest Bowman

- Cover of the 1956, first edition
- Author: W. E. Bowman
- Language: English
- Genre: Comedy novel
- Publisher: Max Parrish and Co. Ltd.
- Publication date: 1956
- Publication place: United Kingdom
- Media type: Print (Hardback)
- Pages: 141
- ISBN: 0-7126-6808-X
- OCLC: 316104236
- Followed by: The Cruise of the Talking Fish

The Ascent of Rum Doodle is a short 1956 novel by W. E. Bowman (1911–1985). It is a parody of the non-fictional chronicles of mountaineering expeditions (notably H. W. Tilman's account of the ascent of Nanda Devi and Maurice Herzog's book Annapurna chronicling the first ascent of Annapurna in Nepal) that were popular during the 1950s, as many of the world's highest peaks were climbed for the first time. A new edition was released in 2001 with an introduction by the contemporary humorist Bill Bryson. It has been critically well received. Though a parody, it has become one of the most famous and celebrated books of mountaineering literature.

The book has been republished several times since 1956. The current edition is published by Pimlico, an imprint of Random House. In January 2009, The Guardian included it in the '1000 Novels Everyone Must Read'.

== Synopsis ==
The narrator, "Binder" (his radio codename), is asked by the "Rum Doodle Committee" and its chairman, "Sir Hugeley Havering", to lead an expedition to climb "Rum Doodle", the highest mountain in the world (with an elevation of 40,000 and 1/2 feet), in the remote (fictional) country of "Yogistan". He assembles a team of climbers to play all the roles seen in the parodied literature:

- Burley, the "strong man";
- Constant, the "linguist";
- Jungle, the "route finder";
- Prone, the "physician";
- Shute, the "photographer";
- Wish, the "scientist."

It rapidly develops that each of the climbers is utterly inept in his nominal field of competence, as they demonstrate in a series of chaotic adventures en route to Yogistan; for example, Prone endures a never-ending series of illnesses, while Constant mispronounces a Yogistani word (the language hinges on variously "pronounced" belches and gastrointestinal rumbles) and offends a "short but powerful" Yogistani wielding a knife, having informed him that he lusted for the man's wife — not his intention at all. Binder handles these mishaps with typically British aplomb, having been reassured by the expedition's sponsor that "to climb Mont Blanc by the Grépon route is one thing; to climb Rum Doodle is, as Totter once said, quite another."

Somehow the group does make it to Yogistan, where they hire Yogistani porters, parodies of the Sherpas who were the indispensable indigenous porters and mountain guides (and sometimes climbing partners) to many of the great mountaineering expeditions. However, the Yogistanis do not share the invariable positive attributes of the Sherpa — quite the contrary. Hijinks ensue, as the expedition cook, "Pong", produces food so inedible that the expedition tries (unsuccessfully) to continue on up the mountain without him; the inevitable fall into a crevasse leads to the consumption of the party's champagne (brought along to celebrate reaching the summit and for "medicinal purposes") during the rescue attempt; and scientist Wish embarks on a never-ending quest for "Wharton's warple", an endangered species indigenous to the mountains. Eventually, Binder and a colleague manage to stumble to the top of the lofty spire the group has been approaching ... only to find that they have climbed the wrong mountain (and to see the porters, with Prone in tow, climbing the right one).

Binder, the narrator, returns in a 1957 sequel, The Cruise of the Talking Fish, a satire of the 1947 Kon-Tiki expedition.

== As inspiration ==
A bar and restaurant in Kathmandu, called Rum Doodle and decorated with pictures from the book, has become a popular staging point for expeditions to Mount Everest, and which gives free dinners to those who successfully climb it. There is a popular B&B in Windermere, Cumbria, named after the book, with each room named after one of the characters.

A small mountain in the Masson Range in Antarctica, near Mawson Station, bears the official name Rumdoodle Peak inspired by this book. A mountainous point in Aoraki / Mount Cook National Park in New Zealand is known as Rumdoodle. The northeast ridge of Pikes Peak, in Colorado, United States, has been unofficially nicknamed Rumdoodle Ridge by local climbers. There is a hidden couloir in the Vanoise National Park in the French Alps, also unofficially known as the Rum Doodle, and named by one of the firsts to discover and ski down it, Will Eaton. It is so called as it took a long time to find the entrance, and skiing down it wasn't without complications.

The number "153" that appears numerous times in the book is the number of the house on Borough Road, Middlesbrough where the Bowman family moved shortly after Bowman's birth in 1911.

== Reception ==
Floyd C. Gale of Galaxy Science Fiction praised Rum Doodle: "If this misAdventure book doesn't make you forget your cares, see your doctor at once! It's laughter than you think!"

Comedian Tim Key described the book as the funniest book he'd ever read: Laugh-out-loud literature.
