= Bowman baronets of Killingworth =

The Bowman baronetcy, of Killingworth in the County of Northumberland, was created in the Baronetage of the United Kingdom on 18 January 1961 for the trade unionist and industrial administrator Sir James Bowman, KBE, Chairman of the National Coal Board in 1956. The title became extinct on the death of his son, the 2nd Baronet, in 1990.

== Bowman baronets, of Killingworth (1961) ==
- Sir James Bowman, 1st Baronet (1898–1978)
- Sir George Bowman, 2nd Baronet (1923–1990), left no heir.
