= Valerie Bowman =

American novelist

Valerie Bowman is an author of historical romance novels, specifically Regency romance as well as contemporary romance novels.

Bowman's first book, Secrets of a Wedding Night, was nominated for a Best First Historical Romance Award from RT Book Reviews. The Unexpected Duchess, the first book in Bowman's Playful Brides series, received a starred review from Kirkus Reviews.

In 2014 Bowman appeared in Season 6 of the reality television show Say Yes to the Dress: Atlanta.

== Books ==
=== Secret Brides series ===
1. Secrets of a Wedding Night, St. Martin's Press, 2012
2. Secrets of a Runaway Bride, St. Martin's Press, 2013
3. Secrets of a Scandalous Marriage, St. Martin's Press, 2013

==== Secret Brides stories and novellas ====
1. A Secret Proposal, St. Martin's Press, 2013
2. A Secret Affair, St. Martin's Press, 2013
3. It Happened Under The Mistletoe, St. Martin's Press, 2013

=== Playful Brides series ===
1. The Unexpected Duchess, St. Martin's Press, 2014
2. The Accidental Countess, St. Martin's Press, 2014
3. The Unlikely Lady, St. Martin's Press, 2015
4. The Irresistible Rogue, St. Martin's Press, 2015
5. The Unforgettable Hero, St. Martin's Press, 2016 (novella)
6. The Untamed Earl, St. Martin's Press, 2016
7. The Legendary Lord, St. Martin's Press, 2016
8. Never Trust a Pirate, St. Martin's Press, 2017
9. The Right Kind of Rogue, St. Martin's Press, 2017
10. A Duke Like No Other, St. Martin's Press, 2018
11. Kiss Me at Christmas, St. Martin's Press, 2018
12. No Other Duke But You, St. Martin's Press, 2019

=== Other works ===
- Painless Marketing for Busy Authors, self-published, 2013
