= Humphrey Bowman =

British civil servant (1879–1965)

Humphrey Ernest Bowman (26 July 1879 – 23 March 1965) worked in the Education Departments in the British Protectorates in Egypt from 1903 to 1911 and Sudan from 1911 to 1913. He served in the British Army from 1914 to 1918. He became Director of Education in Mesopotamia in August 1918, and left in August 1920 to return to Egypt. Subsequently he became Director of Education in Palestine. He published a memoir of his career entitled, Middle-East Window, in 1942.
