= Symphony song =

The English symphony song was a musical genre of baroque music best known in the compositions of Henry Purcell and his contemporaries including his teacher John Blow. In the symphony song voices and continuo were enriched with ritornelli for violins or a pair of recorders. Among the earliest symphony songs are four published by Oxford composer Henry Bowman in 1677. John Blow's most notable early example is "Awake, awake my lyre". The symphony song was a genre mainly linked to the Restoration royal court, just as the symphony anthem was linked to the English Chapel Royal. Purcell's symphony songs were probably written for performance by members of the Private Music in the royal apartments.

Examples of symphony songs include the symphony anthems of Pelham Humfrey, and eight extant works by Purcell including "How pleasant is this flowery plain", "Go Perjured Man" and "If Ever I more Riches did Desire."

== Recordings ==
- Henry Purcell Hark how the wild musicians sing - The Symphony Songs of Henry Purcell Red Byrd, The Parley of Instruments, Peter Holman. Hyperion.
