= Dorla Bowman =

Belizean human rights activist (born c. 1952)

- Born: 1952 (age 73–74); Belize City, Belize
- Occupation: Human rights activist

Dorla Bowman (born c. 1952) is a Belizean human rights activist. She has campaigned for women's rights and gender equality in Belize, in addition to advocating for the support, practically and legally, for people who have experienced domestic abuse.

== Biography ==
Bowman was born and raised in Belize City. In 1982, she replaced Zee Edgell as the director of the Women's Bureau, a United Nations-funded government service within the Ministry of Social Services aimed at improving the outcomes for Belizean women. She also served for a time as a member of Belize City Council.

Later in the 1980s, Bowman left the Belizean government and created and served as the director of the non-governmental organisation Women Against Violence (WAV). Bowman was inspired to establish WAV following a series of public meetings held in King's Park, an affluent area of Belize City, in which concerns were shared about a "violence epidemic" in poorer areas of the city. Through WAV, Bowman supported the drafting of various legislative proposals, including a Sexual Offences Bill in 1988 and a Sexual Harassment Act in the early 1990s. Between 1991 and 1992, Bowman and WAV lobbied for the Domestic Violence Act, which had been drafted by Lisa Shoman and Dolores Balderamos-García. The Domestic Violence Act was eventually passed in 1992 with unanimous government support.

Bowman also founded the Belize Women's Political Caucus to increase the election of women to positions of national decision and policy making. In 1999, Bowman wrote an article for The Reporter in which she stated that Belize was "not a democracy" because there was no gender balance in the government, noting that, at that time, the House of Representatives comprised 27 men and two women, while the Cabinet had 15 men and one woman.

In the 21st century, Bowman created and served as the executive director of the Building People Movement which aimed to increase public awareness of sexual assault laws in Belize, in addition to supporting victims of gender-based violence to access equal opportunities. In 2020, Bowman co-authored Woman! Know Your Rights!, a book that aimed to educate Belizean people about domestic violence laws through a play. In June 2024, the Building People Movement hosted a forum at the University of the West Indies in Belize City on domestic abuse support, supported by the US embassy and the Ministry of Health and Wellness.

== Recognition ==
In 2022, Bowman was named the 222nd Commonwealth Point of Light for her work on human rights and gender-based violence. The award was presented to her by Claire Evans, the high commissioner in Belize, on behalf of Elizabeth II.

In 2025, Bowman was among 14 Belizean women recognised at the 20th Annual Outstanding Women's Award Ceremony held by the National Women's Commission, in the field of human rights and violence against women.
