= Clifford Bowman =

British flying ace (1899–1978)

- Born: 26 March 1899; Thornton, Lancashire, England
- Died: 31 October 1978 (aged 79)
- Military career
- Allegiance: England
- Branch: Aviation
- Rank: Captain
- Unit: No. 49 Squadron RAF
- Awards: Distinguished Flying Cross

Captain Clifford Bowman DFC (26 March 1899 – 31 October 1978) was a British World War I flying ace credited with six aerial victories.
