= Jan Bouwman =

Dutch swimmer

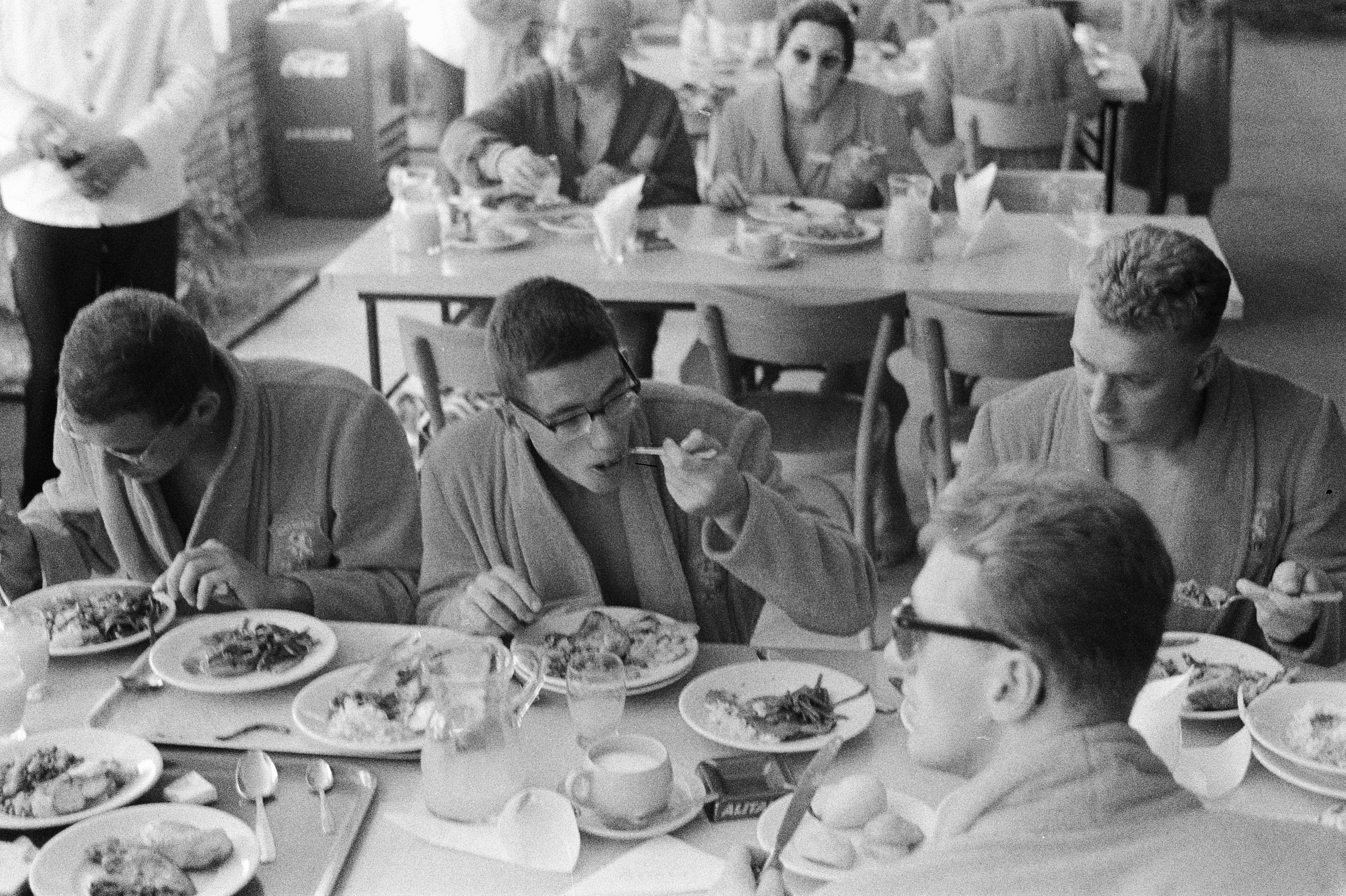
- Dutch swimmers at the 1960 Olympics, Bouwman is bottom-right

Personal information
- Born: 27 November 1935 Heemstede, the Netherlands
- Died: 18 December 1999 (aged 64) Noordwijk, the Netherlands
- Height: 1.96 m (6 ft 5 in)
- Weight: 92 kg (203 lb)

Sport
- Sport: Swimming
- Club: HPC, Heemstede

Jan Bouwman (27 November 1935 – 18 December 1999) was a Dutch swimmer. He competed at the 1960 Summer Olympics in the 100 m freestyle, but failed to reach the final.
