= Kimiko O. Bowman =

Japanese-American statistician (1927–2019)

Dr. Kimiko Osada Bowman
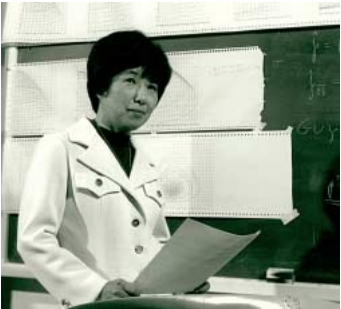
- Born: August 15, 1927; Japan
- Died: January 13, 2019 (aged 91)
- Education: Radford College; Virginia Tech
- Children: 1
- Scientific career
- Fields: Statistics
- Institutions: Oak Ridge National Laboratory; Office of Naval Research
- Thesis: Moments to Higher Orders for Maximum Likelihood Estimates with an Application to the Negative Binomial Distribution
- Doctoral advisor: Leonard Shenton

Kimiko Osada Bowman (August 15, 1927 – 13 January 2019) was a Japanese-American statistician known for her work on approximating the probability distribution of maximum likelihood estimators and for her advocacy for people with disabilities.

== Life ==
Kimiko Osada was born in Japan in 1927 before emigrating to the United States in 1951. She became a U.S. citizen in 1958.

She contracted polio while young, and became paralyzed from the neck down, but learned to walk again through years of physical therapy.

She began her undergraduate studies in home economics at Radford College, but was persuaded by the college president to become a scientist. She studied both mathematics and chemistry and completed a B.S.Ed. in mathematics in 1960. She earned a Ph.D. in mathematical statistics from Virginia Tech in 1963; her dissertation, advised by Leonard Shenton, was Moments to Higher Orders for Maximum Likelihood Estimates with an Application to the Negative Binomial Distribution.

As a senior research scientist at the Oak Ridge National Laboratory, Bowman worked on the distributional properties of estimators based on non-normal data. Bowman also frequently visited Japan in association with the U.S. Office of Naval Research. After 45 years of service, she retired in 1994.

Bowman served on the National Science Foundation Equal Opportunities for Science and Engineering advisory committee, and chaired the NSF Committee on People with Disabilities. She also chaired the Statistical Tracking of Employment of People with Disabilities Task Force for the President’s Committee on Employment of People with Disabilities.

== Awards and honors ==
Bowman became a Fellow of the American Statistical Association in 1976. She was also a fellow of the American Association for the Advancement of Science and the Institute of Mathematical Statistics, and an elected member of the International Statistical Institute.

In 1987, she was given an honorary doctorate by the University of Tokyo, becoming the first foreigner to be so honored.
