= Kelley Bowman =

American high jumper (born 1983)

Kelley Bowman (born March 26, 1983, in Richmond, Kentucky) is an NCAA All American high jumper for the University of Louisville. The Rockcastle County native finished third at the 2006 NCAA Outdoor Championships with a jump of 1.86 meters or 6 feet 1¼ inches, breaking the University of Louisville school record. She is only the second University of Louisville female Track and Field athlete to ever be named an All American.

Bowman is widely considered the best female high jumper to ever come out of the state of Kentucky. While attending Berea Community High School, she set the all-time Kentucky High School girls high jump record of 5 feet, 10 inches as a junior and won all four state high jump championships she participated in. Her 5' 10" jump was the 4th best in the entire nation in 2000.
