= Kristin Bowman-James =

American chemist

- Born: Kristin Susan Bowman
- Education: Temple University
- Scientific career
- Workplaces: Ohio State University; University of Kansas
- Thesis: I. Azido complexes of nickel (II), palladium (II), and platinum (II). II. Iron (II) complexes as models for myoglobin (1974)

Kristin Susan Bowman-James is an American chemist who is a distinguished professor at the University of Kansas. Her research makes use of host–guest chemistry to design new molecules for biology and the environment. She was awarded the 2021 American Chemical Society Award in Inorganic Chemistry.

== Early life and education ==
Bowman-James is from Philadelphia. She earned her bachelor's and doctoral degree at Temple University. Whist she was originally considering majoring in astronomy, her freshman advisor recommended she tried a class in chemistry, and Bowman-James was instantly inspired. Her doctoral research considers azado complexes as models for myoglobin. She spent a year as a postdoctoral fellow at the Ohio State University, where she worked with Daryle H. Busch.

== Research and career ==
In 1975, Bowman-James joined the faculty at the University of Kansas. Bowman-James is interested in host–guest chemistry for the design of supramolecular assemblies and ions that are relevant for biology and environmental science. This chemistry allows the design of molecules that can capture two guests: chemical mustards and negatively charged ions (anions).

Chemical mustards can be used as chemical blistering agents or in chemotherapy. Bowman-James has designed molecules that can bind to and neutralise the toxicity of mustard gas, allowing for it to be identified and decommissioned. She has made use of the concepts of transition metal coordination chemistry to coordinate anions. Bowman-James was the first to recognise that anions and transition metals had many similarities. She makes use of the anions for environmental applications, including selective sensing, separation and catalysis. Her early work considered polyammonium macrocycles as enzyme mimics, whilst her later research evaluated the structural motifs of halides and oxoanions.

In 1997, Bowman-James co-edited the first book on anion chemistry, Supramolecular Chemistry of Anions, published by Wiley. She published the sequel, Anion Coordination Chemistry, in 2011.

From 1995 to 2001, Bowman-James served as chair of the faculty of chemistry at the University of Kansas. She was made a University Distinguished Professor in 2007. She led the National Science Foundation Program to Stimulate Competitive Research. In 2021, she became the second woman to win the American Chemical Society Award in Inorganic Chemistry.

== Awards and honors ==
- 2002 American Chemical Society Women Chemists Committee Award for Diversity
- 2003 American Chemical Society Midwest Award Winner
- 2010 Elected Fellow of the American Chemical Society
- 2011 University of Kansas Leading Light Award
- 2021 American Chemical Society Award in Inorganic Chemistry

== Selected publications ==
- Kristin Bowman-James (2005). "Alfred Werner revisited: the coordination chemistry of anions". Accounts of Chemical Research. 38 (8): 671–678. doi:10.1021/ar040071t. PMID 16104690. Wikidata Q34443597.
- Sung Ok Kang; Rowshan Ara Begum; Kristin Bowman-James (2006). "Amide-based ligands for anion coordination". Angewandte Chemie International Edition. 45 (47): 7882–7894. doi:10.1002/anie.200602006. PMID 17072919. Wikidata Q79315081.
- Sung Ok Kang; José M. Llinares; Victor W. Day; Kristin Bowman-James (2010). "Cryptand-like anion receptors". Chemical Society Reviews. 39 (10): 3980–4003. doi:10.1039/c0cs00083c. PMID 20820597. Wikidata Q37785770.

=== Books ===
- Supramolecular chemistry of anions. Antonio Bianchi, Kristin Bowman-James, Enrique García-España. New York: Wiley-VCH. 1997. ISBN 0-471-18622-8. OCLC 36430692.
- Anion coordination chemistry. Kristin Bowman-James, Antonio Bianchi, Enrique García-España. Weinheim: Wiley-VCH. 2012. ISBN 978-3-527-63950-2. OCLC 768230384.

== Personal life ==
Outside of science, Bowman-James is interested in fast cars. She owns a 1975 Corvette and a 2010 Corvette Grand Sport.
