= Jane Bowman =

American singer

Jane Bowman was an American singer. Her 1961 rockabilly tough gal song, "Mad Mama", concerned an overly jealous mate. Bowman wrote "Mad Mama".

== Discography ==
- "Dearest Little Angel", B-side "Coming Down With The Blues" (June 1961)
- "Eternally", B-side "Mad Mama" (November 1961)
