= Wendy Bowman =

British actor (born 1945)

- Born: 1945 (age 80–81); Sunderland, England

Wendy Bowman (born 1945) is a British actor, singer, dancer and television announcer best known for appearances in 1960s TV shows such as Emergency Ward 10, Sergeant Cork and Compact.

== Early life ==
Bowman was born in Sunderland in 1945 and followed in the footsteps of her dancing school teacher mother, Mattie Bowman, to make a career on the stage. After attending Grange Crescent School in Sunderland, she studied at Guildhall School of Music and Drama in London in 1960. Her professional debut was at Sunderland Empire Theatre in 1961, when she played the part of the princess in the pantomime Humpty Dumpty at the age of 16. A caricature of her in the show is held in the archives of the Victoria and Albert Museum in London.

== Career ==
Bowman understudied West End musical star Paula Hendrix in The Boys from Syracuse at the Theatre Royal, Drury Lane in 1963, and replaced her for one performance. In 1966 she played Eliza Doolittle in the H. M. Tennant touring production of My Fair Lady, opposite Tony Britton as Henry Higgins, winning favorable reviews. Bowman also starred in theatrical shows with several comedians such as Terry Scott and Jimmy Logan during the 1960s, as well as matinee idol John Hanson.

Bowman returned to the Sunderland Empire in 1968 with the Ivor Novello touring show The Dancing Years and in 1969 she starred as Cinderella in the Christmas pantomime at Newcastle Theatre Royal. She was to reprise the role of Cinderella at the Alhambra Theatre, Bradford, in 1971. In 1972 she returned, once again, to the Sunderland Empire, where she starred for the first time as principal boy in the pantomime Dick Whittington. In 1977 she was an understudy in the musical Something's Afoot and, in 1981, she appeared as Frau Zeller and as a member of the ensemble in the West End revival of The Sound of Music.

Although Bowman spent much of her career on the stage, she also found fame in TV shows such as Emergency Ward 10, Sergeant Cork and Compact too. Her voice was also used for non-singing stars in the film of the musical Oliver!, she made cast recordings of both The Sound of Music and The Boys from Syracuse and appeared as a television announcer in the 1960s.

== Personal life ==
Bowman married future MP Roger Gale in 1964, but the marriage was dissolved in 1967. Soon afterwards, she married Peter Davis, and had a son, Justin, in 1970.

As of 2016 Bowman was living in the West Sussex area and performing in local concerts.
