= Judy Bowman =

American collage artist (born 1952)

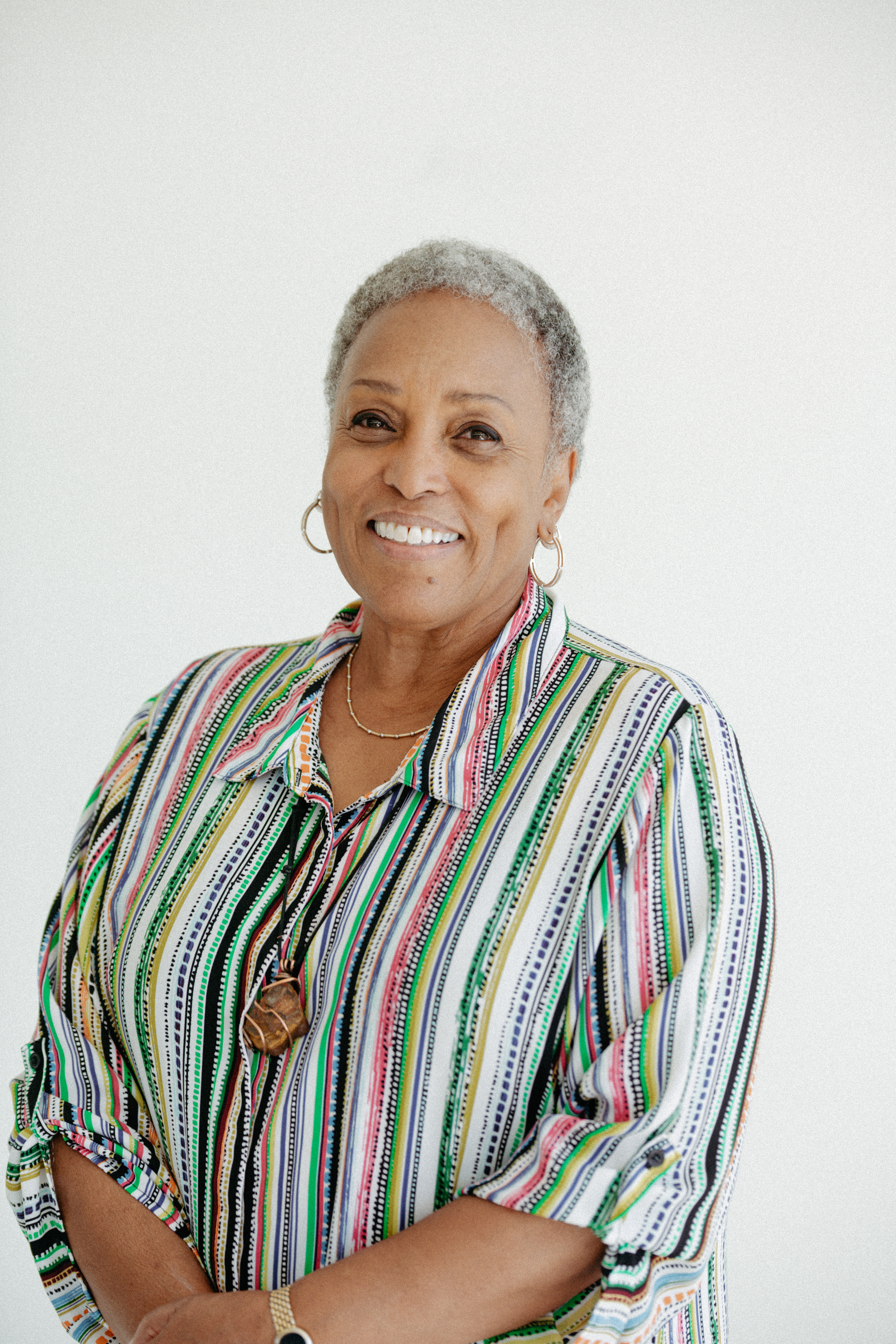
- Bowman at the Butter Art Fair + Black Lunch Table's Photo Booth in 2025
- Born: 1952 (age 73–74); Detroit, Michigan
- Education: University of Michigan-Flint
- Website: https://www.judybowman.com/

Judy Bowman (b. 1952) is an American collage artist and educator based in Detroit, Michigan. She is a member of the Detroit Fine Arts Breakfast Club and has participated in Art Basel Miami. Working primarily in collage, Bowman utilizes Lokta paper to create portraits celebrating the Black experience. Her work is in the permanent collections of the Detroit Institute of Arts, the Detroit Historical Museum, Georgetown University Library, and the Flint Institute of Arts.

== Early life and education ==
Bowman was born and raised in Detroit's historic Black Bottom neighborhood, which was demolished the late 1950s to make room for the Chrysler Freeway. She attended Clark Atlanta University for three years before she had the first of her ten children. At Clark Atlanta University, Bowman studied art while working primarily in pastels and even got commissioned to create work for Coretta Scott King and Alberta King. After getting married and having her first child, Bowman's career in art was put on hold.

After her family and her relocated from Atlanta to Michigan, Bowman went to the University of Michigan-Flint in the hopes of finishing her art degree. Due to the university's lack of an art department, Bowman chose to pivot to an education degree.

== Career ==
Bowman began her career post graduation as an art teacher working in both Flint and Battle Creek. She retired in the position of principal of the Detroit Academy of Arts and Sciences after working in education for 27 years.

At the age of seventy, Bowman had her first solo museum exhibition. The show was titled "Gratiot Griot" and was held at the Museum of Contemporary Art Detroit (MOCAD) from October 29th, 2022 to March 26, 2023. The exhibition included collage works by Bowman meant to celebrate Black culture while acting as a tribute to the Black Bottom neighborhood community in which Bowman was raised.

In 2024, one of Bowman's collage works was featured on the program cover for the University of Michigan's production of "When the Caged Bird Sings" by composer Nkeiru Okoye.

From February 2, 2025 to April 19, 2025, the Flint Institute of Arts held the exhibition "We Loved the Swag: From Black Bottom Until Now" which featured a collection of Bowman's collage art. The focus of this show was on Bowman's experience growing up in Detroit's Black Bottom neighborhood and how the Black community utilized style during the era of the neighborhood's destruction in the 1960s.

== Awards and fellowships ==
- Kresge Artist Fellowship 2021
- Alain Locke Recognition Art Award 2022
