= Matthew Bowman =

English footballer (born 1990)

Personal information
- Full name: Matthew Bowman
- Date of birth: 31 January 1990 (age 36)
- Place of birth: Barnsley, England
- Position: Striker

Youth career
- 2005–2006: Sheffield Wednesday

Senior career*
Years	Team	Apps	(Gls)
2006–2007	Sheffield Wednesday	0	(0)
- * Club domestic league appearances and goals as of 22:15, 16 March 2008 (UTC)

Matthew Bowman (born 31 January 1990) is an English footballer who played once for Sheffield Wednesday. Although an academy player, he was called up to the senior squad at the start of 2006–07 season to ease the club's injury problems. Matt made good progress in the under-18s and reserves before earning his first-team debut at Hillsborough against Wrexham in the League Cup in August 2006, where at the age of 16 years and 205 days, he became the youngest outfield player ever to appear for Wednesday. He was released by the club at the end of the season, however.
