= Aisling Byrne-Bowman =

Irish sailor (born 1967)

Personal information
- Nationality: Irish
- Born: 26 August 1967 (age 58) Dublin, Ireland
- Height: 172 cm (5 ft 8 in)
- Weight: 58 kg (128 lb)

Sport

Sailing career
- Class(es): 470, Europe
- Club: National Yacht Club

Aisling Byrne-Bowman (born 26 August 1967) is an Irish sailor. She competed at the 1988 Summer Olympics and the 1996 Summer Olympics.
