= Joe Bowman (marksman) =

American bootmaker and marksman (1925–2009)

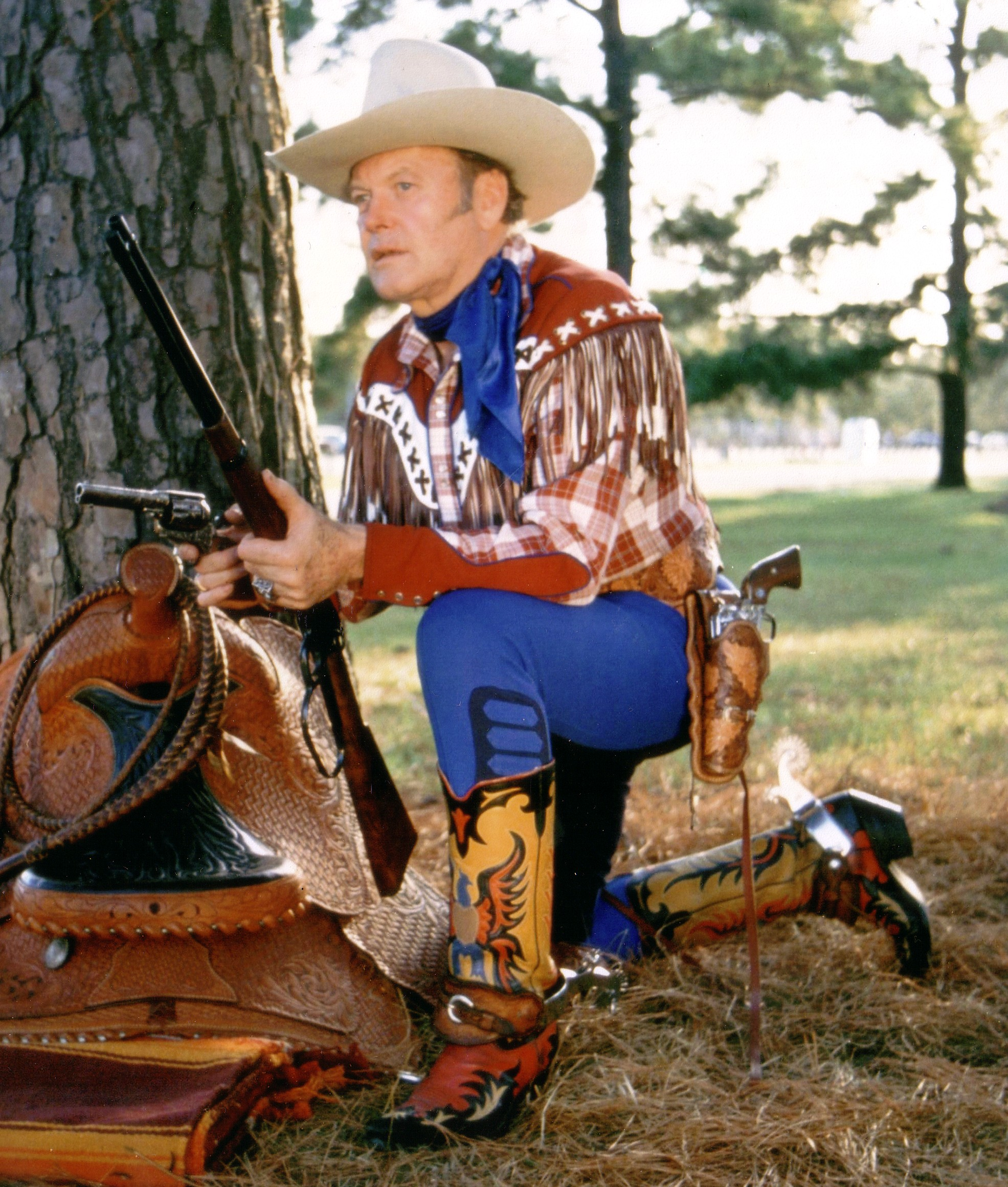
- Celebrated sharpshooter, Hollywood consultant, firearms instructor, historian, and Old West artisan
- Born: April 12, 1925; Johnson City, Tennessee, US
- Died: June 29, 2009 (aged 84); Junction, Texas, US
- Other names: The Straight Shooter; The Master of Triggernometry
- Occupations: Bootmaker, marksman, and Western entertainer
- Spouse(s): Betty (Fruge) Bowman (1954–1968, divorced); Betty Reid-Bowman (c.1992–2009, his death)
- Children: 2
- Website: www.joebowman.net

Joseph Lee Bowman (April 12, 1925 – June 29, 2009) was an American marksman called "The Straight Shooter", considered to have been a guardian of Texas and Western frontier culture. He was also an Eagle Scout, Army soldier, and bootmaker.

== Biography ==
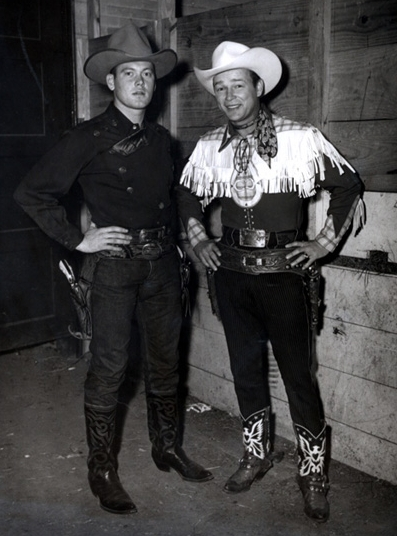
Bowman (left) with Roy Rogers

Bowman was born in Johnson City, Tennessee, and grew up in Asheville, North Carolina. He began developing firearm skills at a young age, using BB guns. When he was 12 years old, his family moved to Houston, where he became an Eagle Scout and went on to graduate from Sam Houston High School in 1943.

During World War II, Bowman served in the Army and saw action in France; he received three Bronze Star Medals and a Purple Heart. After the war, he attended the University of Houston for two years, before opening his own boot store in Houston.

After selling his store in the 1960s, Bowman became a salesman and began performing as "The Straight Shooter" in his spare time. His gun tricks included being able to shoot an aspirin tablet at 30 paces, and being able to split a playing card edge-wise at 20 paces. The guns he used included a pair of Ruger Blackhawk revolvers. He went on to teach gun handling to Hollywood stars such as Robert Duvall and James Arness, and was a firearms instructor with law enforcement agencies, including the FBI.

Bowman died in June 2009, while en route to his home in Houston; he had stopped overnight in Junction, Texas, returning from a convention that he had performed at in Albuquerque, New Mexico. In July 2009, he was posthumously inducted into the Texas Heroes Hall of Honor at the Frontier Times Museum in Bandera. Bowman married twice, and had two children from his first marriage.
