= Joe Bowman (footballer) =

English footballer (1902–1941)

Personal information
- Full name: Joseph Bowman
- Date of birth: 7 November 1902
- Place of birth: Evenwood, County Durham, England
- Date of death: August 1941 (aged 38)
- Place of death: Chesterfield, England
- Position: Left back

Senior career*
Years	Team	Apps	(Gls)
1924−1932	Doncaster Rovers	182	(1)
1932−1936	Chesterfield	29	(0)
1936−	Broad Oaks Works		
- * Club domestic league appearances and goals

Joseph Bowman (7 November 1902 − August 1941) was an English footballer born in Evenwood, County Durham who played as a left back for Doncaster Rovers and Chesterfield. He played for Doncaster in the Third Division North between 1924 and 1932 and made 201 appearances in all competitions.

Bowman left to play for Chesterfield in League Division 2 in the 1931–32 season, making his debut at Tottenham Hotspur in a 3−3 draw on 13 February 1932. He appeared 31 times in total, playing his last first team game against Stoke City on 15 April 1933.

After Chesterfield, he moved into non-league football including playing for Broad Oaks Works. He died in 1941 at 38 years of age.
