= Paul Bowman (academic) =

British academic

Paul Bowman is a British academic specialising in cultural and media studies. He is a Professor of Cultural Studies and Deputy Head of the School of Journalism, Media and Culture at Cardiff University.

In the fields of cultural studies, film studies, media studies and postcolonial studies, he is author of Post-Marxism Versus Cultural Studies (Edinburgh University Press, 2007), Deconstructing Popular Culture (Palgrave, 2008), Theorizing Bruce Lee (Rodopi, 2009), Culture and the media (Palgrave Macmillan, 2012) Reading Rey Chow: Visuality, postcoloniality, ethnicity, sexuality (Peter Lang, 2013), and Beyond Bruce Lee: Chasing the dragon through film, philosophy and popular culture (Wallflower/Columbia University Press, 2013).

Since 2015, Bowman has devoted himself to developing research and publication in the new field of martial arts studies. His first monograph in this area was Martial arts studies: disrupting disciplinary boundaries (Rowman and Littlefield International, 2015). This was followed up by Mythologies of martial arts (Rowman & Littlefield International, 2016). Then the open access monograph, Deconstructing martial arts (Cardiff University Press, 2019) (10.18573/book1). Most recently, Bowman published The invention of martial arts: popular culture between Asia and America (Oxford University Press, 2021).

He is also editor of several books: Interrogating Cultural Studies (Pluto, 2003), The Truth of Žižek (Continuum, 2007), Reading Ranciere (Continuum 2010), The Rey Chow Reader (Columbia University Press, 2010) and The Martial Arts Studies Reader (Rowman & Littlefield International, 2018).

In addition to these books, Bowman has edited issues of the journals Parallax, Social Semiotics, Postcolonial Studies, Educational Philosophy and Theory, Global Media and China, and many issues of the journals he co-founded and co-edited, JOMEC Journal and Martial Arts Studies.

He has written over a dozen monographs, edited six further books, published 44 academic journal articles and 33 academic book chapters. He is also author of the non-academic book, The Treasures of Bruce Lee (Carlton, 2013).

His academia.edu site (https://cardiff.academia.edu/PaulBowman) is consistently in the top 1% most viewed profiles.

== Awards and honours ==
In 2014, Bowman was a visiting professor in the University of Ljubljana, Slovenia.

Although he does not practice this art, in 2015, Bowman was awarded an honorary blackbelt in taekkyon by Master Kim of the World Taekkyeon Headquarters in Seoul, South Korea.

In 2016, Bowman was awarded a tewhatewha (or general's staff) by Tamiaho Herangi-Searancke, who holds the role of Guardian, Protectorate and Master in Rituals to the New Zealand Maori King Tuheitia Paki. The tewhatewha was presented for services to the development of scholarly knowledge of martial arts and culture.

== Media Appearances ==
Bowman has been interviewed on multiple regional, national and international TV and radio programmes. He also features prominently in the 2012 documentary I Am Bruce Lee, appears in the BBC4 documentary series, Timeshift (in the episode 'Everybody was Kung Fu Fighting: The Rise of Martial Arts in Britain'), and on the BBC Radio 4 programme, In Living Memory (in the episode 'Kung Fu').

== The Martial Arts Studies Podcast ==
In 2020, Bowman established The Martial Arts Studies Podcast. At first, episodes were conversations with academics working in the field of martial arts studies. However, over the last few years, episodes have mainly been recordings of lectures and conference presentations, both those of Bowman himself and those of others working in the field. Episodes are podcast fortnightly in two formats: audio (on Podbean) and video, on The Martial Arts Studies YouTube Channel.

== Education ==
Bowman was educated at St. Mary's Comprehensive School in Newcastle (UK). He studied English at Leeds University, then an MA in Cultural Studies at Leeds, and then a PhD, also in Cultural Studies at Leeds. His PhD topic was 'Post-Marxist "Discourse" and the Theory/Practice Divide in Cultural Studies".

== Academic career ==
Bowman was Lecturer in Cultural Studies at Bath Spa University (2001-2003); Lecturer in Media and Cultural Studies at Roehampton University (2003-4); Senior Lecturer in Media and Cultural Studies at Roehampton University (2004-8); Lecturer in Media and Cultural Studies at Cardiff University (2008-10), Senior Lecturer in Media and Cultural Studies (2010-12), Reader in Media and Cultural Studies (2012-16), and Professor of Cultural Studies (2016-present). Since 2021, he has also been Deputy Head of the School of Journalism, Media and Culture, at Cardiff University.
