= Walter Bowman (antiquary) =

Scottish antiquary (died 1782)

Walter Bowman (died 1782) was a Scottish antiquary.

== Life ==
Bowman was a native of Scotland, and owned an estate at Logie in Fifeshire. He had been travelling tutor to the eldest son of Francis Seymour-Conway, 1st Marquess of Hertford, and was rewarded with the place of comptroller of the Port of Bristol. For many years he resided at East Molesey, Surrey, but latterly on his property at Egham, in the same county.

A traveller and collector, he had some celebrity in his day as a virtuoso and man of science, which gained him admission in 1735 to the Society of Antiquaries, and in 1742 to the Royal Society.

Bowman had withdrawn from both societies several years before his death, in February 1782. In his will (proved 16 March of that year) he left whimsical directions regarding the arrangement and preservation of his library at Logie.

== Works ==
To the Society of Antiquaries he contributed several papers, chiefly on classical antiquities, three of which were printed in vol. i. of Archæologia, pp. 100, 109, 112. His only published communication to the Royal Society was an eccentric letter addressed to Dr. Stephen Hales, on an earthquake felt at East Molesey 14 March 1749–50, which appeared in the Philosophical Transactions, xlvi. 684.
