= Jack Bowman =

American politician (1932–2022)

Member of the Tennessee House of Representatives from the Roane County district
- In office 1967–1976

Personal details
- Born: July 4, 1932 Kingston, Tennessee, U.S.
- Died: August 1, 2022 (aged 90) Harriman, Tennessee, U.S.
- Party: Republican
- Spouse: Miriam Morton
- Children: Miriam Bowman Tedder
- Education: Tennessee Technological University
- Occupation: Businessman, farmer

Benny Jack Bowman (July 4, 1932 – August 1, 2022) was an American politician from the state of Tennessee who served in the Tennessee House of Representatives from 1967 to 1976. A Republican, he represented Roane County, Tennessee. Residing in Harriman, Tennessee, he was a businessman and farmer. Bowman was of the Southern Baptist faith and was a life-long member of Caney Ford Baptist Church. He died on August 1, 2022, at the age of 90.
