= Richard Bowman (cricketer) =

English cricketer (1934–2005)

Richard Bowman (26 January 1934 – 24 March 2005) was an English cricketer active from 1955 to 1964 who played for Oxford University, Lancashire and Marylebone Cricket Club (MCC).

Bowman was born in Cleveleys and educated at Fettes College in Edinburgh. He appeared in 26 first-class matches as a righthanded batsman who bowled right arm fast. He scored 454 runs with a highest score of 75 and held 15 catches. He took 51 wickets with a best analysis of seven for 60.
