= David Bowman (footballer, born 1960) =

English footballer (born 1960)

Personal information
- Full name: David Michael Bowman
- Date of birth: 16 December 1960 (age 65)
- Place of birth: Scarborough, England
- Position: Striker

Senior career*
Years	Team	Apps	(Gls)
?–1979	Bridlington Town	?	(?)
1979–1988	Scarborough	128	(38)
- * Club domestic league appearances and goals

David Michael Bowman (born 16 December 1960) is an English former footballer.

He played for Bridlington Town and Scarborough.
