= Louise Morey Bowman =

Canadian poet (1882–1944)

Louise Morey Bowman (17 January 1882 – 28 September 1944) was a Canadian poet.

== Life ==
Lily Louise Dyer Morey was born in Sherbrooke, Quebec, 17 January 1882. She pursued her education with private tutors, then at Dana Hall School, and by extensive travel in Europe. Married in 1909 to Archibald Bowman, she lived in Toronto until 1919, when she moved to Montreal where she resided until her death in 1944.

== Writing career ==
Bowman's first published poem, "North Room", appeared in Outlook in May 1913 and she had quite an extensive magazine publication. Her work appeared in Poetry, Outlook, Independent, Dalhousie Review, Queen's Quarterly, and Canadian Magazine. She also published three books: Moonlight and Common Day (Toronto: Macmillan, 1922); Dream Tapestries (Toronto: Macmillan, 1924), which won a David Award from the Quebec Government; and Characters in Cadence (Toronto: Macmillan, 1938). Her work drew some critical attention at its time of publication. Logan and French, in Highways of Canadian Literature, included her among the poets "Second Renaissance Period" of Canadian poetry, although their reasons for praising her were not inspired by an admiration for her Imagism. They claim "Louise Morey Bowman shows an airy fancy which is almost so ethereal as to be altogether abstract and unearthly." Ironically, this observation points toward one of the major weaknesses of her poetry. It often is, as Desmond Pacey described it, "deficient in substance and strength.

Barry Callaghan has claimed that W.E. Ross was "the first modern poet in Canada". He bases this claim upon the assumption that Ross introduced Imagism into Canadian poetry. But Ross was not the first Canadian to write in the Imagist manner (though he was probably the first to dedicate himself totally to it). Four years before his first published poem appeared in Dial in 1928, Bowman had published Dream Tapestries, a book which contained several poems that were clearly Imagist in technique. Her earlier book, Moonlight and Common Day had also reflected a definite imagist influence.

== Books of poetry ==
Moonlight and Common Day exhibits the influence of nineteenth century writers such as Wordsworth, Poe, and Swinburne, as well as hints of influence from modern poets. Some of the poems are openly didactic, some are "modernist" but not Imagist, and others show Imagist tendencies. She seems caught between the style of the old acknowledged masters and the methods of modernist poetry.

Dream Tapestries has the same unevenness of style and attitude which characterized Moonlight and Common Day. In a few poems, however, Bowman does succeed in writing in the Imagist vein. The book is divided into several sections and one section, entitled "Cinquains, "contains five Imagist pieces. These poems are especially interesting because they show the coming together of the Canadian setting with the Imagist style. Another interesting, though less successful, piece in the "Cinquains" group is "Twelve Hokku on a Canadian Theme." Modelled upon Wallace Stevens' "Thirteen ways of looking at a blackbird," it deals with twelve aspects of Canadian life both past and present and urban and rural. Most of these hokku are quite flat but in one or two she manages to make the images work.

Bowman's last, and poorest, volume is Characters in Cadence and it appeared in 1938, six years before her death. On the whole, it marks a return to the uneven style and derivativeness of her first book. There is, however, one very short Imagist gem. It is the second of a series of poems called "Portraits of Five Sinners":

Her little window-sills were all too narrow
To hold her pots of lilting daffodils.

These two lines exemplify the power of the image to evoke the deepest of insights with the least amount of verbiage. The reader is left with the feeling that a narrowness lies within the "her" of the poem. This narrowness is her "sin." Her soul cannot accommodate the "lilting daffodils" of feeling which life has to offer.

== Conclusion ==
With Imagism, Bowman was unable to break away from the grip of the Romanticism which dominated the Canadian literary scene. Her poems are a mixture of the old and new. Her career can serve to symbolize the slow and painful struggle which Canadian poetry underwent in its transition from Victorian to modern styles.
