= Henry Bowman (composer) =

English musician (fl. 1677)

Henry Bowman (fl. 1677), was an English composer musician, based in Oxford, of whose life little is recorded.

He was probably a connection of that Franc. Bowman mentioned by Anthony à Wood as a bookseller of St. Mary's parish, Oxford, with whom lodged Thomas Wren, the bishop of Ely's son, an amateur musician of repute in Oxford.

Bowman was organist of Trinity College, Cambridge, and published in 1677 at Oxford a thin folio volume of Songs for one, two, and three Voices to Thorow Bass; with some short Simphonies collected out of some of the Select Poems of the incomparable Mr. Cowley and others, and composed by H. B., Philo Musicus. A second edition was brought out at Oxford in 1679. The Oxford Music School Collection contains some English songs and a set of Fifteen Ayres, which were 'first performed in the schooles 5 Feb. 1673-4.' In the same collection are some Latin motets by Bowman, and the Christ Church Collection contains a manuscript Miserere by him. In 1677, Bowman was the first English composer to publish in the above-mentioned collection the first symphony songs, in the genre later made better known by Henry Purcell.
