= Richard Irving Bowman =

American artist (1918–2001)

Richard Irving Bowman (1918–2001) was an abstract painter who worked primarily in the San Francisco Bay Area. He painted in an idiosyncratic style inspired by transcendental visions of nature, exposure to surrealism and investigations into sub-atomic physics. He is considered one of the first fine artists to employ fluorescent paint, which he maintained embodied sub-atomic life energy, beginning in the early 1950s.

== Background ==
Bowman was born in Rockford, Illinois in 1918. He graduated from the Art Institute of Chicago School in 1942, and received a master's degree in Fine Arts from the University of Iowa in 1949. During the 1940s he taught at the Art Institute of Chicago. One of his students was the abstract expressionist painter Joan Mitchell, with whom he exhibited and was romantically linked. In 1949, he moved to the Bay Area at the invitation of Gordon Onslow Ford, where he received a year long appointment teaching at Stanford University in Stanford, CA. In 1950 he was invited to teach in the newly formed art department at the University of Manitoba, Winnipeg, Canada. In 1954 he returned to San Francisco and taught intermittently at Stanford University through 1963. Bowman's reputation and success rose during the period from 1959-1977, when he exhibited continuously at the Rose Rabow Gallery.

== Exhibitions ==
Bowman was the subject of one-person shows at the Pinacotecha Gallery, New York (1947), The Stanford Art Gallery, Palo Alto, CA (1950,56) and the San Francisco Museum of Art, San Francisco, CA (1961,1970). He exhibited at the Rose Rabow Gallery in San Francisco 1959-1977, and was associated with expatriate painters Gordon Onslow-Ford and other artists who coalesced around the space. He was a peripheral figure in the San Francisco Bay Area beat and abstract expressionist scenes and was linked through friendship and aesthetics to the artist, publisher and scientist Bern Porter, and the poet Kenneth Patchen.

=== One-Person exhibitions ===
- Pinacotecha Gallery (Rose Fried Gallery) New York, 1945
- Milwaukee Art Institute, Milwaukee, Wisconsin, 1946
- Swetzoff Gallery, Boston, MA, 1949
- Stanford University, Palo Alto, CA, 1950, 1956
- Rose Rabow Gallery, 1959–1977
- San Francisco Museum of Art, 1961, 1970
- Roswell Museum of Art, New Mexico, 1972
- Harcourts Gallery, 1986
- Steven Wolf Fine Arts, 2001
- The Landing gallery, Los Angeles, 2019

=== Two-Person Exhibitions ===
- Art Institute of Chicago (with Russsel Woeltz), 1945
- University of Illinois (with Joan Mitchell), 1947
- San Francisco Museum of Art (with Gordon Onslow-Ford), 1959

=== Selected Group Exhibitions ===
- Art Institute of Chicago, 1945
- Toronto Gallery of Art, 1953
- São Paulo Biennial, 1953
- Montreal Museum of Art, 1954
- Whitney Museum of American Art, 1961
- Carnegie Institute, Pittsburgh, Pennsylvania, 1961, 1963
- Gallery Scheiner, Basel, Switzerland, 1978

Richard Bowman: Radiant Abstractions, essays by Patricia Watts and Stefanie De Winter, published by Watts Art Publications, 2018.

Richard Bowman: Forty years of Abstract Painting, edited by Kim Eagle-Smith, Published by Harold Parker in collaboration with Harcourts Gallery, Inc., 1986.

Richard Bowman, Paintings and Reflections, 1943-1961, San Francisco Museum of Art, 1961.

A Commentary on the Relation of Science and Art, in Conjunction With a Retrospective of Paintings, Stanford University Art Gallery, 1956.

Richard Bowman, Paintings, 1943-1972, Roswell Museum and Art Center, 1972.
