= Dave Bowman (musician) =

American jazz pianist (1914–1964)

David Walter Bowman (September 8, 1914 – December 28, 1964) was an American jazz pianist.

He was born in Buffalo, New York, United States. Bowman was raised in Hamilton, Ontario, Canada, where he learned to play piano as a four year old. He lived in Pittsburgh, Pennsylvania for a time, then worked in London with Jack Hylton in the mid-1930s. After returning to the United States he settled in New York and played with Bobby Hackett, Sharkey Bonano, Sidney Bechet, and Bud Freeman late in the decade. In the early 1940s, he worked with Jack Teagarden, Joe Marsala, Muggsy Spanier, Lee Wiley, and Eddie Condon. He took positions with ABC and NBC in the later 1940s (including with Perry Como) and worked as a studio musician on recordings. In the 1950s, he worked with Bud Freeman again, and with Phil Napoleon shortly before his own death.

Dave Bowman died in an automobile accident in December 1964, in Miami, Florida.

== Bibliography ==
- James M. Doran, "Dave Bowman". The New Grove Dictionary of Jazz. Third edition, ed. Barry Kernfeld. ISBN 978-0333632314
