= Sir William Bowman, 1st Baronet =

English surgeon, histologist and anatomist (1816–1892)

Sir William Bowman, Bt
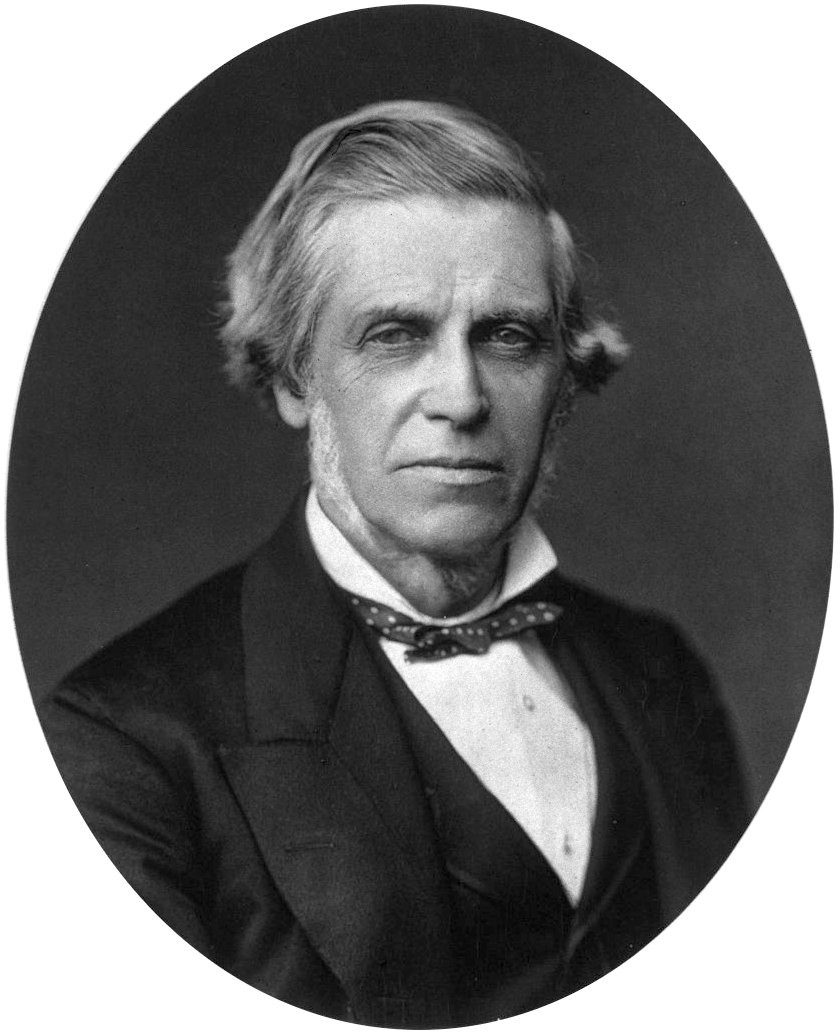
- Sir William Bowman, 1st Baronet
- Born: 20 July 1816; Nantwich, Cheshire, England
- Died: 29 March 1892 (aged 75); Holmbury St Mary, Surrey
- Known for: Bowman's Capsule; Bowman's glands Bowman's layer Microscopes
- Awards: Royal Medal (1842)
- Scientific career
- Fields: Surgeon; Histologist; Anatomist

Sir William Bowman, 1st Baronet (20 July 1816 – 29 March 1892) was an English surgeon, histologist and anatomist. He is best known for his research using microscopes to study various human organs, though during his lifetime he pursued a successful career as an ophthalmologist.

== Early life ==
Born in Nantwich, Cheshire, he was third son of John Eddowes Bowman, a banker and botanist, and his wife Elizabeth Eddowes. The scholar Eddowes Bowman and the architect Henry Bowman were his elder brothers.

Bowman attended Hazelwood School near Birmingham from 1826. He was apprenticed first at age 16, according to the Oxford Dictionary of National Biography, to W. A. Betts at Birmingham; this may in fact have been Henry Augustus Betts, MRCS in 1832, in Birmingham in his early career, before moving to Stourbridge. He was then under Joseph Hodgson, also at Birmingham General Hospital, in 1832. He also assisted Peyton Blakiston FRS on research to measure the orifices of the heart. Blakiston gave him a microscope made by Hugh Powell.

In 1837 Bowman left Birmingham in 1837 to further his training as a surgeon and attended King's College London. There he served as a prosector under Robert Bentley Todd, a Professor of physiology.

== In practice ==
After completing his surgical training in 1844, Bowman practised as an ophthalmologist at the Royal London Ophthalmic Hospital (later known as Moorfields Eye Hospital). He was an early user of the ophthalmoscope invented by Hermann von Helmholtz in 1851. Between 1848 and 1855, he also taught at King's College. In 1880, he founded the 'Ophthalmological Society', which later became the Royal College of Ophthalmologists.

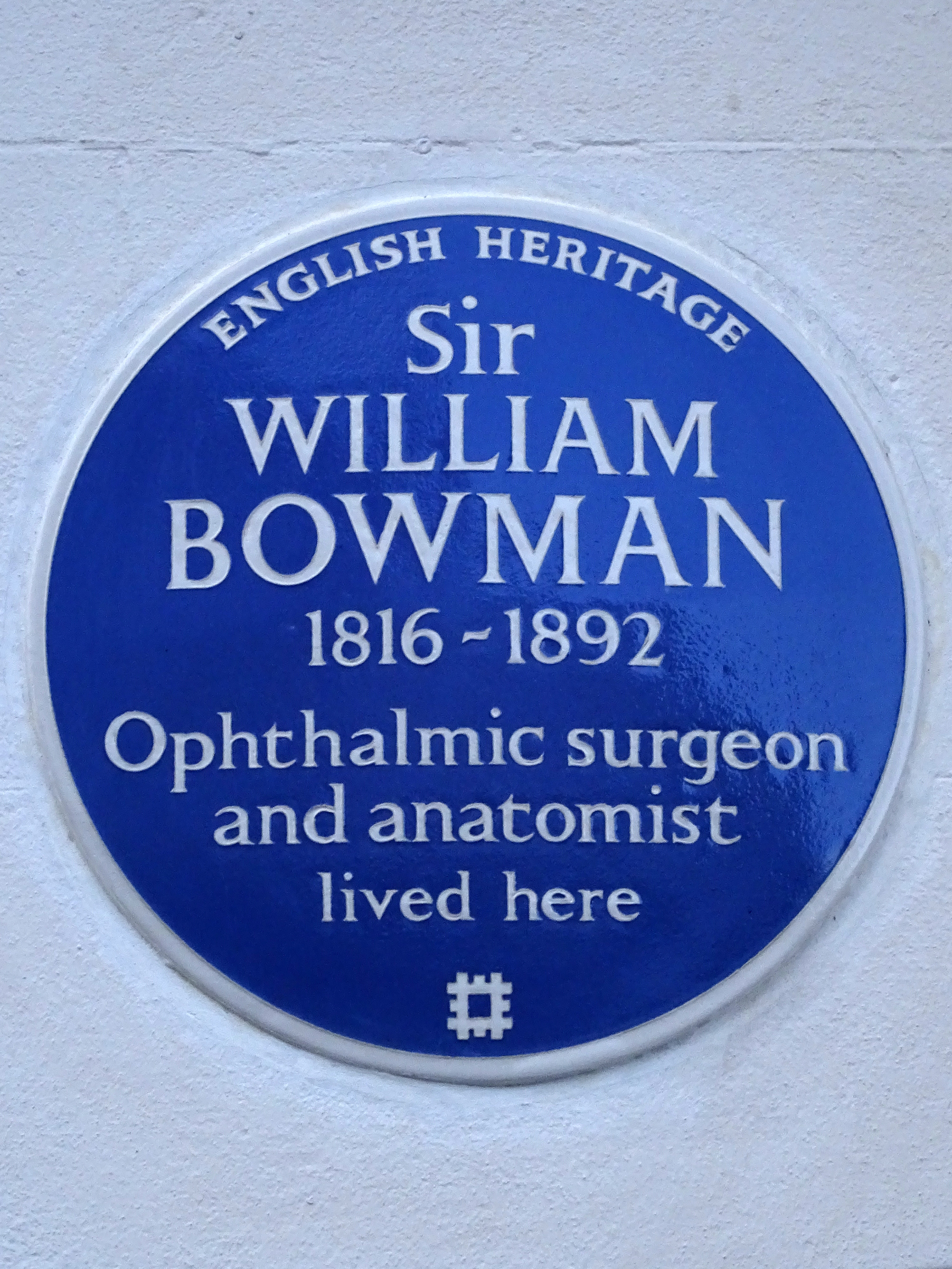
Blue plaque marking William Bowman's residence on North End Road, Golders Green

In 1870 he commissioned Arts and Crafts architect Philip Webb to rebuild Joldwynds, Bowman's house in Holmbury St Mary, Surrey. It was completed in 1874.

In 1884, Queen Victoria created him as a baronet. He died at Joldwynds on 29 March 1892, and is buried in the neighbouring churchyard of Holmbury St. Mary. A memorial to him lies within St James's Church, Piccadilly.

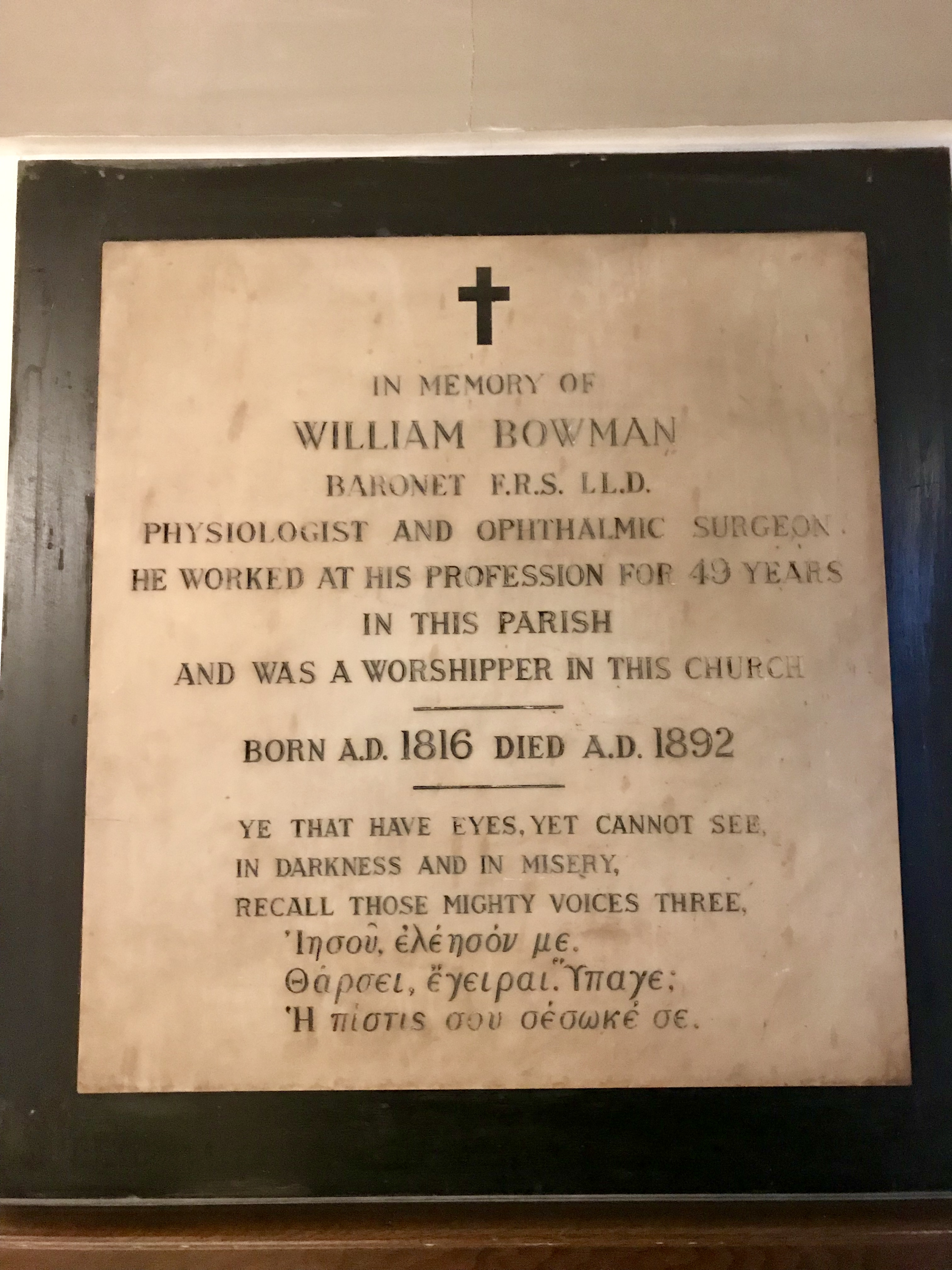
A memorial to Sir William Bowman, 1st Baronet, in St James's Church, Piccadilly

== Works ==
Bowman's earliest notable work was on the structure of striated muscle, for which he was elected a Fellow of the Royal Society in 1841. At the age of 25, he identified what then became known as Bowman's capsule, a key component of the nephron. He presented his findings in 1842 in his paper "On the Structure and Use of the Malpighian Bodies of the Kidney" to the Royal Society and was awarded the Royal Medal. His collaboration with Todd led to the publication of the five-volume "Physiological Anatomy and Physiology of Man" (1843–1856) and "Cyclopaedia of Anatomy and Physiology" (1852), which detailed their research on microscopy and histology, relating minute anatomical observations to physiological functions. Their extensive use of the microscopes revolutionized the study of anatomy and physiology. Apart from the Bowman's capsule, other anatomical structures named after him include:

- Bowman's glands – in the olfactory mucosa
- Bowman's layer – the anterior limiting layer in the cornea

=== Publications ===
- Todd, Robert Bentley; Bowman, William (1857), The Physiological Anatomy and Physiology of Man, Philadelphia: Blanchard and Lea, full download available at Google Book Search.
- Bowman, William (1849), Lectures on the parts concerned in the operations on the eye, and on the structure of the retina: Delivered at the Royal London Ophthalmic Hospital, Moorfields, June 1847. To which are Added, a Paper on the Vitreous Humor; and Also a Few Cases of Ophthalmic Disease, London: Longman, Brown, Green, and Longmans, full download available at Google Book Search.

== Family ==
On 28 December 1842, Bowman married Harriet, fifth daughter of Thomas Paget of Leicester, by whom he had seven children. She died at Joldwynds on 25 October 1900. He was succeeded in the title by his eldest son, Sir Paget Bowman.

== Sources ==
- Galst, Jay M (April 2007), "Sir William Bowman (1816–1892).", Archives of Ophthalmology, 125 (4): 459, doi:10.1001/archopht.125.4.459, PMID 17450657
- Frixione, Eugenio (2006), "Muscle microanatomy and its changes during contraction: the legacy of William Bowman (1816–1892).", Journal of Muscle Research and Cell Motility, 27 (1): 9–20, doi:10.1007/s10974-005-9048-z, PMID 16465470, S2CID 20472873
- Haviv, Y S (February 2000), "Figures in the historical dispute over renal function. Part II: Karl Ludwig versus Rudolph Heidenhain and William Bowman.", Journal of Medical Biography, vol. 8, no. 1, pp. 32–8, doi:10.1177/096777200000800107, PMID 10994045, S2CID 12239557
- Eknoyan, G (December 1996), "Sir William Bowman: his contributions to physiology and nephrology.", Kidney Int., vol. 50, no. 6, pp. 2120–8, doi:10.1038/ki.1996.538, PMID 8943499
- Roman, F S (October 1992), "Sir William Bowman", The British Journal of Ophthalmology, 76 (10): 639, doi:10.1136/bjo.76.10.639, PMC 505252, PMID 1420050
- Trevor-Roper, P (March 1992), "Sir William Bowman—1816–1892", The British Journal of Ophthalmology, vol. 76, no. 3, p. 129, doi:10.1136/bjo.76.3.129, PMC 504187, PMID 1540552
- Davis, B T (1982), "The formative years of Sir William Bowman, F. R. S", Histoire des sciences médicales, vol. 17, no. Spec 2, pp. 169–71, PMID 11612284
- Law, F W (1975), "Sir William Bowman", Survey of Ophthalmology, vol. 19, no. 5, pp. 302–7, PMID 1092012
- Lilien, O M (July 1972), "Sir William Bowman (1816–1892)", Investigative Urology, 10 (1): 107–8, ISSN 0021-0005, PMID 4556711
- Grondona, F (September 1971), [Structure and function of the kidney according to William Bowman], Clio Medica (Amsterdam, Netherlands), vol. 6, pp. 195–204, PMID 4113808
- Thomas, K B (July 1966), "The manuscripts of Sir William Bowman", Medical History, vol. 10, no. 3, pp. 245–56, doi:10.1017/s002572730001111x, PMC 1033604, PMID 5330007

Baronetage of the United Kingdom
New creation	Baronet (of Holmbury St Mary); 1884–1892	Succeeded by William Paget Bowman
