= John Eddowes Bowman the Younger =

English chemist (1819–1854)

John Eddowes Bowman the Younger (1819–1854) was an English chemist.

== Life ==
Bowman was the son of John Eddowes Bowman the elder, and brother of Sir William Bowman, physiologist and oculist, born at Welchpool on 7 July 1819. He was a pupil of John Frederic Daniell at King's College, London, and in 1845 succeeded William Allen Miller as demonstrator of chemistry there; he became subsequently, in 1851, the first professor of practical chemistry there. He was one of the founders of the Chemical Society of London. He died on 10 February 1854.

== Works ==
Bowman published:

- A Lecture on Steam Boiler Explosions, 1845
- An Introduction to Practical Chemistry (London, 1848, Philadelphia, 1849; subsequent editions in 1854, 1858, 1861, 1866, and 1871)
- A Practical Handbook of Medical Chemistry (London, 1850, 1852, 1855, and 1862). Further editions of these latter works were edited by Charles Loudon Bloxam.

He also contributed to scientific journals.

== Family ==
Bowman married in 1844 Ellen Paget (died 1868), fourth daughter of the surgeon Thomas Paget of Leicester.
