= Bowman baronets =

Set index for Bowman baronets

There have been two baronetcies created for persons with the surname Bowman, both in the Baronetage of the United Kingdom. Both titles are extinct.

- Bowman baronets of Holmbury St Mary (1884)
- Bowman baronets of Killingworth (1961)
