= John Eddowes Bowman the Elder =

British banker and naturalist

John Eddowes Bowman the Elder (30 October 1785 – 4 December 1841) was a British banker and naturalist.

== Background ==
Bowman was born 30 October 1785 at Nantwich, where his father, Eddowes Bowman (1758–1844), was a tobacconist. His education was only that of a grammar school, but he was a bookish boy, and got from his father a taste for botany, and from his friend Joseph Hunter, then a lad at Sheffield, a fondness for genealogy. He was at first in his father's shop, and became manager of the manufacturing department, and traveller. He wished to enter the ministry of the Unitarian body to which his family belonged, but his father dissuaded him. In 1813 he joined, as junior partner, a banking business on which his father entered. Its failure in 1816 left him penniless, and he became manager at Welshpool of a branch of the bank of Beck & Co. of Shrewsbury. In 1824 he became managing partner of a bank at Wrexham, and was able to retire from business in 1830. From 1837 he resided in Manchester, where he pursued many branches of physical science.

He was elected to membership of the Manchester Literary and Philosophical Society on 17 April 1838. He was a fellow of the Linnean Society of London and the Geological Society, and one of the founders of the Manchester Geological Society. His discoveries were chiefly in relation to mosses, fungi, and parasitic plants. A minute fossil, which he detected in Derbyshire, is named from him the 'Endothyra Bowmanni.' In the last years of his life he devoted himself almost entirely to geology. He died on 4 Dec. 1841.

== Works ==
He contributed papers to the Transactions of the Linnean and other learned societies, and to London's Magazine of Natural History. He was also the author of one book: The Highlands and Islands : A Nineteenth-Century Tour, A. Sutton, reprinted by Hippocrene Books, 1986. ISBN 0-8705-2316-3

== Family ==
He married, 6 July 1809, his cousin, Elizabeth (1788–1859), daughter of W. Eddowes of Shrewsbury. A daughter, married to George S. Kenrick, died in November 1838. Four sons survived him :

- Eddowes Bowman, polymath and religious dissenter
- Henry Bowman, architect
- Sir William Bowman, ophthalmologist
- John Eddowes Bowman the younger, professor of chemistry
