= William Ernest Bowman =

English writer (1911–1985)

- Born: 30 September 1911; Scarborough, North Riding of Yorkshire, England
- Died: 1 January 1985 (aged 73)
- Occupations: Draughtsman, Civil Engineer
- Writing career
- Genres: Humour, satire
- Notable work: The Ascent of Rum Doodle

William Ernest Bowman (30 September 1911 in Scarborough – 1 January 1985) was an engineer and writer, best remembered for his 1956 book The Ascent of Rum Doodle, a satire on the world of mountaineering literature inspired by Bill Tilman and his 1937 account of the Nanda Devi expedition. Bowman's work was a send-up of the rather pompous British expedition book style fashionable in the 1930s through to the 1950s.

== Early life and family ==
Bill Bowman was the eldest of a family of three boys. His mother died in 1926 when Bill was 15, and his father in 1928 from World War I exposure to mustard gas. This led to a separation of the three brothers - Bill to Middlesbrough, the middle brother, John Howard (Howie), to Canada and the youngest, Lawrence, sent to live with another family.

== Service in the RAF and peace activism ==
Bill left school when he was 16, subsequently following a career as draughtsman and civil engineer. During World War II he served in Egypt as a radar instructor for the Royal Air Force (RAF), and afterwards joined the International Voluntary Service for Peace in Duisburg, Germany. His pacifist convictions persuaded him to return his RAF paybook to the government.

== Parody of the Kon-Tiki expedition and interpretation of the theory of relativity ==
The Cruise of the Talking Fish is Bowman's only other published work. It is a parody of the Kon-Tiki Expedition by Thor Heyerdahl. He did, however, write a number of pieces including a layman's interpretation of Relativity and several short stories. Bowman's leisure activities included hillwalking and painting.
