= Armenians in the United Kingdom =

Ethnic group in the United Kingdom

Total population
- 18,000

Regions with significant populations
- London, Manchester, Liverpool, Birmingham, Edinburgh

Languages
- Armenian, English, Russian, French, Persian, Arabic, Turkish, Greek

Religion
- Armenian Apostolic Church, Armenian Catholic Church, Armenian Evangelical Church

Related ethnic groups
- Armenian diaspora

Armenians in the United Kingdom consists mainly of British citizens who are fully or partially of Armenian descent. There has been sporadic emigration from Armenia to the UK since the 18th century, with the biggest influx coming after the Second World War. The majority are based in the major cities of London and Manchester. The 2001 UK Census recorded 589 Armenian-born people living in the UK, and in 2013, the Office for National Statistics estimated that there were 1,235 people born in Armenia resident in the UK, with the number of Armenian nationals being 1,720, although it has been estimated by the Armenian Diaspora Conference that there are up to 18,000 ethnic Armenians including those who are British-born, and of part Armenian descent, living in the UK.

== History ==
Antonia Gransden (University of Nottingham) writes about the visit to the monastery of St. Albans in 1228 of the Armenian Archbishop, and in 1252 the group of Armenians. The first Armenian community in Britain was formed in Manchester in the 19th century. A mixture of textile traders, small manufacturers and retailers, in 1870 they opened the first Armenian church in Britain (the Holy Trinity Church located in Manchester). In 1896 an estimated 500 Armenians lived in London.

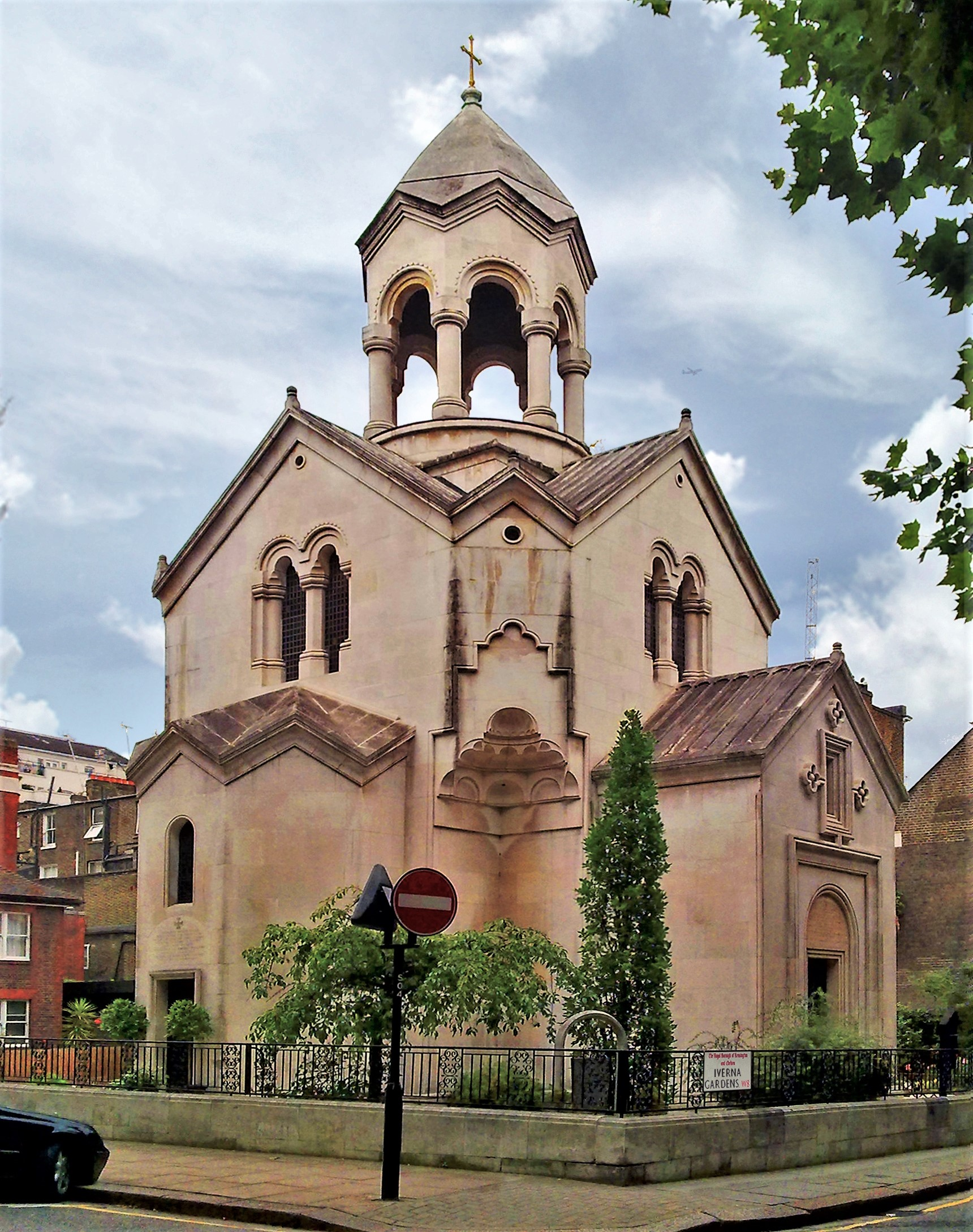
Saint Sargis Armenian church in London

On 19 July 1920, Hovhannes Masehyan was appointed by the Armenian government to serve as "envoy extraordinary and minister plenipotentiary" of Armenia to Britain. However, his appointment was disallowed by the Foreign Office which felt "discomfort and embarrassment" at such a "veteran diplomat" representing an "unstable state" to which Britain had not yet granted de jure recognition. On 12 November 1920, the Foreign Office (and later Lord Curzon) acknowledged the appointment of Jaques Bagratuni as the unofficial representative of Armenia in London.

== Population distribution ==
According to Vered Amit's Armenians in London: The Management of Social Boundaries, published in 1989, around 10,000 Armenians were living in Greater London at the time. The majority were thought to be first-generation immigrants from Lebanon, Syria, Iraq, Iran and Cyprus. They also include Armenians from Ethiopia, India, Egypt and Palestine, as well as individuals from other countries.

Manchester has been home to an Armenian population since 1835, with 30 Armenian businesses thought to have been operating in the city by 1862. Silk merchants were the original Armenian settlers in Manchester. In Easter 1870 Holy Trinity Church, an Armenian church, opened in Manchester, making it the first religious institution of that kind of in Western Europe. The Armenian Ladies Association of Manchester was in existence by the 1920s. In the early 20th century, there were Armenian mercantile communities based in London and Manchester represented by James Malcolm and H. Kamberian—the latter later became the official consul of Armenia in Manchester with the approval of the Foreign Office in October 1920.

== Media ==
The Tekeyan Cultural Union published "Erebuni" from 1979 to 1996. From 1979 to 1987, it was a bilingual Armenian/English monthly, turning into a biweekly from 1987 to 1996. For a brief period in 1993, it was published solely in English before reverting into a bilingual edition. It ceased publication in 1996.

== Churches ==
There are three Armenian Apostolic Churches in Britain: Saint Sarkis in Kensington in London; Saint Yeghiche in South Kensington, also in London; and the Holy Trinity in Chorlton-on-Medlock, Manchester. The Armenian church of the Holy Trinity was the first purpose-built Armenian church in Western Europe and was opened at Easter 1870. The architects were Royle & Bennett, 1869–70. There is also an Armenian Christian Fellowship in Chiswick, West London, a non-denominational evangelical church with services in Armenian, English and Persian. Nearby Chiswick New Cemetery has a significant number of Armenian burials.

== Academia ==
Kevork Tahta Armenian Community Sunday School in London operates under the auspices of Armenian Community of UK, providing inclusive education to promote a better knowledge of the Armenian language and culture.

The Armenian Institute cultural centre opened in London in 2001.

== List of notable British Armenians ==
- H. F. B. Lynch, British traveller, businessman, and Liberal Member of Parliament
- Michael Arlen, essayist, short story writer
- Roger Altounyan, awarded the Air Force Cross for developing new techniques in night flying
- Vivien Leigh (partly), actress; won the Academy Award for Best Actress twice
- Noel Agazarian, World War 2, Royal Air Force fighter ace
- Jack Agazarian, agent for the United Kingdom's clandestine Special Operations Executive (SOE) organization in France during World War II
- Zabelle C. Boyajian, Armenian poet
- Julian Byzantine, classical guitarist
- Levon Chilingirian OBE, musician, the founder of the Chilingirian Quartet
- Gregg Chillin, actor
- Ara Darzi, Baron Darzi of Denham KBE, surgeon and first British-Armenian peer
- David Dickinson, antiques expert and television presenter
- Calouste Gulbenkian, one of the founders of Royal Dutch Shell and oil magnate
- Robert Istepanian, professor of Data Communication at Kingston University
- Cosmo Jarvis, actor
- Baret Magarian, novelist
- Kevork Malikyan, actor, various TV roles including Mind Your Language, and films including Indiana Jones and the Last Crusade, Flight of the Phoenix
- Roland Manookian, actor, major role in the Football Factory by Nick Love
- Andre Minassian, Stock market analyst and trader
- Demis Ohandjanian, football player
- Kev Orkian, musician, comedian, actor
- George Alexander Rotinoff, founder of Rotinoff Motors
- Ara Paiaya, producer, director, and actor best known for Skin Traffik.
- Zareh Soghomonian, engineer, included in the list of global 500 leaders of the last century in Science and Engineering International Who's Who of Professionals.
- Alexander Raphael, first person of Armenian descent to become a member of the House of Commons
- Armen Sarkissian, 4th president of Armenia
- Andy Serkis, actor, director, and author best known for playing Sméagol/Gollum, in The Lord of the Rings film trilogy
- Joe Strummer, lead singer of The Clash, musician
- Dikran Tahta, mathematician and teacher

== See also ==
- Armenia–United Kingdom relations
- Armenian diaspora
- Immigration to the United Kingdom
