= Upper Brook Street Chapel, Manchester =

Church in Manchester, England

Upper Brook Street Chapel
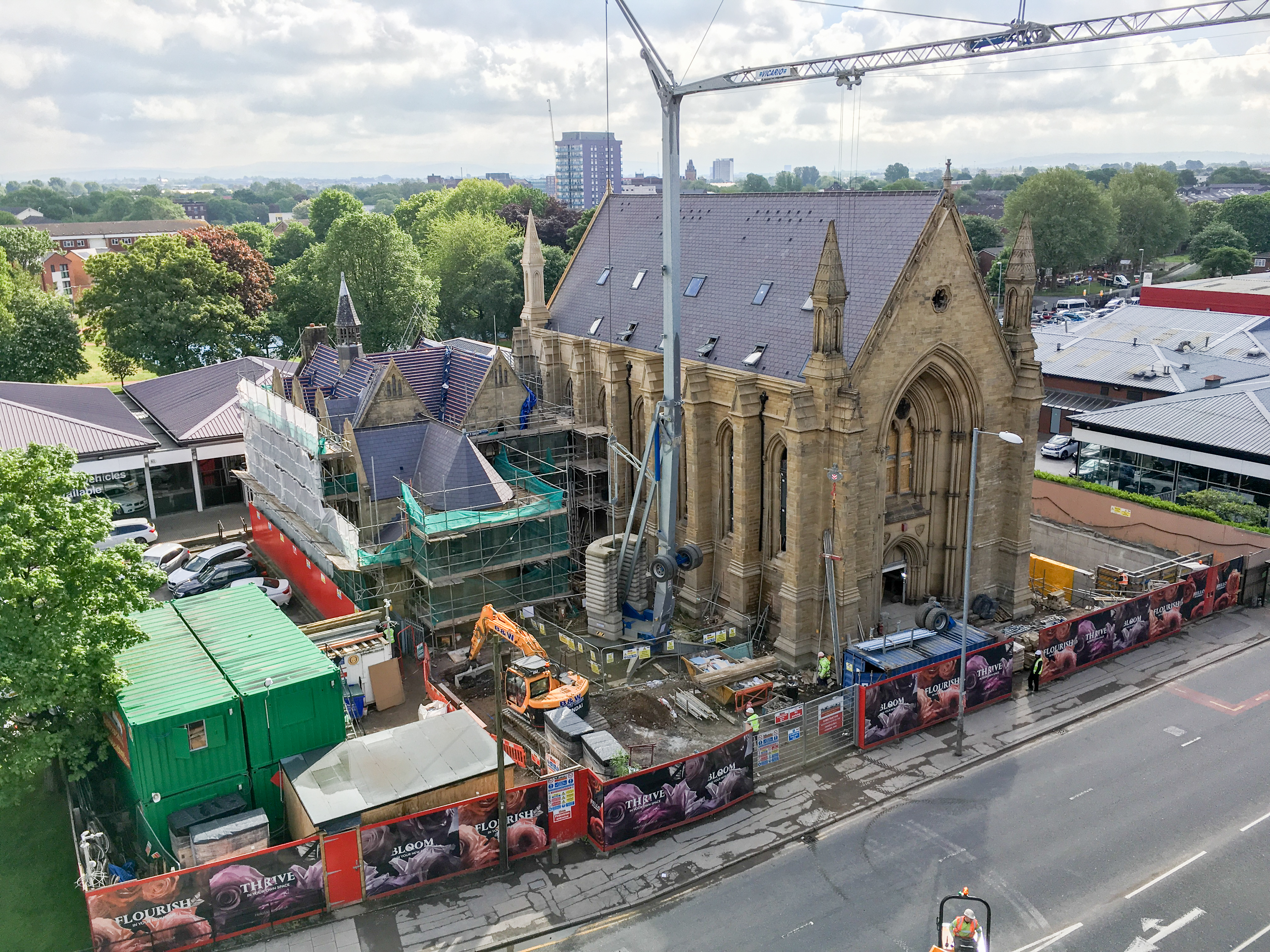
- The former chapel, in 2017

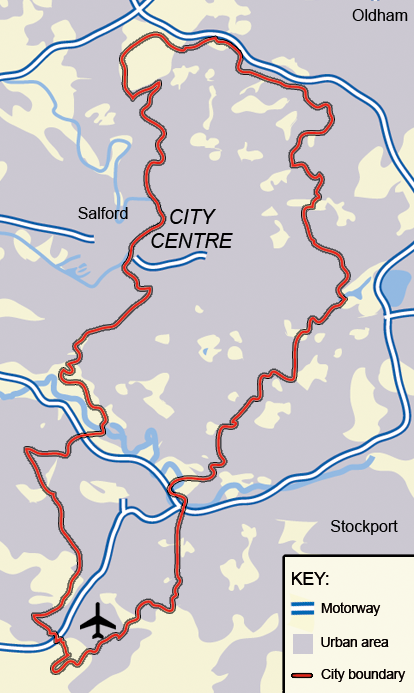
- Location of the former chapel in Manchester

Religion
- Affiliation: Unitarian (former); Baptist (former); Jehovah's Witness (former); Islam (former); Profane use
- Ecclesiastical or organizational status: Chapel (1839–1928); Church (1928–1970s); Kingdom Hall (1970s–1970s); Mosque (1974–2006); Student accommodation (since 2017)
- Status: Closed (as a chapel); Repurposed

Location
- Location: Upper Brook Street, Chorlton-on-Medlock, Manchester, England
- Interactive map of Upper Brook Street Chapel
- Coordinates: 53°28′9″N 2°13′53″W

Architecture
- Architect: Sir Charles Barry
- Type: Church architecture
- Style: Dissenting Gothic; Gothic Revival
- Groundbreaking: 1837
- Completed: 1839
- Materials: Sandtstone; slate

Listed Building – Grade II*
- Official name: Former Unitarian chapel
- Designated: 3 October 1974
- Reference no.: 1270670

The Upper Brook Street Chapel, also known as the Unitarian Chapel, the Welsh Baptist Chapel, and later Islamic Academy, is a former chapel of historical architectural importance with an attached Sunday School, located on the east side of Upper Brook Street in Chorlton-on-Medlock, Manchester, England.

Completed as a Protestant Nonconformist chapel in 1839, the building was purposed variously as a place of worship for Unitarians, Welsh Baptists, as a Kingdom Hall of Jehovah's Witnesses, and as an Islamic mosque, before its current purpose, since 2017, as student accommodation. Designed by Sir Charles Barry as the first Gothic Revival chapel for the British Unitarians, at the very beginning of the reign of Queen Victoria, the building was listed as Grade II* on the Buildings at Risk Register, rated as "very bad", on 3 October 1974. The building is owned by Manchester City Council and was partially demolished in 2006. The Victorian Society placed the building on a list of ten most threatened buildings in England and Wales. It was restored and converted to student accommodation in 2017 by Buttress Architects.

== History ==
=== Architecture ===
The chapel was designed by Sir Charles Barry, shortly before he designed the Palace of Westminster (Houses of Parliament). It was constructed between 1837 and 1839 out of sandstone, with a slate roof. It is in English Gothic Revival style. The building has seven narrow bays, with buttresses and a lancet in each bay. The west end has a giant moulded archway, with an arched doorway at the ground floor with a window above. On the east end there is a rose window. The corners are square, with pinnacles. The inside of the chapel had galleries on three sides, and a ribbed, vaulted ceiling. The attached two-storey Sunday School is in the same style as the chapel, and has a triple-gabled north side, with large arched windows on the first floor. It also has a canted apse on the west end, and a lean-to porch.

The building marked a charge in the style of Nonconformist worship locations. Previously these were mostly built with brick, and were plain, with the grander tending towards Greek architecture. Said to be the first Neogothic Nonconformist chapel, Manchester's Unitarian Chapel was preceded by the Congregational Chapel in March, Cambridgeshire, which was constructed in 1836 and is also in the Neogothic style. Chapels built following the construction of these two resembled parish churches more than the former style.

The building was listed on 3 October 1974, and is currently classed as Grade II*.

== Occupancy ==
=== Unitarians ===
The chapel was originally constructed for the Unitarians. It replaced the Mosley Street Chapel (built 1789, demolished 1836) upon its completion for baptisms, burials and marriages. The chapel was used for burial rites until 1882, the chapel had a graveyard from the outset, to both the north and south sides of the chapel. Restrictions were placed on this in 1856 and prohibited in 1882. Graves from the north side were relocated to brick vaults on the south side of the chapel around the time of the construction of the sunday school in 1877. Baptisms were performed until at least 1912, and marriages until at least 1916.

Ministers at the chapel include John James Tayler (until 1853), William Henry Herford (1866–70), Philip Wicksteed (circa 1890), John Trevor (1890–91, left to start The Labour Church) and Edward Walker Sealy (1910–?).

=== Burials ===
- Eddowes Bowman (1810–1869), educationalist and astrologer
- James McConnel Scotland born industrialist and founder of McConnel & Kennedy Mills
- George William Wood (1781–1843), Leeds born MP for Manchester South, businessman, Unitarian minister

== Other denominations ==
The chapel was sold in 1928 due to changes in the district, and was subsequently used as a Welsh Baptist Chapel. The chapel was then used as a Jehovah's Witnesses Kingdom Hall in the early 1970s. The building has been owned by Manchester City Council since the 1970s, who purchased land alongside Upper Brook Street with the aim of constructing a large motorway into Manchester, which was never realised.

Both the chapel and Sunday school were occupied by the Islamic Academy of Manchester between 1974 and 2006, when it was used as a mosque, teaching centre and for outreach work in the Asian community.

== Dereliction and redevelopment ==
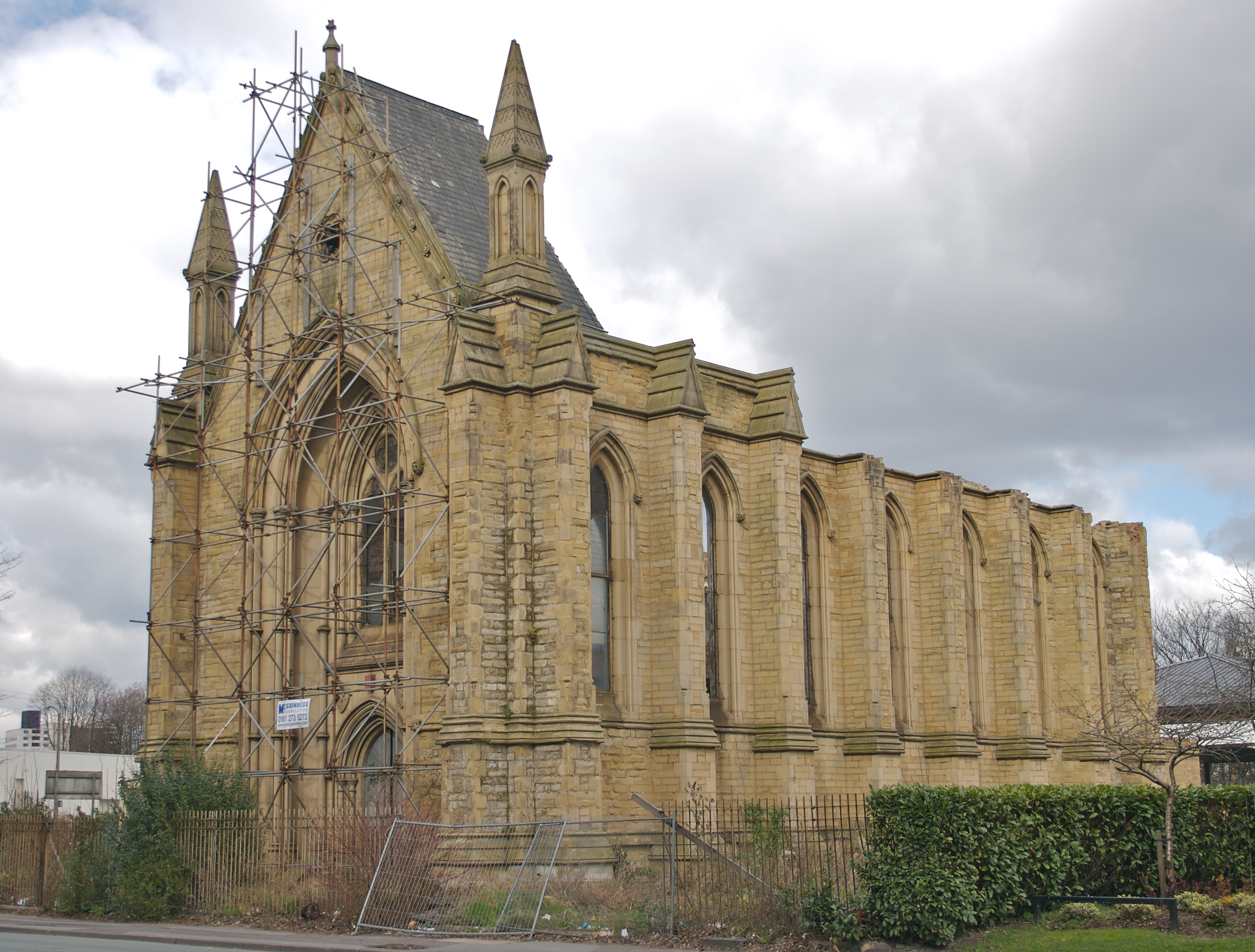
The chapel without its roof in 2008

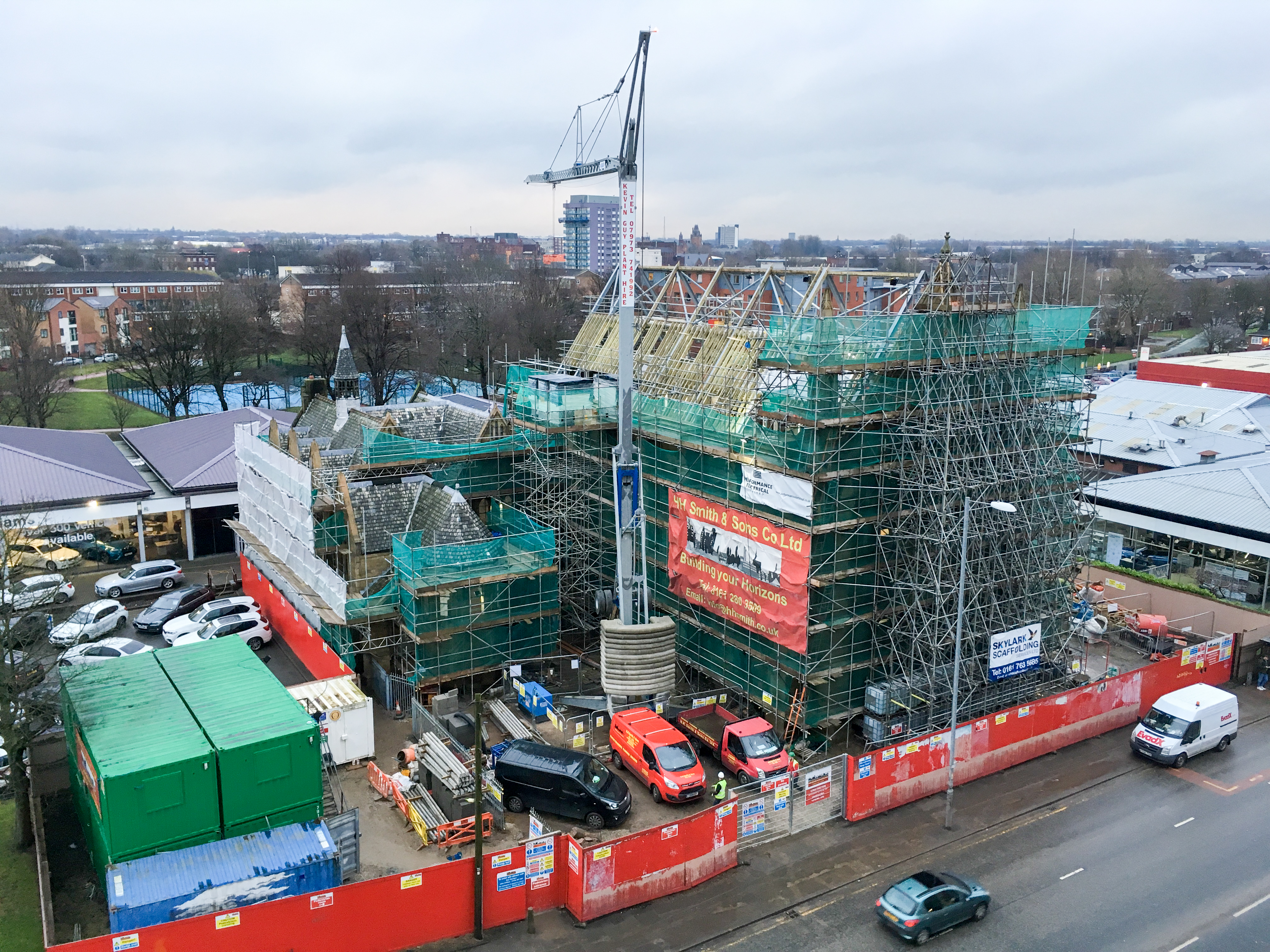
The Chapel being redeveloped in 2017

By the beginning of the 21st century, the future of the building was looking increasingly uncertain. The chapel was unsafe and substantial money was needed for emergency repairs. An unsuccessful bid to the Heritage Lottery Fund for funding to repair the building was made by the Islamic Academy in 2003. In 2001 and 2005 the city council commissioned structural advice regarding the building, prior to removing most of the roof, with the agreement of English Heritage.

Parts of the chapel were demolished at the start of 2006 on safety grounds, with scaffolding holding up some other sections. By 2010 the chapel was on the Buildings at Risk Register, rated as "very bad". The Victorian Society placed it on a list of ten most threatened buildings in England and Wales.

In October 2010, Manchester City Council announced that it was in discussion with a developer to renovate the building and bring it back into use. In August 2013, the council received a planning application from the Church Converts (Manchester) to repair the building and convert it into apartments; the application was granted in February 2014. The redevelopment by CZero Developments consisted of 73 private apartments in both the chapel and the Sunday school.

From September 2017, the building has been operating as student accommodation, with a gym, cinema room, study areas and a lounge.

== See also ==
- Dissenting Gothic
- Grade II* listed buildings in Greater Manchester
- Listed buildings in Manchester-M13
- List of former churches in England
- List of former mosques in England
