= Instant Death =

Instant Death is a Japanese light novel, manga, and anime series created by Tsuyoshi Fujitaka. Instant Death may also refer to:

- Instant Death, a band formed by bassist Dave Dreiwitz
- Instant Death (album), an album by jazz saxophonist Eddie Harris
- Instant Death, a 2017 action film directed by Ara Paiaya and starring Lou Ferrigno.
- "Instant Death", a song by rap band the Beastie Boys from the album Hello Nasty
