= Demis =

Demis is a given name. Notable people with the name include:

- Demis Grigoraș (born 1993), Romanian handball player
- Demis Hassabis (born 1976), British artificial intelligence researcher, neuroscientist, video game designer, entrepreneur and board game player
- Demis Nikolaidis (born 1973), Greek footballer
- Demis Ohandjanian (born 1978), English footballer
- Demis Roussos (1946–2015), Greek-Egyptian singer and musician
