= Manchester Central =

Manchester Central may refer to:

== United Kingdom ==
- Manchester Central Convention Complex, an exhibition and conference centre converted from the former station:
  - Manchester Central railway station, a former railway station in Manchester city centre, England
- Manchester Central Library, the main public library in Manchester
- Manchester Central Mosque, a mosque in Rusholme, Manchester
- Manchester Central (UK Parliament constituency)

=== Other places ===
- Manchester Central High School, a public high school in Manchester, New Hampshire, US

== Jamaica ==
- Manchester Central (Jamaica Parliament constituency)

== Other uses ==
- Manchester Central (Salvation Army), the principal Salvation Army church in Manchester
- Manchester Central F.C., a short lived football team

== See also ==
- Manchester city centre
