= Chorlton-on-Medlock =

Inner city area in Manchester, England

Coordinates: 53.467°N 2.217°W

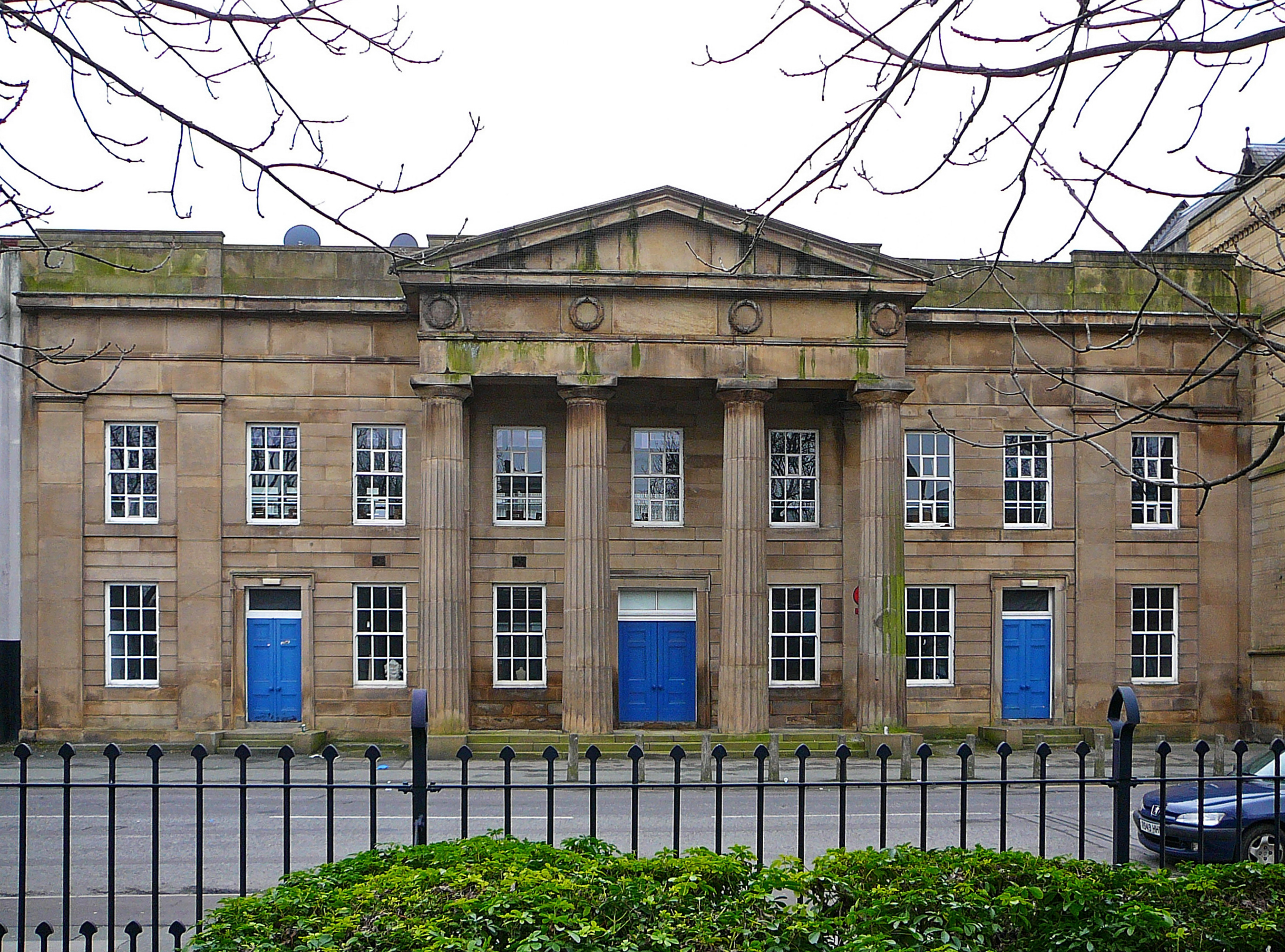
- The former Chorlton-on-Medlock Town Hall

- Location within Greater Manchester
- OS grid reference: SJ856967
- Metropolitan borough: Manchester
- Metropolitan county: Greater Manchester
- Region: North West
- Country: England
- Sovereign state: United Kingdom
- Post town: MANCHESTER
- Postcode district: M12,13
- Dialling code: 0161
- Police: Greater Manchester
- Fire: Greater Manchester
- Ambulance: North West
- UK Parliament: Manchester Central Manchester Rusholme

Chorlton-on-Medlock is an inner city area of Manchester, England.

Historically in Lancashire, Chorlton-on-Medlock is bordered to the north by the River Medlock, which runs immediately south of Manchester city centre. Its other borders roughly correspond to Stockport Road, Hathersage Road, Moss Lane East and Boundary Lane. Neighbouring districts are Hulme to the west, Ardwick to the east and Victoria Park, Rusholme and Moss Side to the south. A large portion of the district along Oxford Road is occupied by the campuses of the University of Manchester, Manchester Metropolitan University, and the Royal Northern College of Music. To the south of the university's Oxford Road campus a considerable area is occupied by a group of contiguous hospitals including Manchester Royal Infirmary, to the west of which is Whitworth Park.

== History ==
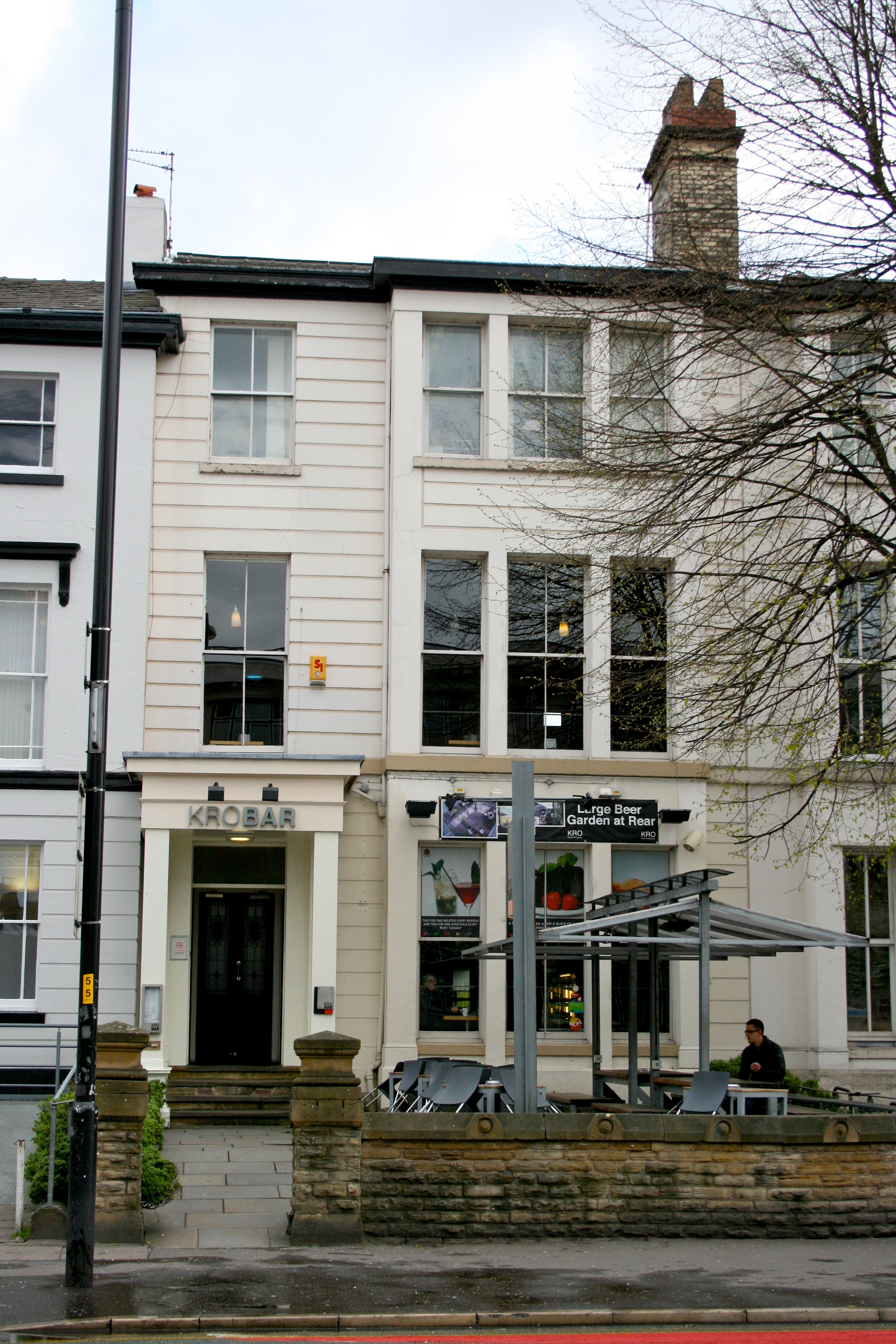
Kro Bar, 325 Oxford Road

In medieval times, the district was known as Chorlton Row and was a township of the ancient parish of Manchester in the Salford hundred of Lancashire. Towards the end of the 18th century, it developed as a residential suburb of Manchester and in the extreme north of the township a number of cotton mills were established. In 1820 the parish church of All Saints was built. Development began in 1793–94 and most of the important streets were given impressive names, Oxford Street, Cambridge Street and Grosvenor Street.

Over the following 30 years residential development spread southwards as far as Tuer Street: and by the mid-1840s to High Street. Few dwellings of that period remain today apart from Waterloo Place, 323, 325, 327 and 333 Oxford Road, and Grove House (316–324).

On the creation of the municipal borough of Manchester in 1838 the township was absorbed into the borough. At this time the southern area was still partly rural with some larger dwellings of wealthy people (e.g., John Owens in Nelson Street). After the Poor Law Reform of 1834 the district became part of the Chorlton Poor Law Union and the offices of the Board of Guardians were built in Cavendish Street (these are now the Ormond Building of the Metropolitan University). The arrival of Owens College in 1873 was the beginning of a different kind of development leading to the academic campus of today.

In 1866 Chorlton upon Medlock became a separate civil parish, on 26 March 1896 the parish was abolished to form South Manchester. In 1891 the parish had a population of 59,620.

Though most of the township was originally middle class in character by the early 20th century it was very much a working class district. The housing conditions were described in 1931 by the Manchester and District Social Survey Society.

Between the arrival of Owens College in 1873 and the 1940s the college and the university it became slowly expanded into the adjacent residential areas which had by then a mostly working class population including many of Irish descent. However, during the early years of the 21st century the University of Manchester undertook an extensive Capital Development Project which was followed by a partnership with the city council and other bodies called Corridor Manchester. Together these have changed the face of Oxford Road to a remarkable extent.

== Geography ==
The M13 postcode district includes both Ardwick and Chorlton-on-Medlock, although the area east of Boundary Lane and west of the Dental Hospital has a Hulme (M15) postcode, and Greenheys is now in Moss Side ward rather than Chorlton-on-Medlock. The River Medlock is the boundary with Manchester city centre, which includes the Sackville Street campus of the University of Manchester (or "North Campus" rather than "South Campus"). A large area of Chorlton-on-Medlock south-west of this is occupied by the Manchester Metropolitan University. Brunswick is an informal name for a small area east of the "South Campus".

== Transport ==
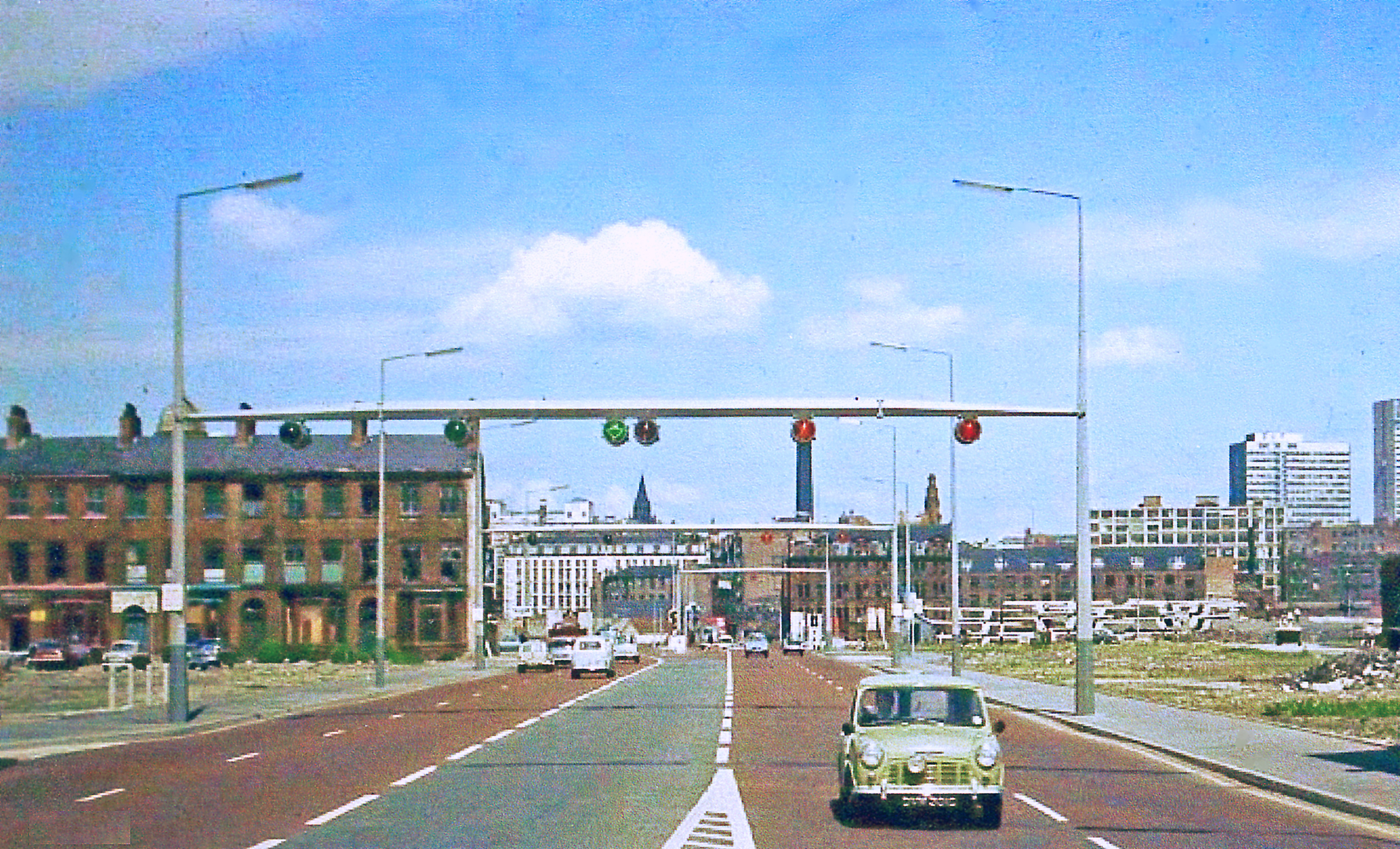
Upper Brook Street in 1966

Chorlton on Medlock is crossed by the Mancunian Way (opened 1967), running west to east through its northern part. The main routes through the suburb to south Manchester are (west to east) Cambridge Street (leading to Higher Cambridge Street, Lloyd Street North and Upper Lloyd Street), Oxford Road (leading to Wilmslow Road; the busiest route, both for private and public transport), and Upper Brook Street (dual carriageway continuing from Princess Street and leading to Anson Road).

== Landmarks ==
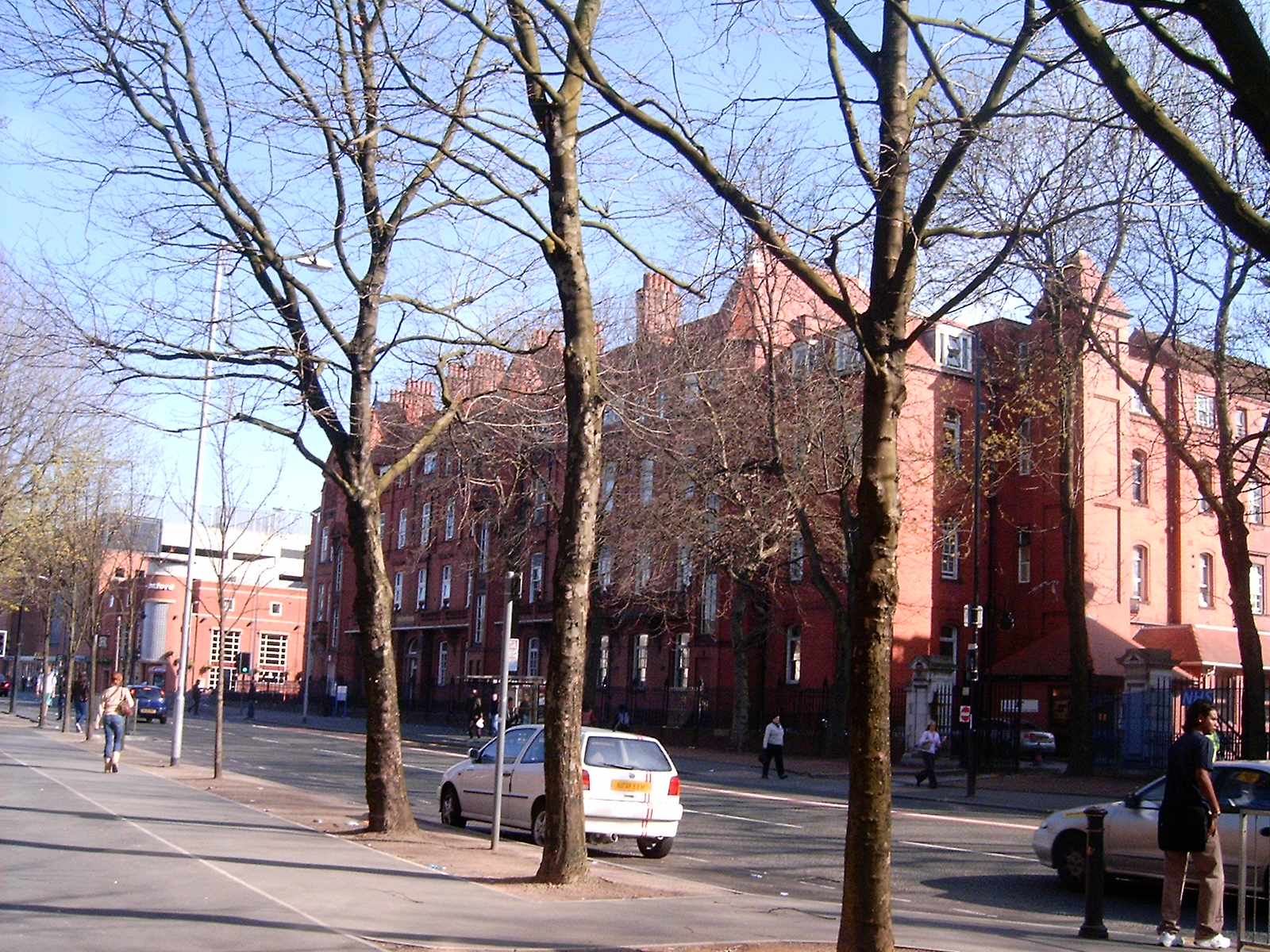
Manchester Royal Eye Hospital, 1886–2009

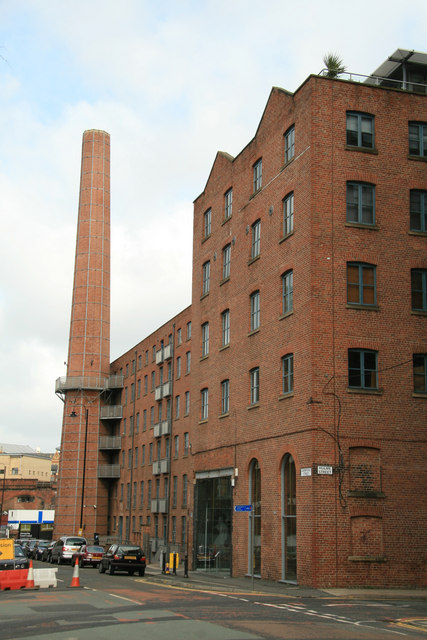
Chorlton New Mill

The façade of the former Chorlton-on-Medlock Town Hall can be seen at its original location on Cavendish Street. The building, with its Doric portico, dates from 1830 to 1831 and was designed by Richard Lane. In Nelson Street the former home of the Pankhurst family is now the Pankhurst Centre. The Ormond Building of the Manchester Metropolitan University was originally the home of the Chorlton Union Board of Guardians (responsible under the 1834 Poor Law for most of what is now south Manchester). Next to the town hall building is the original building of the Manchester College of Art (1880–81: architect George Tunstal Redmayne) in a Gothic Revival style.

Further down Oxford Road are the University of Manchester (frontage built 1888–1902), the former Manchester Royal Eye Hospital (1886), Manchester Royal Infirmary (1908) and the Whitworth Art Gallery (1898–1908).

== Religion ==
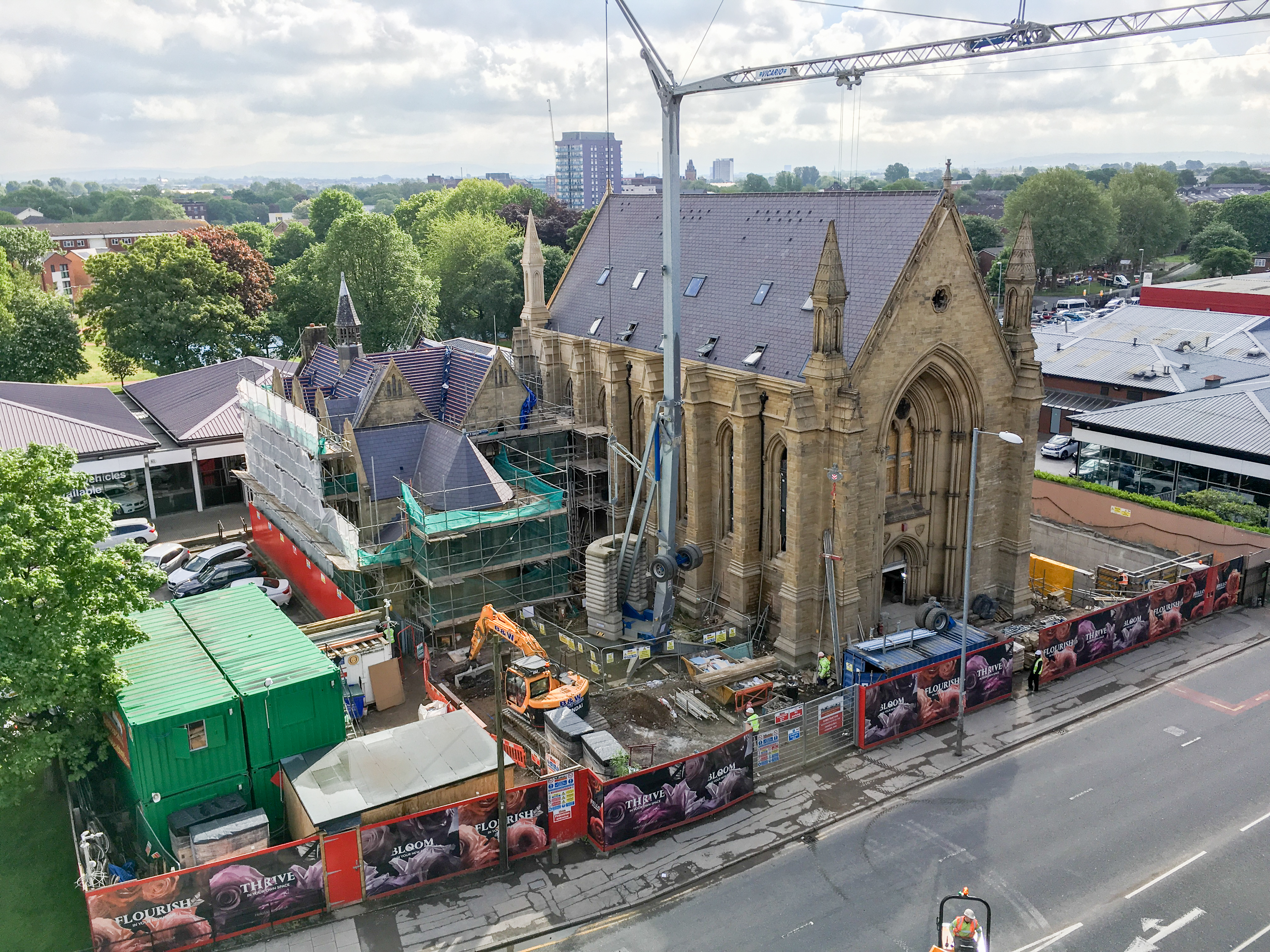
Welsh Baptist Chapel, Upper Brook Street

The parish church of All Saints (1820) and the earlier Church of St Luke (founded before 1804 but a new church was built by John Lowe in 1865; part of Old Chorlton Hall was used as the rectory) (to the east) have been demolished as have several other Anglican churches in this area. Anglican churches which are disused include St Stephen's (E. H. Shellard, 1853), St Paul's (Clegg & Knowles, 1862), and St Ambrose (H. C. Charlewood, 1884): these have all been demolished apart from St Ambrose which was used by the University of Manchester as an Islamic prayer room but the prayer room is now elsewhere. In Greenheys there was formerly an Anglican church of St Clement on Denmark Road (architect Henry R. Price, 1881, decorated by John Lowe, 1886).

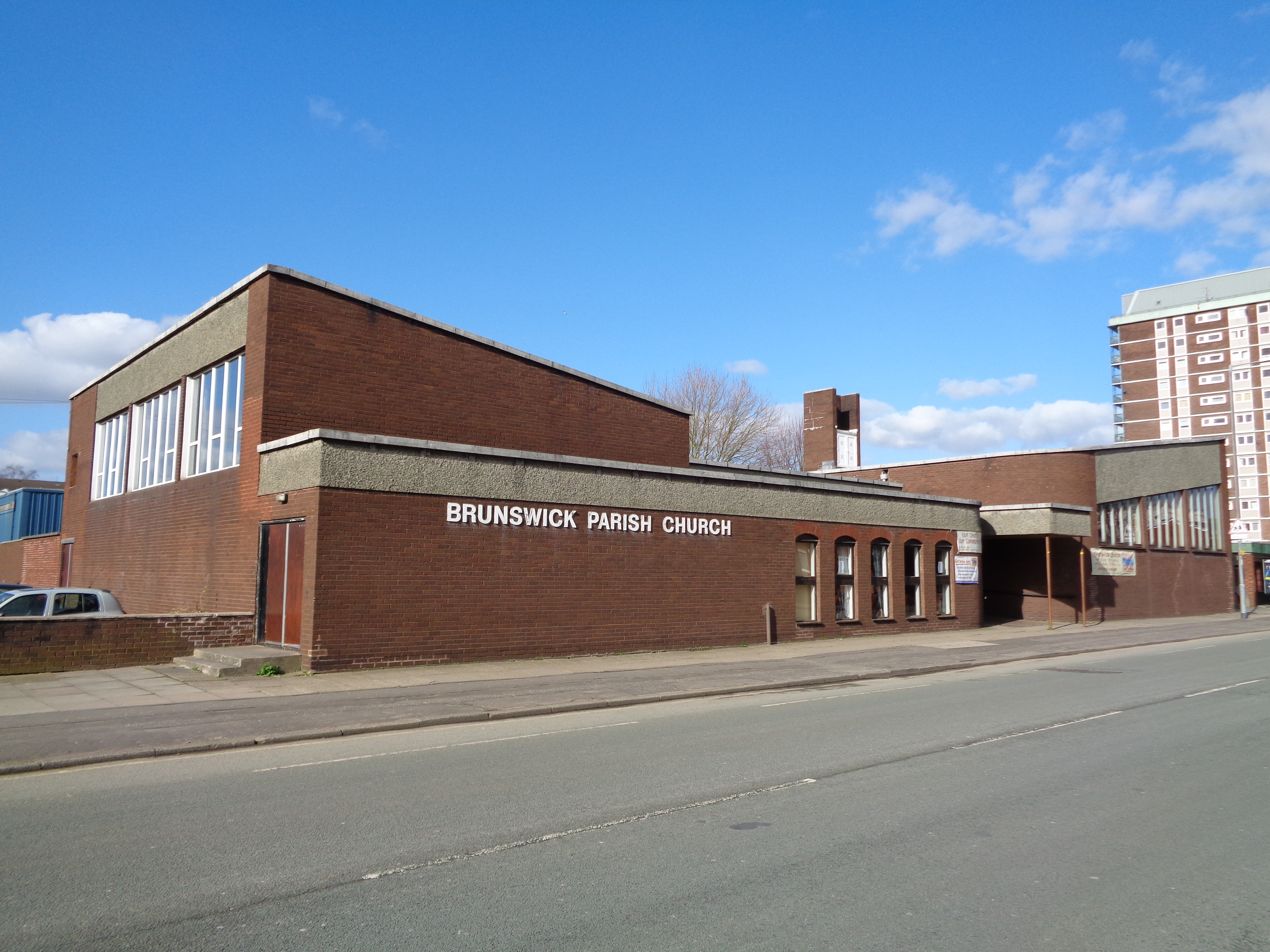
Brunswick Parish Church

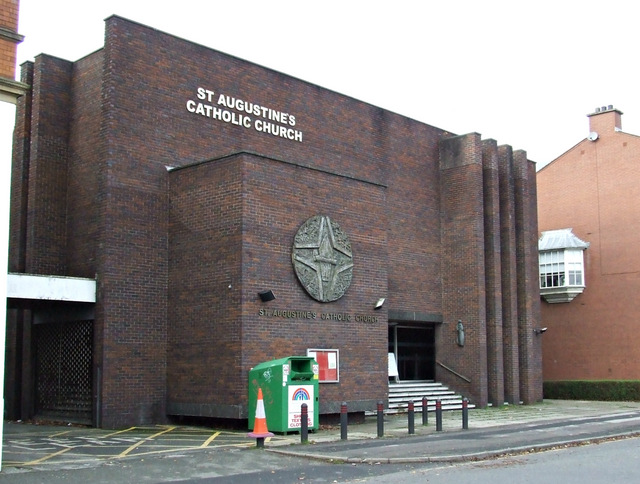
St Augustine's Catholic Church

The oldest Roman Catholic church in Chorlton-on-Medlock was the Church of the Holy Name on Oxford Road (built between 1869 and 1871), a fine example of the work of the architect Joseph Aloysius Hansom. St Augustine's, Granby Row (demolished in 1908 to allow expansion at the Municipal College of Technology) was replaced by a second St Augustine's in York Street, Chorlton-on-Medlock (ruined by German bombing in 1940 during World War II): its successor is at Lower Ormond Street on the Manchester Metropolitan University campus in a building which serves also as a chaplaincy to the university. This church was built in dark brick to the designs of Desmond Williams & Associates in 1967–68. It replaced an earlier church of the Holy Family which was at first a chapel-of-ease to St Augustine's, then an independent parish, but a chapel-of-ease again from 1908 to 1940 when it became the parish church of St Augustine's parish.

The Holy Trinity Armenian church in Upper Brook Street was the first purpose-built Armenian church in Western Europe. It is dedicated to the Holy Trinity and opened at Easter 1870. The architects were Royle & Bennett, 1869–70, and they chose an eclectic neo-Gothic style. At the east end is a rounded apse and the interior is simple though the altar is elaborate.

There were also several Nonconformist chapels (most of them now demolished) such as the Cavendish Street Congregational Church, Cavendish Street (architect Edward Walters, 1847–48), the Union Chapel on Oxford Road, Plymouth Grove Wesleyan Methodist Church (built 1879) on the corner of Hyde Grove and Plymouth Grove and a Presbyterian chapel at All Saints. The chapel in Cavendish Street was a particularly fine neo-Gothic building but was demolished in the early 1970s to allow expansion by Manchester Polytechnic. It replaced an earlier chapel in Mosley Street. The Welsh Baptist Chapel, on Upper Brook Street, was designed in the early 19th century by Sir Charles Barry, who designed the Palace of Westminster shortly afterwards, and in Greenheys there was a German Protestant Church in Wright Street (ca. 1871).

The Salvation Army's Manchester Central corps is based at Manchester Temple, Grosvenor Street. It was founded in 1879 and a modern Salvation Army building stands on the site of the original one, and is called Manchester Central.

There are two mosques in Chorlton-on-Medlock, the Salimiya Mosque and the Islamic Academy of Manchester, Upper Brook Street (in the building of the former Welsh Baptist Chapel). The former church of St Ambrose was used by the University of Manchester as an Islamic prayer room for several years. There are prayer rooms at the University of Manchester and at the Manchester Metropolitan University in Oxford Road.

== Notable people ==
See also List of people from Manchester

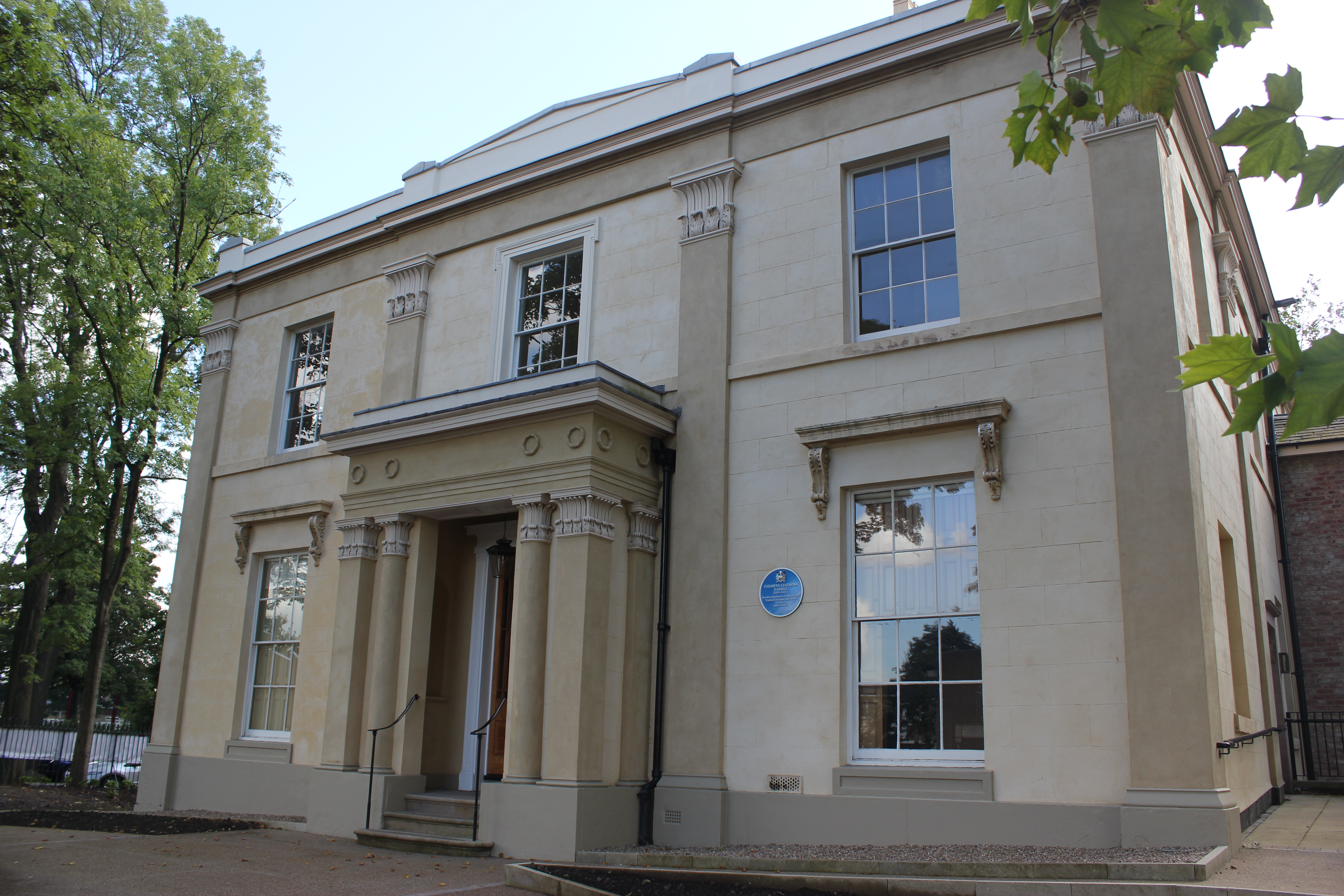
84 Plymouth Grove, home of William and Elizabeth Gaskell, from 1850

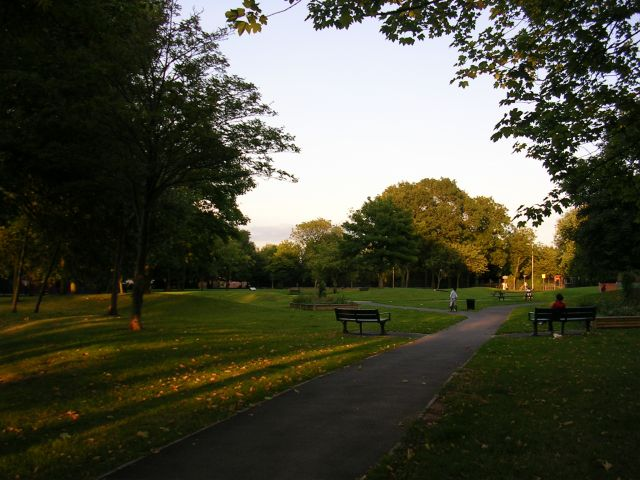
Swinton Grove Park, near 84 Plymouth Grove

=== 19th century ===
- William Edward Armytage Axon, antiquary and writer
- William Worby Beaumont (1848–1929), automotive engineer and inventor
- Maud Boyd (1867–1929), actress and operatic singer
- James Braid 1795–1860, Scottish born surgeon and hypnotist, lived and died at 212 Oxford Street (on the exact site of the old quadrangle of Manchester University; the street has been renamed Oxford Road).
- Walter Arthur Copinger, lawyer and scholar, lived in Greenheys.
- Thomas De Quincey, writer, also lived at Greenheys: he was born at Cross Street, Manchester.
- Friedrich Engels (1820–1895), German social scientist and philosopher; the site of his lodging is commemorated by a plaque on Aberdeen House, Whitworth Park Halls of Residence.
- Elizabeth Gaskell lived in a house at 84 Plymouth Grove for the last 15 years of her life.
- William Gaskell, Nonconformist minister and writer, husband of Elizabeth Gaskell
- David Lloyd George, British Prime Minister, was born here in 1863 but his family soon returned to Wales.
- George Gissing 1857–1903, writer, lived on Grafton Street when he was a student at Owens College in 1876.
- Charles Hallé, musician, lived at Greenheys for a time.
- Alfred Lucas, analytical chemist, involved in the excavation of Tutankhamun's tomb
- Lilly Maxwell, first woman to vote in Britain after the Reform Act 1832, at the Chorlton Town Hall in 1868
- William McKerrow, Scottish minister of the Presbyterian Church of England who was the minister of the Lloyd Street chapel (in the town centre) which he relocated in Brunswick Street
- Samuel Mendel, businessman, later built Manley Hall.
- John Owens the merchant (after whom Owens College was named) lived in Nelson Street.
- Robert Angus Smith, Scottish chemist, had his laboratory in Grosvenor Square.
- Lily Elsie, noted Edwardian stage actress, singer, spent part of her childhood here. *Photos of Elsie, arranged by show
- Leslie Stuart, composer of Edwardian musicals, lived at 18 Lime Grove for a time, he was organist at the Church of the Holy Name.
- Jerome Caminada, police detective and supposed inspiration for Sherlock Holmes, lived on Cecil Street Greenheys.
- Annie Swynnerton, symbolist artist, lived on 44 Dover Street.
- Eddowes Bowman, Educationalist and astronomer, was buried at Upper Brook Street Chapel.
- John Edward Taylor (1791–1844), founder of The Manchester Guardian newspaper in 1820, renamed The Guardian in 1959, was buried in the former Rusholme Road Cemetery, now called Gartside Gardens.
- Frederick Crace Calvert (1819–1873), London born chemist. Calvert contributed to the commercial feasibility of phenol production, thus facilitating hygiene worldwide and saving lives. He is buried in St Saviours churchyard.

=== 20th century ===
- James Bernard, reciter, elocutionist, author, born in Chorlton-on-Medlock in 1874
- John Cassidy, sculptor, worked at a studio in Lincoln Grove, also lodged in the district.
- Johnny Roadhouse (1921–2009), British saxophonist, opened the music shop Johnny Roadhouse Music in 1955 on Oxford Road.
- Catherine Chisholm, general practitioner and paediatrician: the first woman to study medicine at Manchester Medical School, practised in Oxford Road and was medical officer of the Manchester High School for Girls in Dover Street, 1908–38. She retired in 1948 having founded the Manchester Babies' Hospital (afterwards the Duchess of York Hospital) in 1914. Originally this was in Chorlton-on-Medlock but soon moved to Levenshulme and then to Burnage.
- Arthur Delaney (1927–1987), artist, was born at 30 Clifford Street, Chorlton-on-Medlock. He was inspired by the work of L. S. Lowry and the memories of the happy years he spent as a boy in the Manchester of the 1930s with its smoke-laden skies, rattling trams and gas lamps.
- Eugene Halliday (1911–1987), artist, founder of the Institute for the Study of Hierological Values (now Eugene Halliday Society), lived as a child in Chorlton-on-Medlock. He studied at the Manchester School of Art in All Saints (see Landmarks above). A prolific writer, during the mid-1950s he wrote for the Cavendish Magazine, published by the Congregational Chapel on Cavendish Street, Chorlton-on-Medlock (see Religion, above).
- Emmeline Pankhurst, a founder of the British suffragette movement, lived in Nelson Street, Chorlton-on-Medlock, following her husband's death; the house is now the Pankhurst Centre.
- Ellen Wilkinson, Labour politician, Cabinet minister, was born here at 44 Coral Street in 1891. In 1913 she graduated from the University of Manchester, Oxford Road.
- L. S. Lowry, artist, attended Manchester School of Art in Chorlton-on-Medlock in 1905 and studied under Pierre Adolphe Valette.
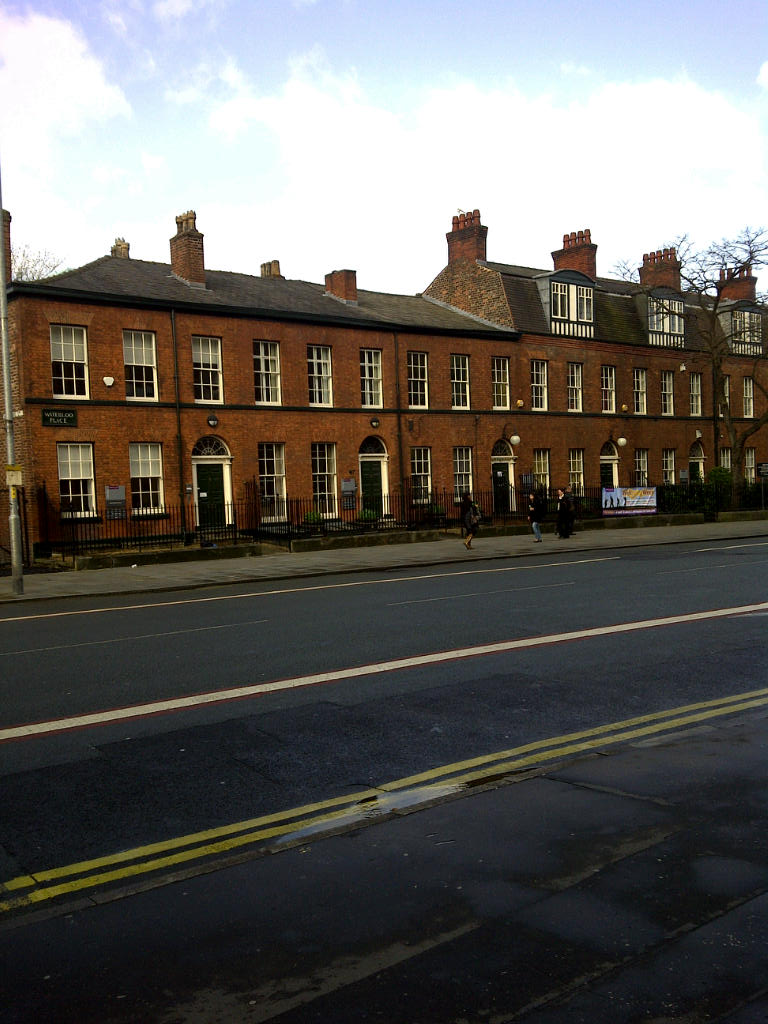
Waterloo Place, 176-188 Oxford Road

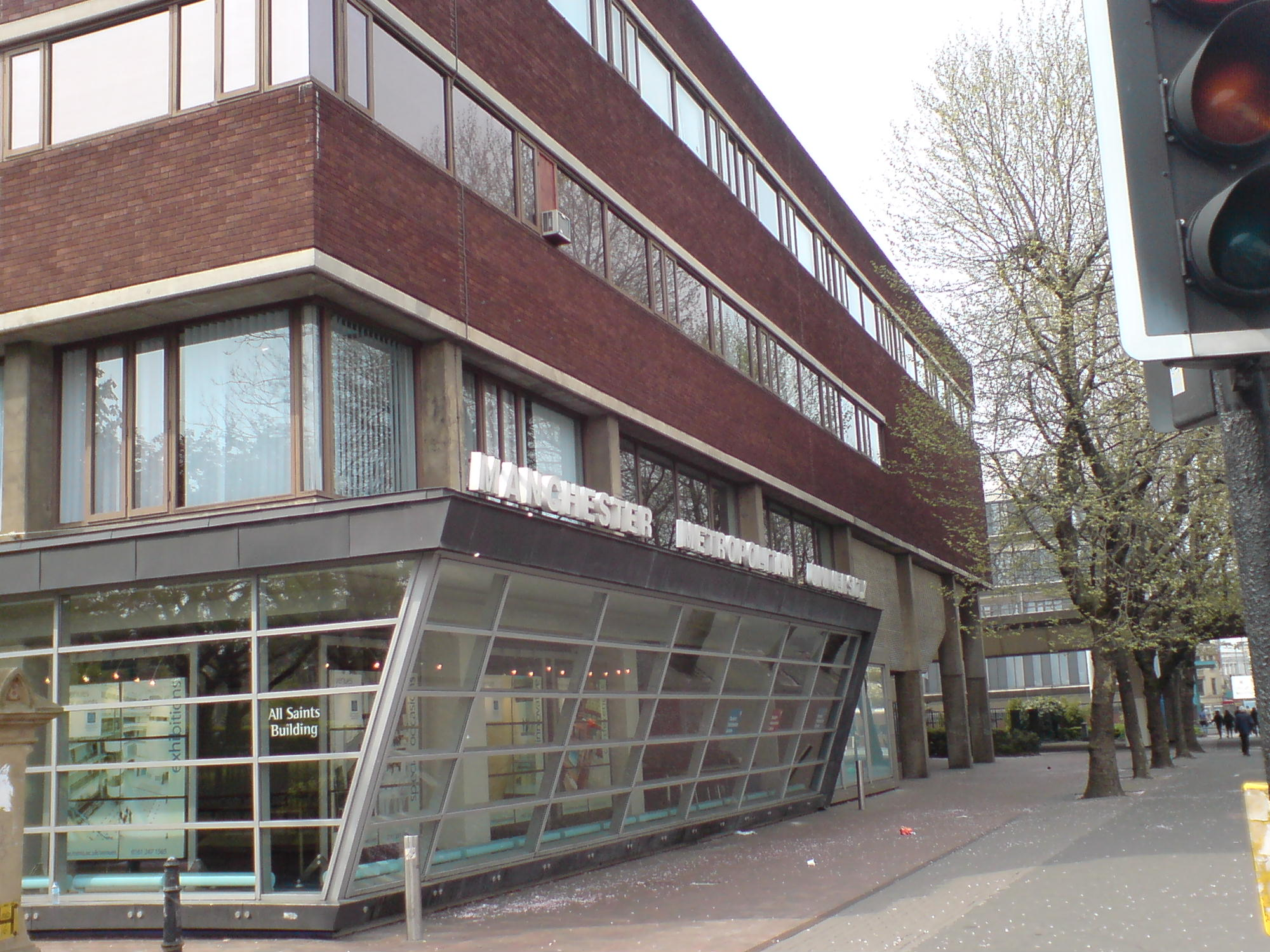
The All Saints Building on the Manchester Campus of the Metropolitan University

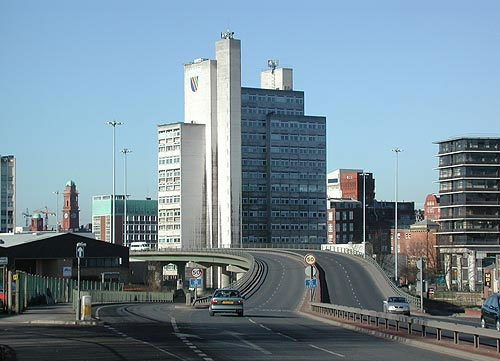
A view of the Mancunian Way elevated motorway near what was UMIST campus

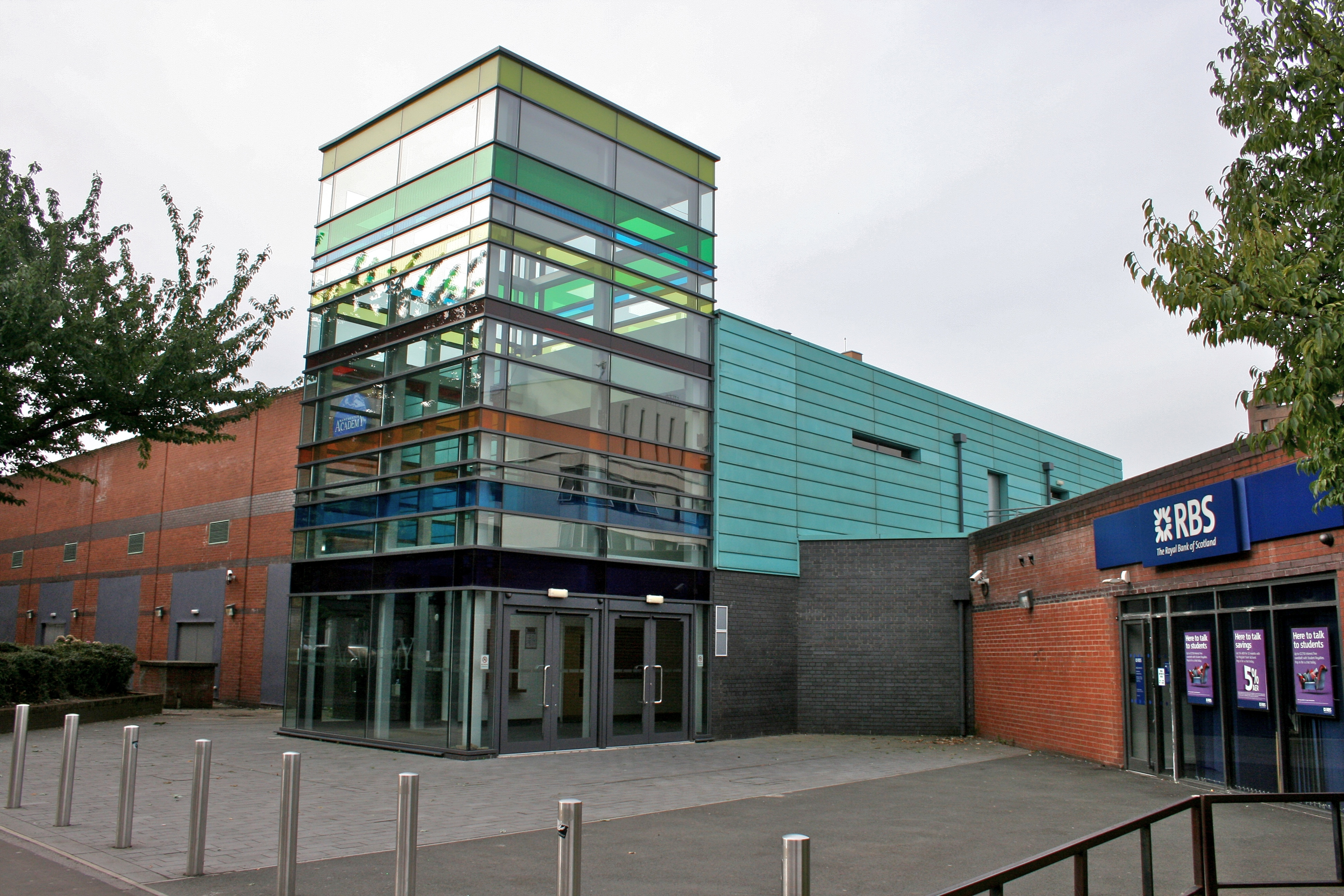
Manchester Academy, south of University of Manchester Students' Union, Oxford Road

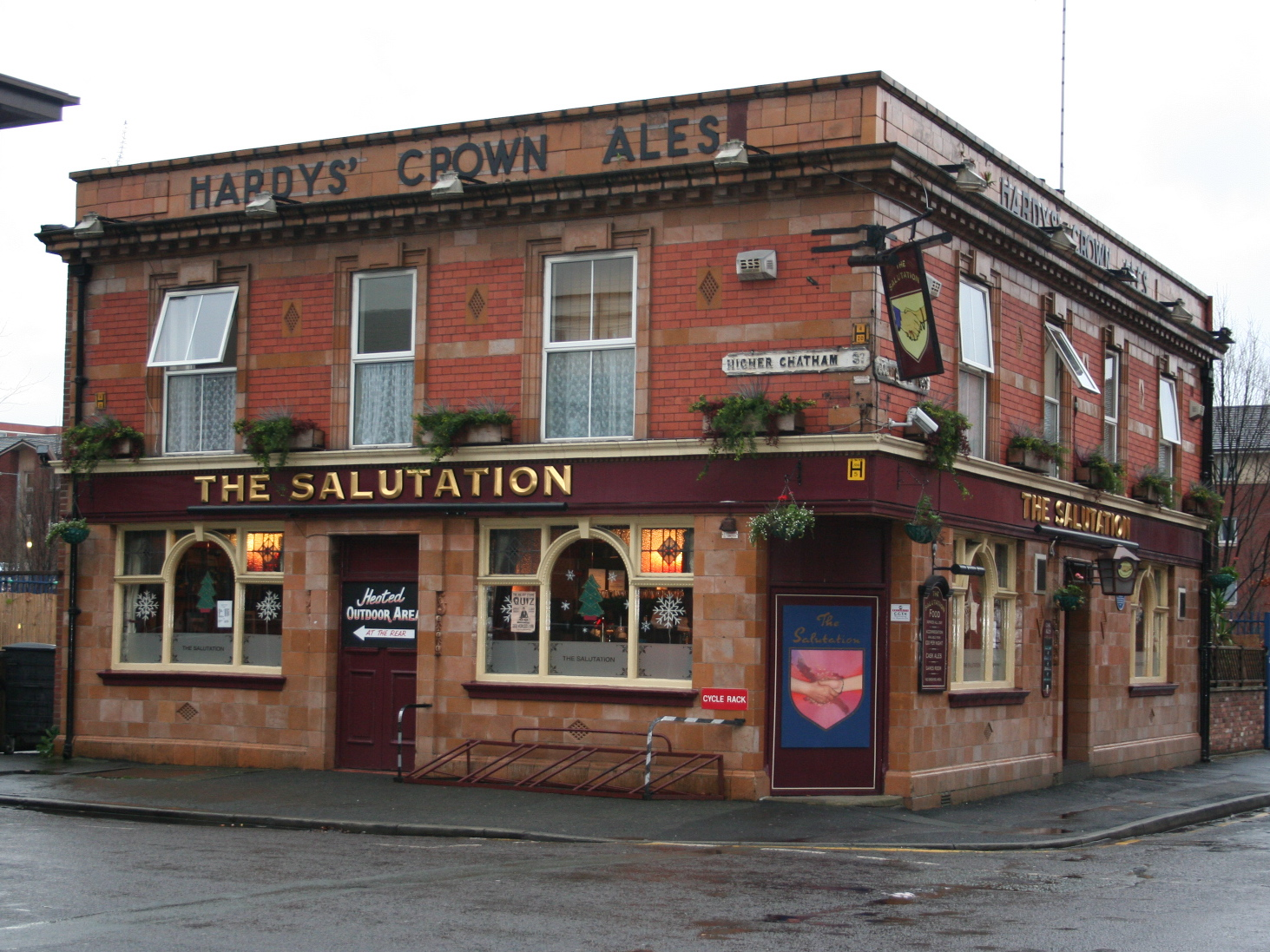
The Salutation public house in Higher Chatham Street

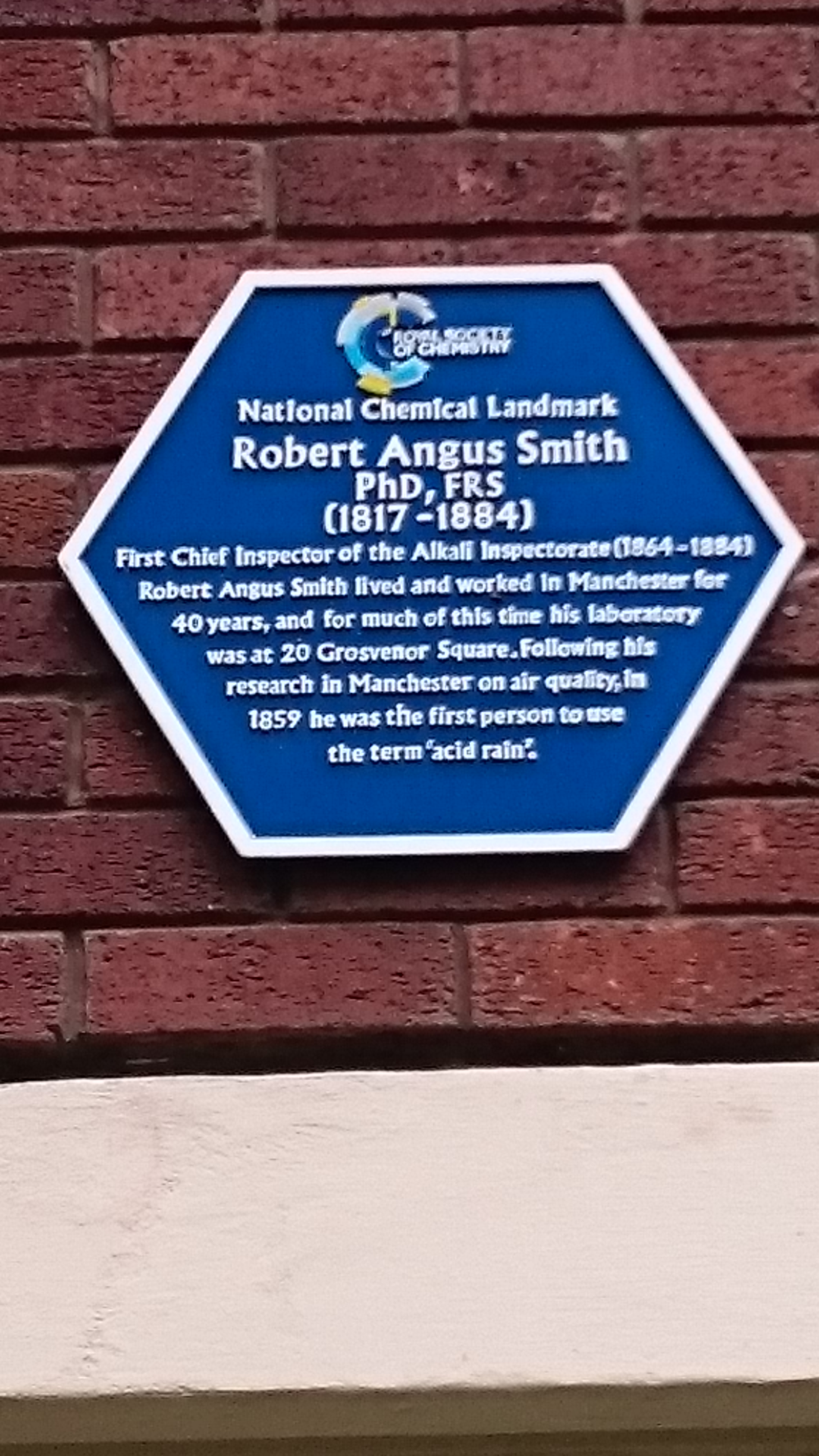
A Royal Society of Chemistry Blue plaque commemorating Smith in Grosvenor Square, the site of R. Angus Smith's laboratory

== See also ==
- Listed buildings in Manchester-M13
- Listed buildings in Manchester-M15
- New Broadcasting House (Manchester)
