= Armenia–United Kingdom relations =

- Armenia: United Kingdom

Diplomatic mission
- Embassy of Armenia, London: Embassy of the United Kingdom, Yerevan

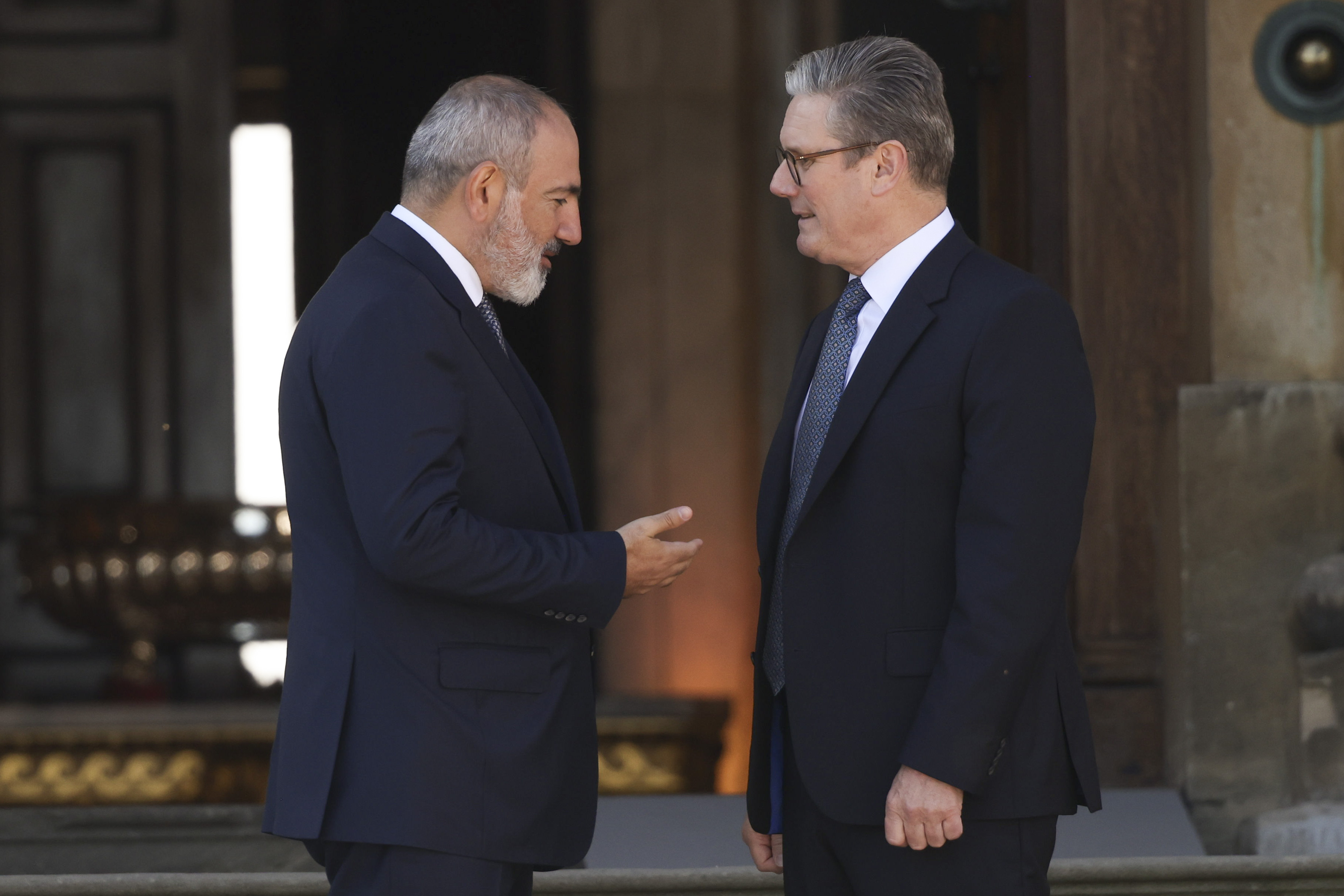
Armenian President Nikol Pashinyan with British Prime Minister Keir Starmer at a European Political Community summit in Blenheim Palace, July 2025.

Armenia–United Kingdom relations are the international and bilateral relations between Armenia and the United Kingdom of Great Britain and Northern Ireland. Armenia and the United Kingdom established diplomatic relations on 20 January 1992. Armenia has an embassy in London and the United Kingdom has an embassy in Yerevan. Both countries share common membership of the Council of Europe, the European Court of Human Rights, the International Criminal Court, the OSCE, the United Nations, the World Health Organization, and the World Trade Organization. Bilaterally the two countries have a Double Taxation Convention, an Investment Agreement, and a Strategic Partnership.

== History ==
=== 1890s ===
In the late 19th century, Armenia was divided between Russia and Turkey. Tensions began to escalate in Turkey in the 1880s and especially the 1890s, leading to a series of international crises that the British tried to help resolve by putting pressure on the Turkish government. Britain had long been a major friend of the Turkish government, helping it resist heavy expansionist pressure from Russia. In the 1880s, London pushed for reforms, with a special focus on better treatment of Christians across the Ottoman Empire. The Ottoman government resisted the pressures, and distanced itself from Britain. Instead, Constantinople turned increasingly to Germany for political, financial and commercial support, leading eventually to its entrance into the First World War as a German ally.

As atrocities mounted against Armenians in Turkey, British public opinion was outraged. London tried to coordinate a response from Britain, Russia, Germany, Austria and France. They were unable to agree on suitable sanctions or punishment; historians believe Turkey would have made concessions if threatened with an actual war. Germany wanted to help Turkey; Russia did not want to stir up its own large Armenian community; France wanted to restrict the British role in the region. William Gladstone, a leading Liberal then in retirement, called on Britain to intervene alone. The Liberal Prime Minister Lord Rosebery refused. The crisis weakened Roseberry, who resigned in June 1895. The crisis reached a violent peak in 1896, after bombings in Constantinople led to massive attacks on Armenians living in the city, with thousands murdered. Lord Salisbury, the new Conservative Prime Minister tried and failed to get the Powers to intervene. Nothing was done to help the Armenians.

=== First World War ===
British policy around 1910 stood in opposition to Russian control of Armenia, and tried to push the Ottoman Empire into improving its treatment of Armenians. When the World War erupted, Britain rejected the idea of forming an Armenian Legion to fight against the Turks. Instead it supported an Armenian Legion under French command that did fight in Cyprus.

As news of the Armenian Genocide emerged, London worked to demonstrate that its imperial responsibilities included the enforcement of human rights. The Turks responded with a heightened anti-British nationalism.

== State visits between Armenia and the United Kingdom ==
There are various state visits between Armenia and the United Kingdom the latest being the visit of the British State Minister of Europe David Lidington to Yerevan. Additionally President of Armenia Serzh Sargsyan visited the United Kingdom in July 2012.

Prime Minister Margaret Thatcher visited Armenia in June 1990 when it was part of the Soviet Union.

== Armenian genocide recognition ==
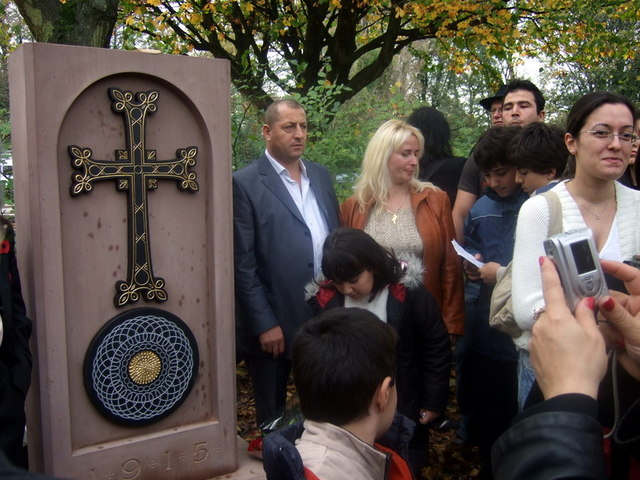
Armenian memorial unveiled in Cardiff in 2007.

The devolved governments of Wales and Scotland recognize the Armenian genocide, however the British government does not recognize the Armenian genocide, as it considers that the evidence is not clear enough to respectively consider "the terrible events that afflicted the Ottoman Armenian population at the beginning of the last century" genocide under the 1948 UN convention. The British government states the "massacres were an appalling tragedy" and condemns them stating that this was the view of the government during that period.

== Armenian community of the UK ==
According to Vered Amit's Armenians in London: The Management of Social Boundaries, published in 1989, around 10,000 Armenians were living in Greater London at the time. The majority were thought to be first-generation immigrants from Lebanon, Syria, Iraq, Iran and Cyprus. They also include Armenians from Ethiopia, India, Egypt, Israel, as well as individuals from other countries.

Manchester has been home to an Armenian population since 1835, with 30 Armenian businesses thought to have been operating in the city by 1862.

== Diplomatic missions ==
- Armenia maintains an embassy in London.
- The United Kingdom is accredited to Armenia through its embassy in Yerevan.
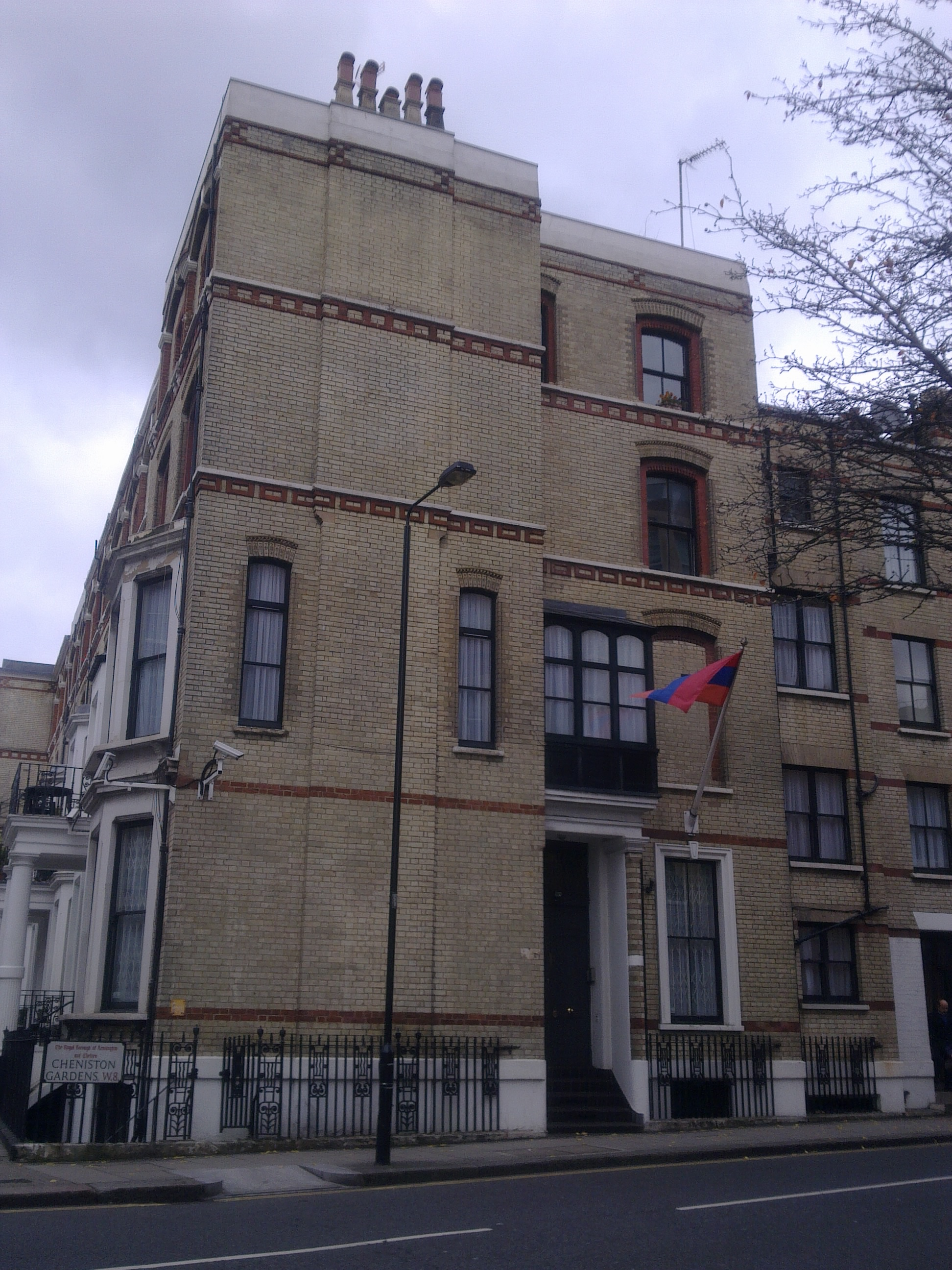
Embassy of Armenia in London

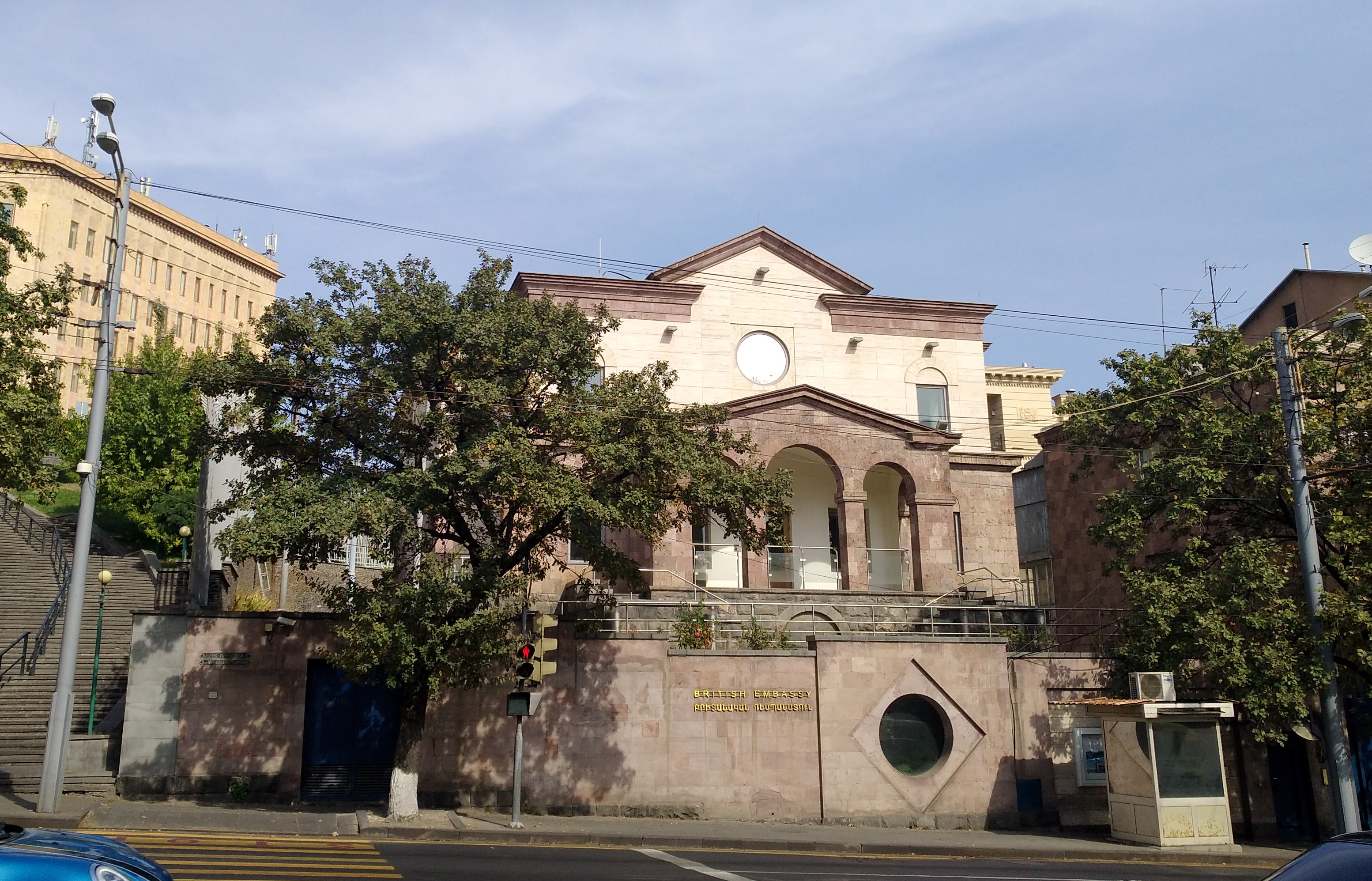
Embassy of the United Kingdom in Yerevan

== See also ==
- Foreign relations of Armenia
- Foreign relations of United Kingdom
- Armenia-NATO relations
- Armenians in the United Kingdom
- British in Armenia
