= Eddowes Bowman =

British dissenting tutor (1810–1869)

Eddowes Bowman (12 November 1810 – 1869), was a dissenting tutor.

Bowman was the eldest son of John Eddowes Bowman the elder and Elisabeth, his cousin, was born in Nantwich on 12 November 1810. He was educated chiefly at Hazelwood, near Birmingham, by Thomas Wright Hill, father of Sir Rowland Hill. The future postal reformer was his teacher in mathematics.

From school he passed to the Eagle foundry, Birmingham, where he improved himself in mechanical engineering. In around 1835, he became sub-manager of the Varteg ironworks, near Pontypool.

On the closing of the Varteg works in 1840, Bowman betook himself to study, graduated M.A. at Glasgow, and attended lectures in Berlin, acquiring several modern languages and mastering various branches of physical science.

In 1846, Francis W. Newman resigned the classical chair at the Manchester New College, having been elected to the chair of Latin at University College, London. Bowman was immediately appointed his successor at Manchester as professor of classical literature and history, and he held that post till the removal of the college to Gordon Square, London, as a purely theological institution, in 1853. To this removal he was strongly opposed.

Remaining in Manchester, though possessed of a sufficient independence, he gratified his natural taste for teaching by engaging in the education of girls.

For the study of astronomy he had built himself an excellent observatory. On optics and acoustics he delivered several courses of lectures at the Royal Manchester Institution and elsewhere.

From 1865, when the Owens scholarship was founded in connection with the Unitarian Home Missionary Board, he was one of the examiners.

He was a man of undemonstrative disposition, of wise kindness, and of cultured philanthropy. He died, unmarried, at Victoria Park, Manchester, on 10 July 1869. He was buried at Upper Brook Street Chapel, in Chorlton-on-Medlock.

== Selected publications ==
- Arguments Against the Divine Authority of the Sabbath … Considered, and Shown to be Inconclusive (1842), 8vo.
- Some Remarks on the Proposed Removal of Manchester New College, and its Connection with University College, London (1848), 8vo.
- Replies to Articles Relating to Manchester New College and University College (1848), 8vo. Reprinted (2010), by Nabu Press. ISBN 1-1497-1094-2
- On the Roman Governors of Syria at the Time of the Birth of Christ (anonymous, but signed B.) (1855), 8vo. (an able and learned monograph, reprinted from the Christian Reformer, October 1855, a magazine to which he was a frequent contributor).
