= Alexander Maclaren =

Scottish Baptist minister

The Reverend Alexander Maclaren
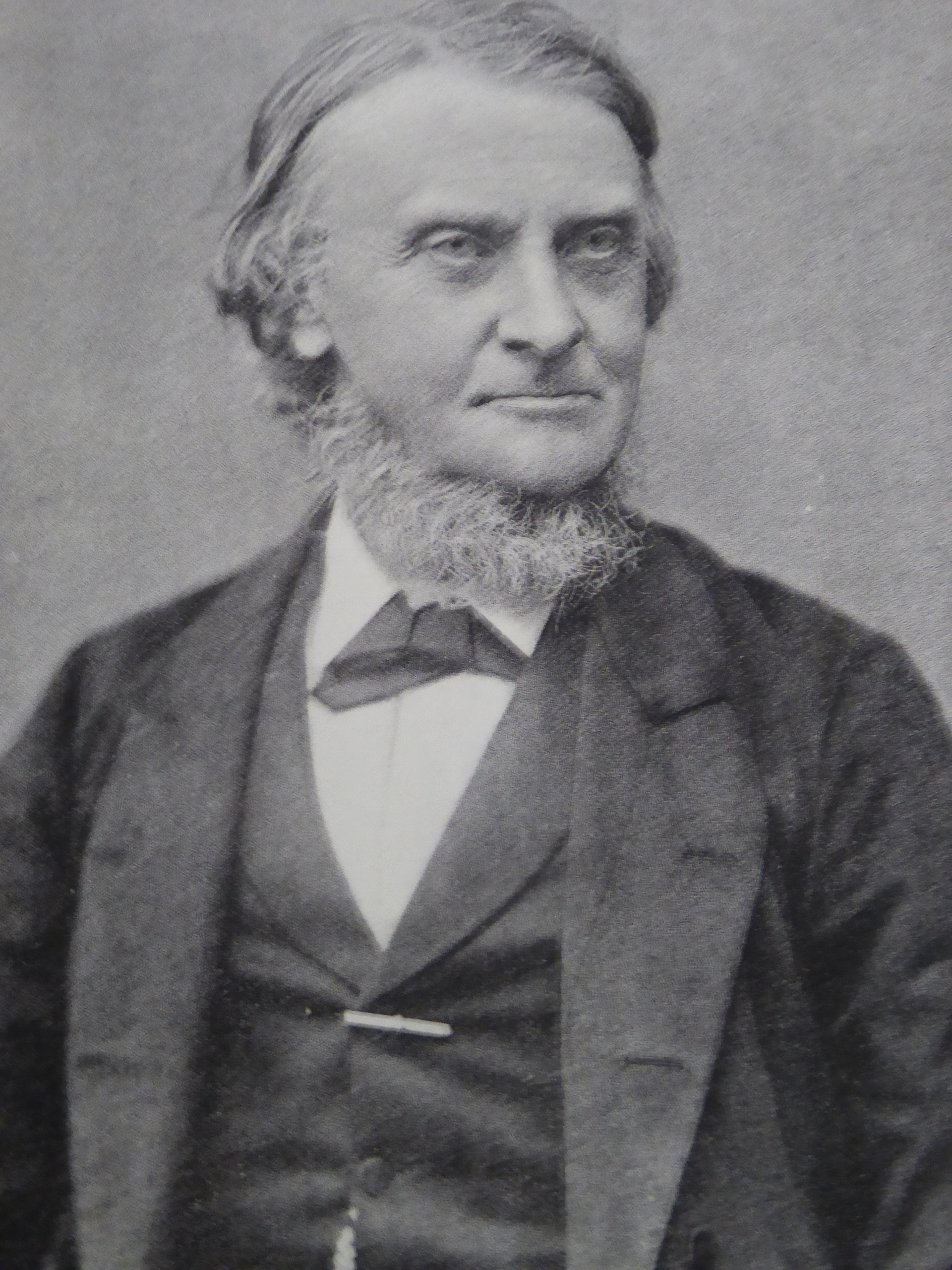
- Alexander Maclaren in 1889
- Born: 11 February 1826; Glasgow
- Died: 5 May 1910 (aged 84)
- Occupation: Baptist minister
- Children: Had at least two daughters

Alexander Maclaren (11 February 1826 – 5 May 1910) was a Scottish Baptist minister and writer. He was famous in his own day for his expository preaching, and became president of the Baptist Union. He is remembered today mainly for his bible commentaries, which are made up of collections of his sermons.

== Biography ==
Maclaren was born in Glasgow, Scotland, the son of David Maclaren, a merchant and Baptist lay preacher. His father went to Australia from 1837 to 1841 where he served as Resident Manager of the South Australian Company, leaving his family in Edinburgh. During his father's absence, Maclaren was converted and publicly baptized into the fellowship of the Hope St. Baptist Church, Glasgow, some time between age 11 and 13. He was educated at the Glasgow High School and Glasgow University, and the family moved to London when his father returned from Australia.

Maclaren entered Stepney College in 1842 at age 16, a Baptist institution in London. He was heavily influenced by Dr. David Davies, an eminent Hebrew scholar, and became an enthusiastic student of Hebrew and Greek, among other subjects. He took his bachelor's degree at the University of London before he was 20, sitting for examinations for his arts degree and winning prizes in Hebrew and Greek. Besides his collegiate studies, he read widely in literature, being especially fond of the English poets. The following year, he commenced his ministry at Portland Chapel, Southampton. He worked there for 12 years and developed a reputation as an attractive and powerful preacher. After much solicitation from other congregations, he accepted an invitation to the pastorate of Union Chapel in Manchester, where he remained from 1858 until his retirement in 1903. During his ministry, the congregation built and relocated to Union Baptist Chapel, Oxford Road, Manchester, completed in 1869. He visited Australia and New Zealand in 1889 where he preached at major cities to large congregations, despite poor health.

Maclaren was twice president of the Baptist Union of Great Britain, and he was president of the Baptist World Congress in London in 1905. He received honorary degrees in divinity from both Edinburgh and Glasgow Universities. In 1896, the citizens of Manchester had his portrait painted for their art gallery, and the Anglican bishop of Manchester gave the address when the painting was presented. He said that few speakers had exceeded Maclaren "for profundity of thought, logical arrangement, eloquence of appeal, and power over the human heart". Many attempts were made to draw Maclaren from Manchester, but he remained there despite his dislike of the climate and the workload. In 1903, he was made pastor emeritus and retired from the active ministry.

== Works ==
- Bible Class Expositions - The Gospel of Matthew
- The Expositor's Bible - The Psalms I to CL (1891–1894, 3 volume set)
- Expositions of Holy Scripture (1900)
- The Victor's Crown
- The Life of David As Reflected in His Psalms
- The Unchanging Christ
- The God of the Amen
- Leaves from the Tree of Life
- Last Sheaves
