= Labour Church =

- Classification: Unitarian Christian
- Scripture: Bible
- Theology: Unitarian Christian socialism
- Founder: John Trevor

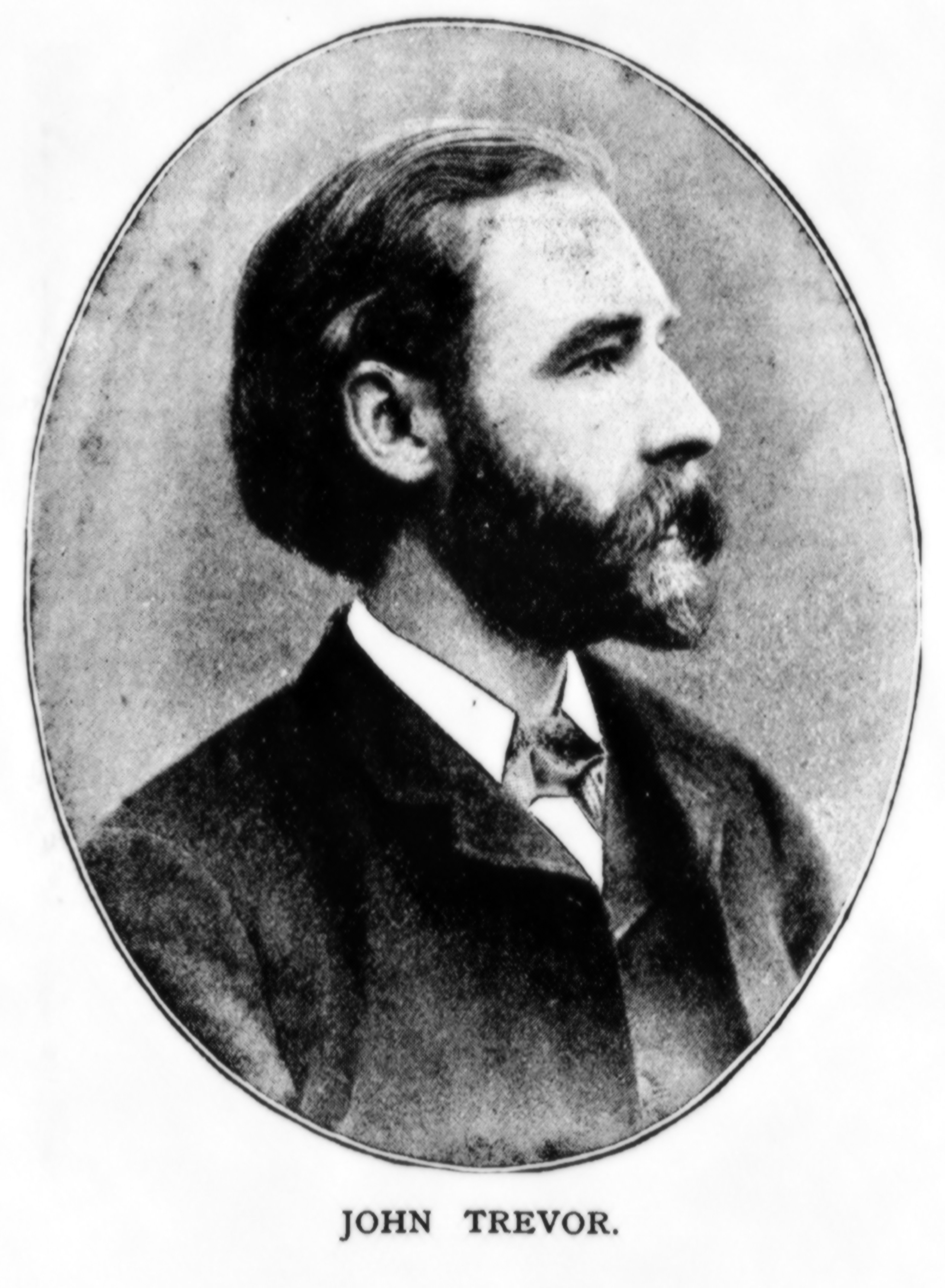
John Trevor (1855-1930) was a Unitarian minister who formed The Labour Church.

The Labour Church was an organization intended to give expression to the religion of the labour movement. It had a Christian socialist outlook, specifically called theological socialism.

== History ==
The first Labour Church was founded at Manchester in October 1891 by a Unitarian minister, John Trevor. Five principles were adopted. The service included the Lord's Prayer, hymns social in character, readings from Whitman, Emerson, Lamennais, Lowell, Whittier, Ruskin, Carlyle, and Maurice, and an address. In 1892 the Labour Prophet was started, and the Labour Hymn Book and tracts were published. It asserted that "improvement of social conditions and the development of personal character are both essential to emancipation from social and moral bondage, and to that end insists upon the duty of studying the economic and moral forces of society."

Soon the Church expanded to other towns including Birmingham, Bradford, Bolton, Leeds, London, Nottingham, Oldham, Plymouth and Wolverhampton. In July 1893, a Labour Church Union of 14 churches and 31 congregations was organized. In December 1893 the first Labour Church in the United States was opened in Essex County, Massachusetts. By the next November there were 24 churches. Some of these churches were formed in a direct response to another church, or church minister, in the town promoting liberal views. Within five years of the first Labour Church there were over 50. The Labour Churches were at that time attracting between 300 and 500 members to each congregation. The peak of the Labour Church in Britain was reached in 1895 with 54 congregations. In 1896 a Labour Church was founded in Australia at Melbourne by Archibald Turnbull, as well as a Socialist Church, based on the Labour Churches, being opened in New Zealand at Christchurch. By 1897 there were at least 4 Labour Churches in Massachusetts.

After John Trevor left in 1900, the Labour Church began to decline. At the annual conference of 1909, held in Ashton-under-Lyne, the name "Labour Church" was changed to "Socialist Church". However, by the beginning of World War I the recently renamed Church had disappeared.
