= Union Baptist Chapel, Oxford Road, Manchester =

Christian place of worship in Manchester

Coordinates: 53.4604°N 2.2273°W

Union Baptist Chapel was a Christian place of worship in the Fallowfield area of Manchester on the Oxford Road just north of York Place Road, opposite Whitworth Park. The congregation, founded in 1842, pre-dated the building, having previously met at a chapel just beyond Grafton Street. They called the accomplished Scottish minister, Alexander Maclaren, in 1858. The building was completed in 1869, and was often filled to capacity (1500) during his 45-year ministry. Jubilee celebrations were held in 1919 to celebrate 50 years of the building.

Union Baptist Chapel was badly damaged by bombing in 1940 during the Second World War. This led to the congregation holding shared meetings with Fallowfield Baptist Church from 1941. The two congregations eventually amalgamated in 1949 to form what is now Baptist Union Chapel, Fallowfield.
