= Baret Magarian =

English writer (born 1968)

Baret Magarian is a British-Armenian writer. He began his career as a freelancer, writing features for The Times, The Guardian, The Observer and New Statesman. He published his first novel, The Fabrications, in 2017.

== Early life and education ==
Magarian was born in Kensington, London, to Armenian Cypriot parents who had moved to England from Nicosia in 1960. His maternal grandfather Hovaness was the Armenian priest of Nicosia. Magarian studied English literature at University College, Durham.

== Works ==
In the short story Inferno, Magarian describes a father-son story and a time arc spanning 70 years in which the beginning and end are dominated by war.
