= Skin Traffik =

- Directed by: Ara Paiaya
- Written by: Adam Davidson
- Story by: Ara Paiaya
- Produced by: Ara Paiaya
- Starring: Mickey Rourke; Eric Roberts; Daryl Hannah; Michael Madsen; Jeff Fahey; Ara Paiaya; Gary Daniels; Dominique Swain; Alan Ford
- Music by: Sefi Carmel
- Distributed by: Sony Pictures Home Entertainment
- Release date: 13 October 2015 (United States)
- Running time: 97 minutes
- Countries: United Kingdom; United States
- Language: English
- Budget: 20M

Skin Traffik, also known as A Hitman in London, is a 2015 British-American action film starring Mickey Rourke, Daryl Hannah, Eric Roberts, Michael Madsen, Jeff Fahey, Gary Daniels, Ara Paiaya, Dominique Swain and Alan Ford.

== Plot ==
When a jaded former hitman encounters a savage pimp and a desperate woman under his control, he embarks on a quest to save a young girl from the clutches of the brutal gangsters who trade human beings as currency.

== Cast ==
- Gary Daniels as Bradley
- Mickey Rourke as Vogel
- Eric Roberts as The Executive
- Daryl Hannah as Zhanna
- Michael Madsen as The Boss
- Ara Paiaya as "X"
- Dominique Swain as Anna Peel
- Alan Ford as Paul Hamilton
- Jeff Fahey as Jacob Andries

== Production ==
The film was shot in Los Angeles, Vancouver, London, Amsterdam, Scotland.
