= Robert Istepanian =

Robert S. H. Istepanian is a visiting professor at the Faculty of Medicine, Institute of Global Health Innovation, Imperial College, London. Istepanian is widely recognized as the first scientist to coin the phrase m-Health. In 2012, Istepanian coined the new term 4G Health which is defined as "The evolution of m-health towards targeted personalized medical systems with adaptable functionalities and compatibility with the future 4G networks."

== Life ==
He completed his studies and obtained his PhD from the Electronic and Electrical Engineering Department of Loughborough University, UK in 1994. Since then he held several academic and research academic posts in UK and Canada including a professorship of Data Communications for healthcare and the founding and director of the Mobile 'Information and Network Technologies Research Centre' (MINT) at Kingston University, London (2003-2013). He was also a visiting professor in the Division of Cellular and Molecular Medicine at St. George's University of London (2005–2008). His other academic tenures included senior lectureships in the University of Portsmouth and Brunel University in UK and was also an associate professor in the Ryerson University, Toronto and adjunct professor in the University of Western Ontario in Canada.

Professor Istepanian served as the vice chair of ITU's focus group on standardization of Machine to Machine (M2M) for e-health service layer applications. He also served on numerous experts panels for global national awarding grant bodies including:

- Experts forum members - World leading diabetes expert's forum, International Diabetes Federation- IDF, World Diabetes Congress’, Dubai, 4–8 December 2011.

- Expert Committee and evaluation panel member the Finnish Strategic Centres of Science, Technology and Innovation (SHOK) on advances on wellbeing programme, Finnish Academy of Science, Sept. 2012.
- Experts Committee and panel member for the Joint Dutch government (STW) and Philips partnership programme on ‘Healthy Life Style Solutions, 2011.
- Experts Committee member- Canada Foundation for Innovation's (CFI) of large scale strategic and leading edge projects for health services in Canada, 2009.
- Expert Member of the Experts Panel and Reviewer of Ireland’s large scale strategic projects - Science Foundation Ireland SFI- Strategic Research Cluster Grants, 2008–2011.

He is investigator and co-investigator of many EPSRC and EU research grants on wireless telemedicine and other research /visiting grants from the British Council and Royal Society and the Royal Academy of Engineering. He was also the UK lead investigator of several EU -IST and e-Ten projects in the areas of mobile healthcare (m-health), including OTELO project (IST -2001-32516- 2001-04) and C-MONITOR (eTen- Contract C27256) on Chronic Disease Management (2002–04) and e-Dispute (2004–06).

Professor Istepanian is a Fellow of the Institute of Engineering Technology (Formerly IEE) and Senior Member of the IEEE. He currently serves on several IEEE Transactions and international journals’ editorial boards including IEEE Transactions on Information Technology in Biomedicine, IEEE Transactions on NanoBioscience, IEEE Transactions on Mobile Computing and International Journal of Telemedicine and Applications. He has also served as guest editor of three special issues of the IEEE Transactions on Information Technology in Biomedicine (on seamless mobility for healthcare and m-health systems, 2005) and IEEE Transactions of NanoBioScience (on Microarray Image Processing, 2004). Professor Istepanian is currently the co-chair of the ITU working group on M2M service layer standardization of e-health applications.

He was the co-chairman of the UK/RI chapter of the IEEE Engineering in Medicine and Biology in 2002. He also served on numerous technical committees, expert speaker and invited keynote speaker in several international conferences in UK and USA and Canada including, the Harvard and Partners Telemedicine conference on ‘Optimising Care Through Communication Technologies’ (Boston-2005) and the second International Conference on Smart homes and health Telematics, ICOST (Singapore-2004) and the ‘Building on Broadband Britain’ Conference (London-2005). He also presented papers and chaired sessions/tracks on several national and international IEEE conferences in these areas including the Telemed conferences of the Royal Society of Medicine, London, IEEE- Engineering in Medicine and Biology International Annual Conferences (IEEE-EMBS 97, 98, 99, 06), the 2000 World Medical Congress, Chicago all in the areas of mobile E-health systems. He was on the technical committee of the IEEE HealthComm International Workshops (Nancy, France 2002),(Los Angeles, 2003) and (Seoul, 2005) He was also the co-chair of the Technical Committee of the IEEE-EMBS Conference on Information Technology and Applications in Biomedicine (ITAB) in Birmingham, UK, 24–26 April 2003. He was also on the technical committee of the International Congress of Medical and Care Compunetics- ICMCC (La Hague, 2004 and 2005). Most recently, Professor Istepanian has been presenting several keynote lectures worldwide including:

== Lectures ==
- Keynote lecture: The Role of Emerging Wireless and Network Technologies for Personalized Healthcare Systems, MERCK - Diabetes and Obesity Therapeutic Expert Forum, Philadelphia, 30 April – 2 May 2010.
- Keynote lecture: 4G Health- The long term evolution of m-health: The case of enhanced mobile Diabetes management in the Middle East, Mobile Healthcare Track, 15th Annual Middle East World Teleco World Summit, 30 November – 1 December 2010, Dubai, UAE, 2010.
- Keynote lecture: Long Term E-health Evolution and Its Impact on Optimising Healthcare. Presented at IET Assisted Living 2009 Conference, London, 24–25 March 2009
- Keynote lecture: Intelligent RFID (i-RFID) Technologies for m-health applications, 3rd RFID Spanish Conference, Bilbao, Spain 25–27 November 2009.

He has been an invited lecturer and expert panellist for several conferences, symposiums and workshops including:

- Speaker and invited panellist: ‘ Industry panel discussion: How can accessibility for health/wellness be best built in at source’, Mobile health Industry Summit, 21–22 September 2010, London.
- Speaker and invited panellist: ‘ Embedded Connectivity for healthcare applications’, Embedded Connectivity Conference, 26–27 January 2010, London.
- Speaker and invited panellist: ‘Globalising Mobile Healthcare; Wireless Broadband Technologies for mobile healthcare services’, Mobile healthcare Industry Summit, 1–2 December 2009, London.
- Invited speaker: ‘WiMAX for Mobile Healthcare Applications’, IET WiMAX 2007 Conference, London, 25–26 April 2007.
- Invited speaker: ‘The Potential of Emerging Wireless Healthcare Systems for NHS Services ’, IET- London, Kingston Section Lecture, Kingston upon Thames, 6 November 2007.
- Invited speaker: ‘Talking Health: The Role of Bio-Communications in emerging personalised mobile healthcare Systems’, IET- Solent Lecture, University of Southampton, 15th, March 2007.
- Distinguished Speaker in BioEngineering: The Role of Genomic Signal Processing on Personalised Healthcare’, Institute of Biomaterials and Biomedical Engineering, University of Toronto, 29 April 2009.
- Invited speaker, ’Wikinomic Health: The role of emerging communication and computing Technologies for Personalisd Healthcare Systems’, Waterloo Institute for Health Informatics Research’ University of Waterloo, Canada, 17 September 2008
- Invited speaker: ’Opportunities and Challenges in Using Mobile WiMAX for healthcare’, 6th. Annual Wireless Healthcare Summit, Toronto, Canada, 22 September 2008.

He has published more than 200-refereed journal and conference papers and edited three books including chapters in the areas of biomedical signals processing and mobile communications for healthcare and m-health technologies.

Professor Istepanian was awarded the IEE ‘Heaviside Premium Award’ for best IEE Control Theory and Applications proceedings paper in 1999. This work was from the research work on finite-precision control theory funded by the Royal Society, London.

In 2010, Istepanian won IEEE Transactions on Information Technology in Biomedicine, 2009 Outstanding Paper Award for his paper called 'Introduction to the Special Section on M-Health: Beyond Seamless Mobility and Global Wireless Health-Care Connectivity'. This paper, published in IEEE journal Transactions on Information Technology in Biomedicine, December 2004, established a new research paradigm in this area and considered one of the most cited paper in the area.

During the Mobile Healthcare Industry Summit Middle East took place alongside the main Telco World Summit event in Dubai in December 2010, Prof. Istepanian courted controversy with his presentation on "4G health: The Long Term Evolution of mobile health." Although Istepanian welcomed the advent of 4G, due to its all IP architecture and 100 Mbit/s throughput, which offers many opportunities for m-health in terms of diagnostics potential, he championed WiMAX as the enabler of mhealth services. He stated that "The telecom community will be fighting for LTE, while the mhealth community is advocating the use of WiMAX," he said. "There are many applications for which LTE will be useful, but I believe WiMAX will be a more viable infrastructure, especially for the developing world. Its performance is close to that of LTE and enough for 4G health applications."

== See also ==
- Telemedicine
