= Holy Trinity Armenian Church, Manchester =

Holy Trinity Armenian Church
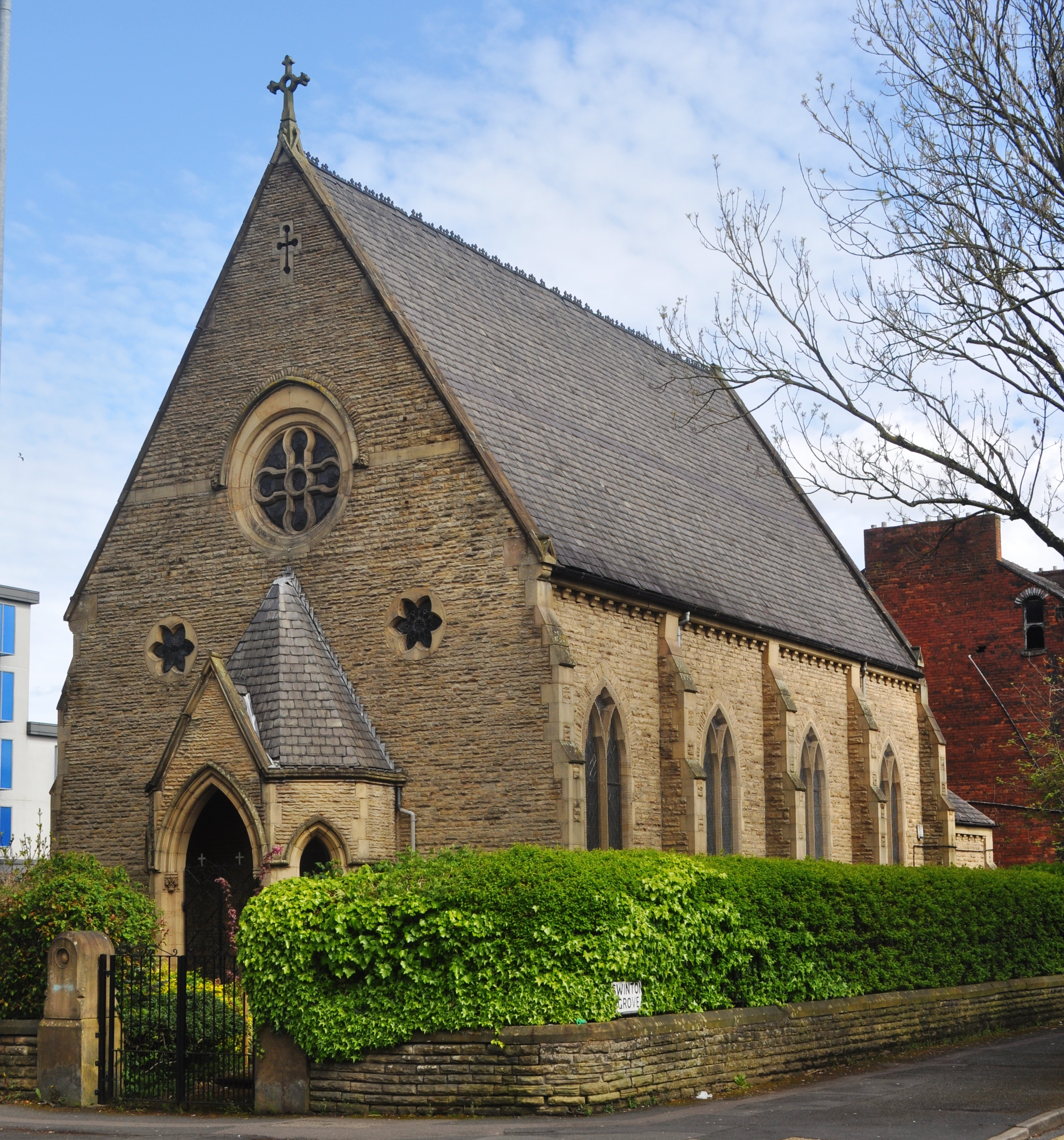
- Holy Trinity Armenian Church
- 53°27′45″N 2°13′24″W
- OS grid reference: SJ 85270 96211
- Location: Upper Brook Street; Manchester
- Country: England
- Denomination: Armenian Apostolic

History
- Dedication: 1870

Architecture
- Functional status: Active
- Heritage designation: Grade II
- Architect(s): Royle and Bennett
- Architectural type: Church
- Style: Neo-Gothic
- Construction cost: £2,725

Listed Building – Grade II
- Official name: Holy Trinity Armenian Apostolic Church and vicarage
- Designated: 16 May 2012
- Reference no.: 1401667

Holy Trinity Armenian Church is an Armenian Apostolic Church in the Chorlton-on-Medlock area of Manchester, England and a Grade II listed building. Consecrated in 1870, it is the oldest purpose-built Armenian Church in Western Europe.

== History ==
In the early 19th-century, a number of "well-educated and very wealthy" Armenian textile merchants, manufacturers and retailers were drawn to Manchester for its reputation as an "industrial and commercial centre". The first group arrived in 1835 and by 1862, the Armenian community had opened an estimated 30 businesses in the city. Many Armenians settled in the area around Upper Brook Street. Prior to the building of the church, the community rented a chapel.

In 1867, Vartabed Kiuroyan initiated plans for a purpose-built Armenian church and vicarage, collecting funds from dozens of sponsors. The church was designed in the neo-Gothic style by the architecture firm Royle and Bennett. Construction began in 1869 to the tune of £2,725. Holy Trinity Armenian Church officially opened and had its inaugural service on Easter Day in 1870.

The late Queen Elizabeth II wrote a letter acknowledging the church's 150 year anniversary in 2020.
