= John Trevor (Unitarian minister) =

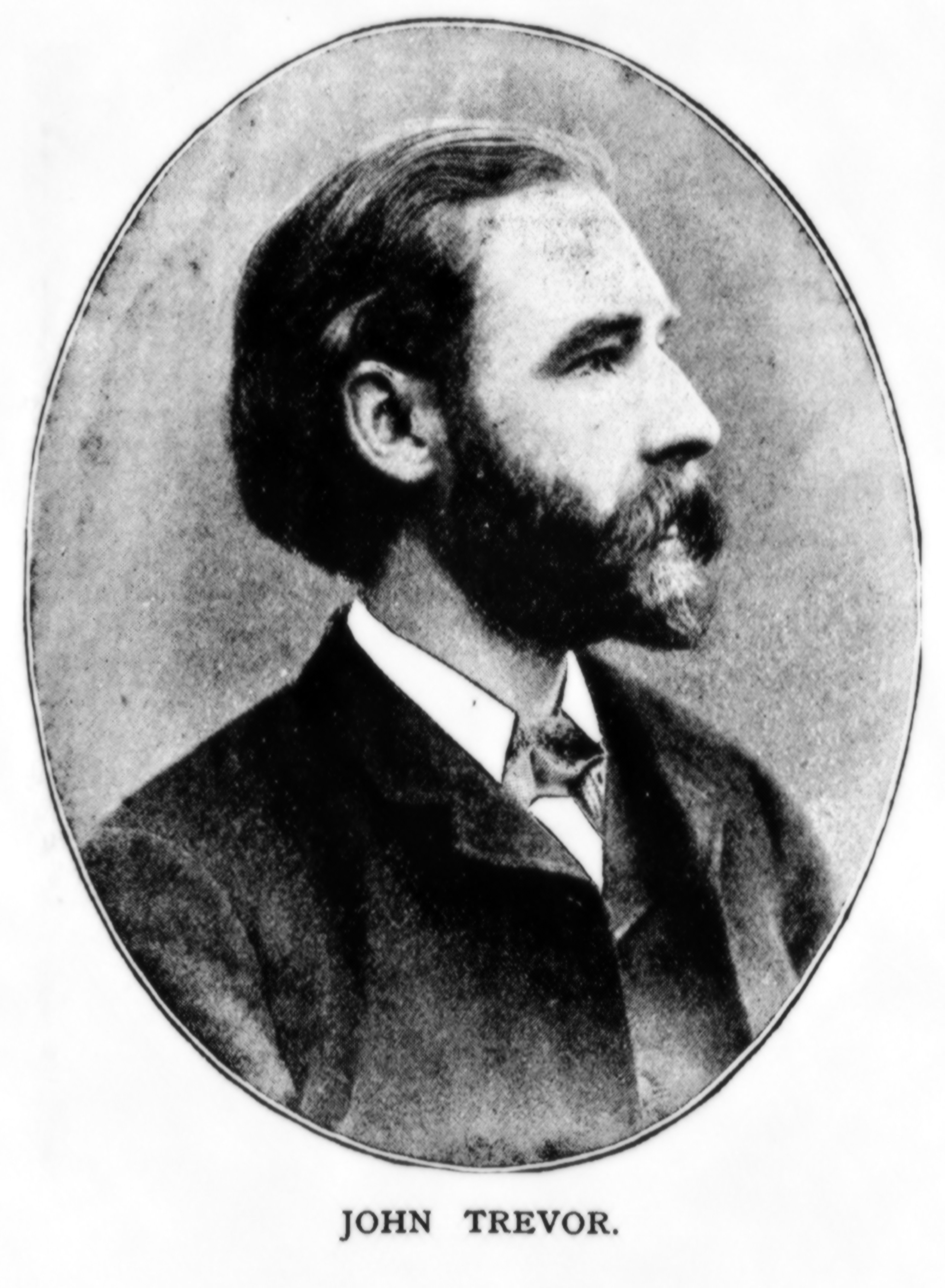
- John Trevor ca. 1895
- Installed: 1891
- Term ended: 1900

Personal details
- Born: 1855
- Died: 1930 (aged 74–75)
- Denomination: Labour church
- Occupation: Unitarian minister

John Trevor (1855–1930) was an English Unitarian minister and Christian socialist who formed The Labour Church.

== Early life ==
John was born in Liverpool; his mother died when he was still a child and he was raised by his maternal grandmother, a strict Johnsonian Baptist. He was converted by a Unitarian minister.

== Formation of the Labour Church ==
John Trevor formed The Labour Church in 1891 in Manchester. He left the Labour Church in 1900 and the Church never recovered from its loss and disappeared by World War I.

== Death ==
After a decade of increasing loneliness John Trevor died in 1930.

== See also ==
- Hewlett Johnson
- Camilo Torres Restrepo
