= Manchester Central (Salvation Army) =

Manchester Central corps
- Manchester Central corps
- 53.5°N 2.2°W
- OS grid reference: SD 86830 00383
- Location: Manchester
- Country: England
- Denomination: Salvation Army
- Website: www1.salvationarmy.org.uk/manchester

History
- Founded: 1879 (as Manchester Temple)

Clergy
- Pastor: Major Ray Ward

Manchester Central corps of the Salvation Army is the main Salvation Army church (corps) in the city of Manchester.

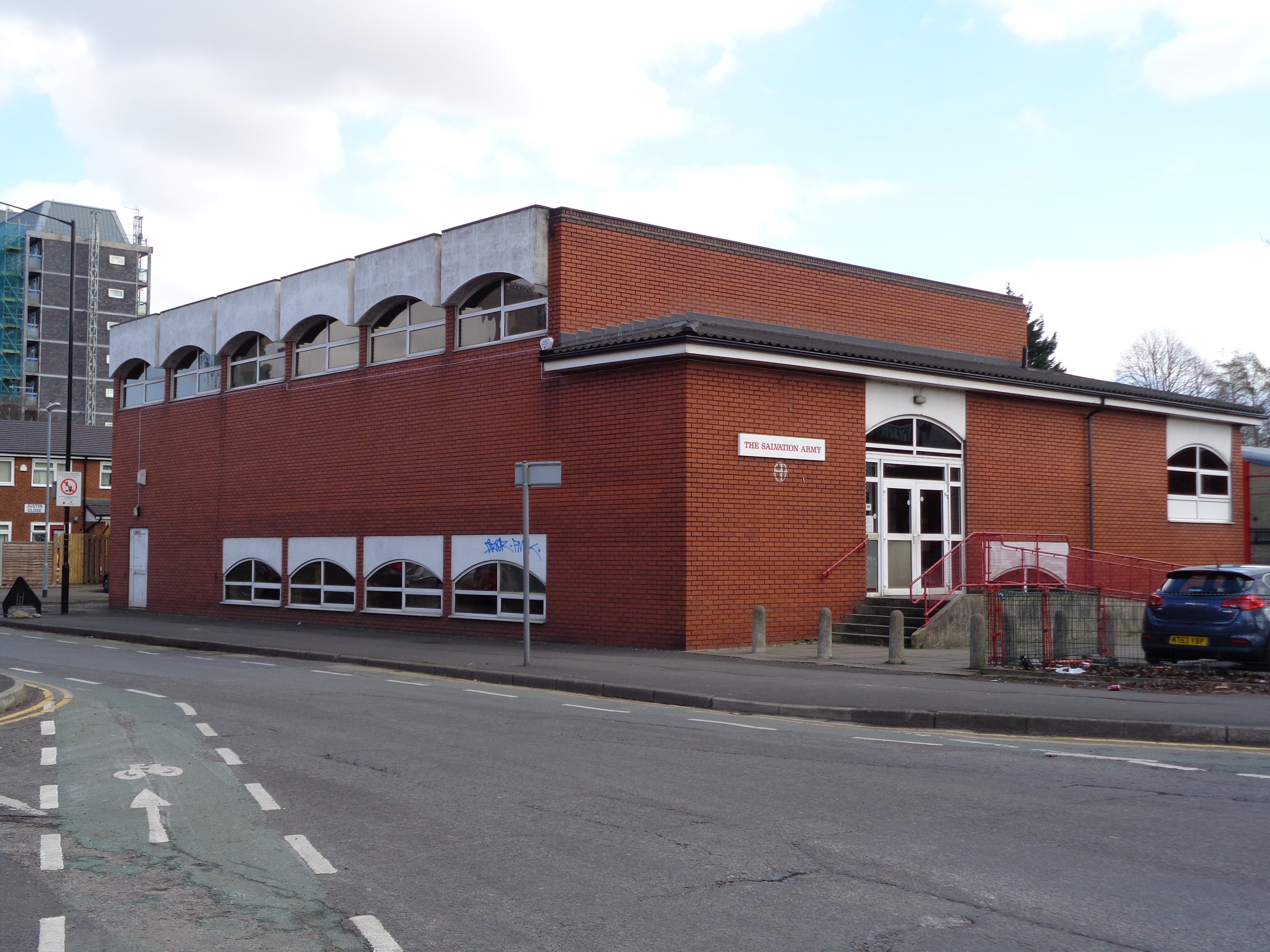
Manchester Central

Located on the University of Manchester campus, the corps has a strong African flavour with a number of the congregation coming from Zimbabwe, together with its Shona-speaking choir. Other nationalities worshiping there are/have included Zambian, Eritrean, Korean, Liberian, Italian, Namibian and Nigerian, as well as British members.

There is a strong outreach to students of the University of Manchester.
