= Ara Paiaya =

British film director

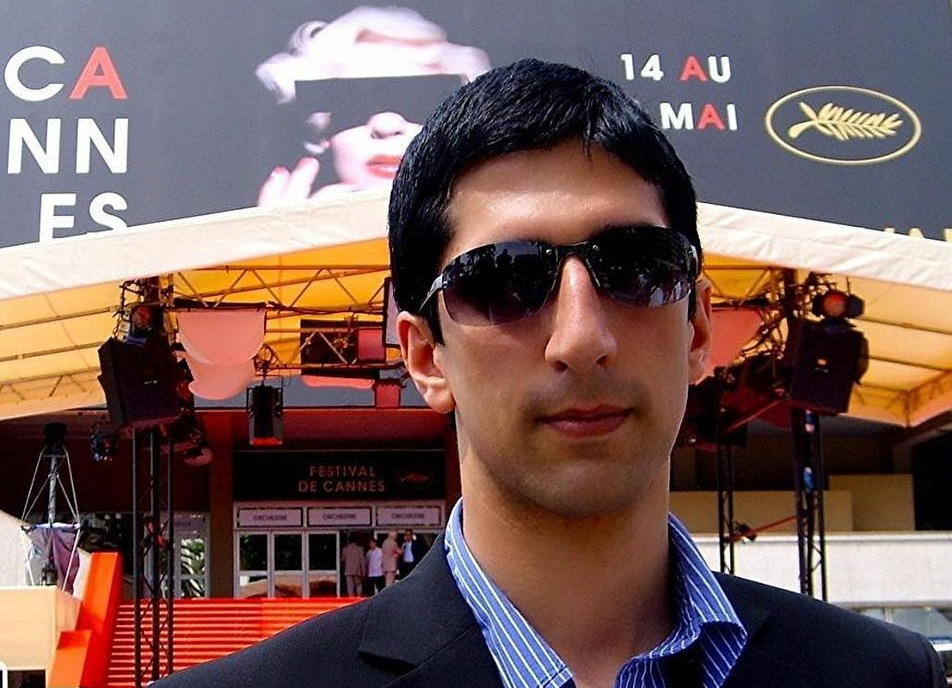
- Born: United Kingdom
- Known for: Producing, directing, acting
- Notable work: Skin Traffik, Instant Death, The Suppressor

Ara Paiaya is a film producer, director and actor.

Paiaya directed, produced, and co-starred in the Hollywood action feature film Skin Traffik. He also directed and produced the Hollywood action feature film Instant Death and the comedy feature film Purge Of Kingdoms.

== Filmography ==
| Year | Title | Role |
|---|---|---|
| 2001 | Dubbed & Dangerous | Director, producer, actor |
| 2003 | Dubbed & Dangerous 2 | Director, producer, actor |
| 2004 | Dubbed & Dangerous III | Director, producer, actor |
| 2005 | Night Driver | Director, producer, actor |
| 2006 | Death List | Director, producer, actor |
| 2008 | Maximum Impact | Director, producer, actor |
| 2011 | The Suppressor | Director, producer, actor |
| 2015 | Skin Traffik | Director, producer, actor |
| 2017 | Instant Death | Director, producer, actor |
| 2019 | Purge Of Kingdoms | Director, producer |
