= Demis Ohandjanian =

English footballer

Personal information
- Full name: Demis Armen Ohandjanian
- Date of birth: 1 May 1978 (age 48)
- Place of birth: United Kingdom
- Position: Striker

Senior career*
Years	Team	Apps	(Gls)
1996–19??	Middlewich Athletic		
19??–1997	Curzon Ashton		
1997	Doncaster Rovers	1	(0)
1997	Macclesfield Town	1	(0)
- Winsford United
- Mossley
- Caernarfon Town
- Stafford Rangers
- Flixton
- Woodley Sports
- Cheadle Town
20??–2003	Woodley Sports		
2003–2007	Abbey Hey		
- * Club domestic league appearances and goals

Demis Armen Ohandjanian (born 1 May 1978) is an English former professional footballer who played as a striker in the English Football League for Doncaster Rovers.

== Career ==
Ohandjanian joined Middlewich Athletic in time for the start of the 1996–97 season. He had a brief spell with Curzon Ashton before joining Doncaster Rovers in January 1997. He made just one league appearance for Rovers, playing as a substitute in their 2–0 defeat away to Northampton Town. Released, he joined Macclesfield Town in February 1997, scoring on his club debut as Macclesfield won 2–0 away to Morecambe in the Spalding Cup. In November 1997 he scored on his debut for Winsford United.

He later joined Mossley, scoring five times in 15 games during the 1998–99 and 1999–2000 seasons.

He went on to play for Caernarfon Town, Stafford Rangers, Winsford United, Flixton, Woodley Sports and Cheadle Town before rejoining Woodley Sports. In the 2003 close season he left Woodley Sports to join Abbey Hey.
