= David Bowman Schneder =

American missionary educator

David Bowman Schneder (March 23, 1857 – October 5, 1938) was an American missionary educator in Japan.

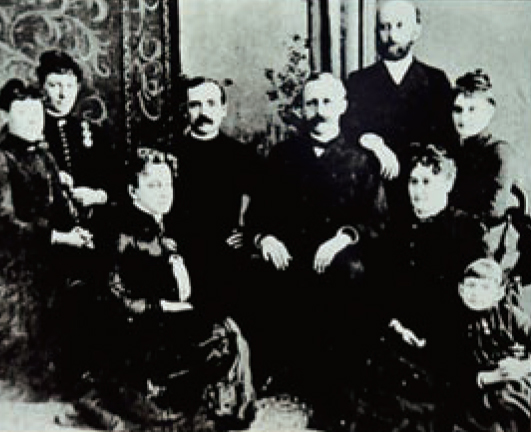
Seminarians in Sendai, 1888; Schneder is fourth from left

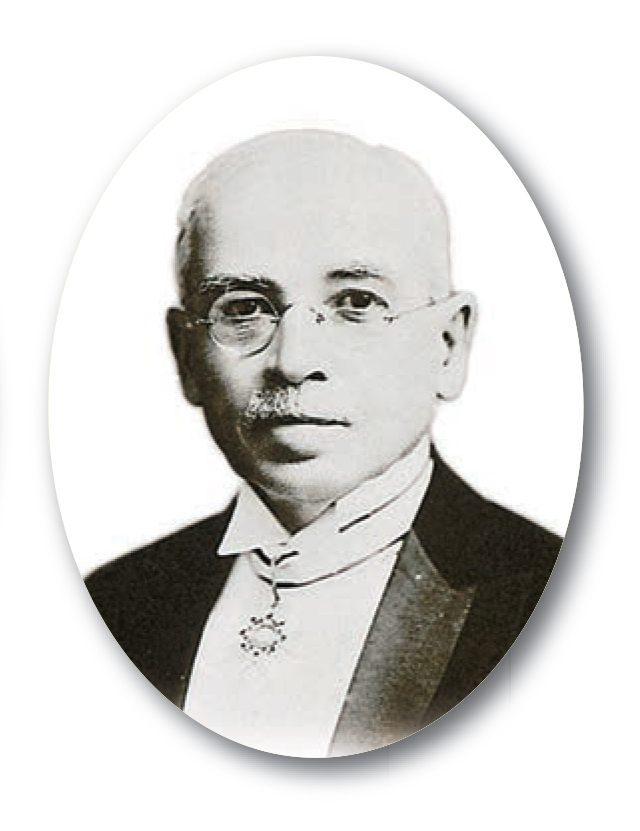
David Bowman Schneder

== Early life and education ==
Schneder, was born in Bowmansville, Pennsylvania, and graduated from Franklin and Marshall College in 1880. He graduated the Lancaster Theological Seminary 1883 and was ordained minister of the Reformed Church in the United States. He was a pastor in Marietta, Pennsylvania, from 1883-1887.

== Career ==
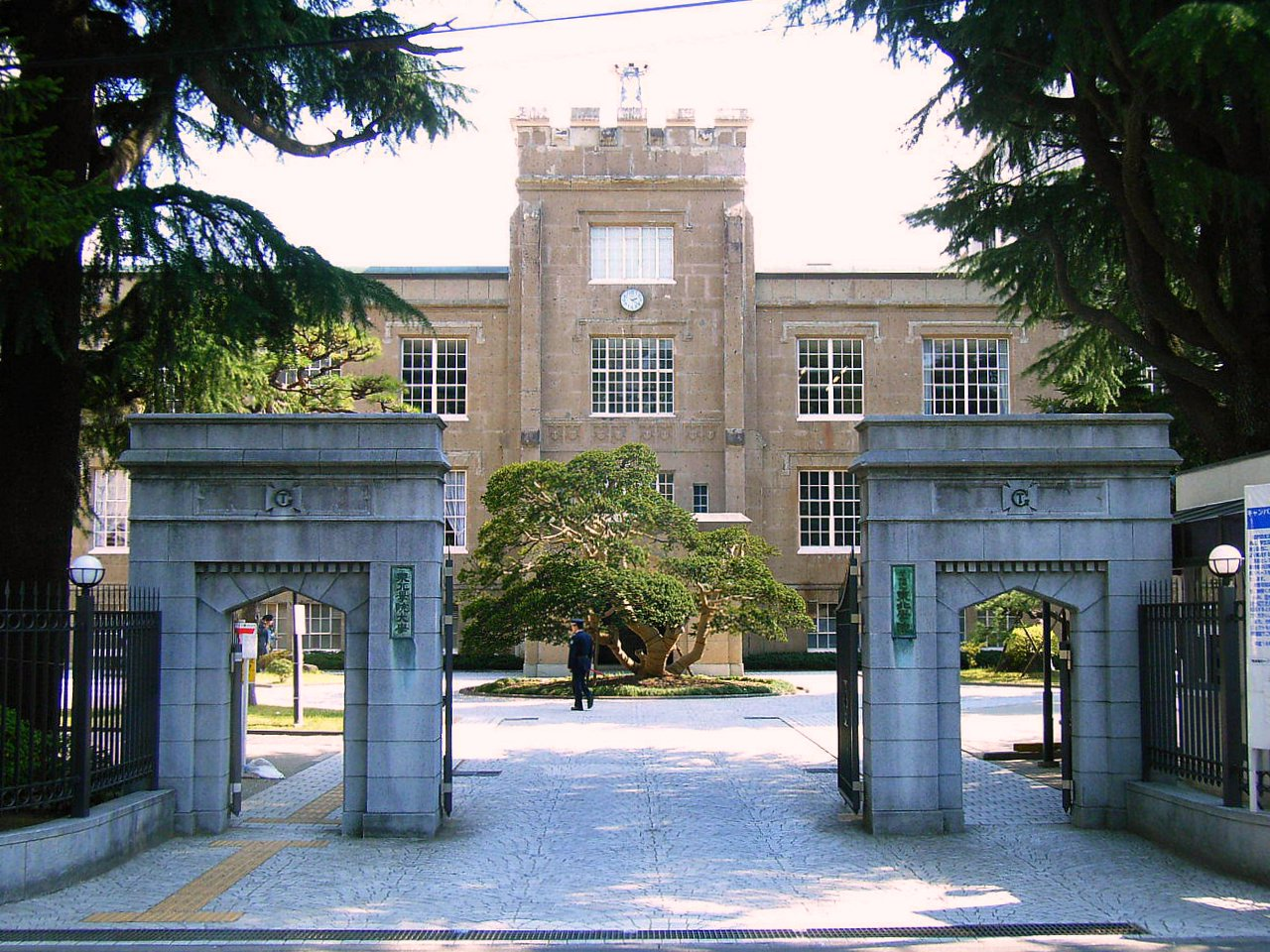
Tohoku Gakuin University

In 1887 he and his wife were appointed to serve as missionaries in Japan. He taught at the Sendai Theological Training School, founded in 1886; the school later became Tohoku Gakuin University. He was the second president in 1901 and served until 1936. During his 35 years as president, the school expanded, adding college courses with Departments of Theology, Teacher Training, Commerce and Liberal Arts. At a time when many missionaries regarded non-Christian religions as enemies, Schneder saw traditional religions of Japan, particularly Amida Buddhism, as preparations for the gospel. He is considered in the vanguard of his missionary generation for these ideas. Nevertheless, he never entered into dialogue with non-Christian religious leaders. A student of Buddhism, Schneder wrote Japanese Buddhism in 1899. He felt that the Buddhism of his time had lost some its early virtues and had become a cult of glitter and pomp to impress the vulgar mind. Schneder and his wife made seven trips to the U.S., "never ceasing in their labors to build international goodwill and raise money for the school's expansion." He retired in 1936, becoming President Emeritus, and was awarded his second Order of the Rising Sun for distinguished service to education. His final speech was entitled "Why I'm Not Ashamed of the Gospels." He stayed in Sendai after retirement and died in 1938.

In 1917, he was awarded Fourth Class Order of the Rising Sun by the Emperor "in appreciation of ... his efforts in the maintenance of friendly relations between Japan and America." He later tried to bridge the growing U.S.-Japan antagonisms that led to World War 2 by sharing Christian viewpoints on reconciliation with his many contacts, including presidents and prime ministers.

== See also ==
- Masayoshi Oshikawa
- William Edwin Hoy
