= Oshikawa =

Oshikawa (written: 押川) is a Japanese surname. Notable people with the surname include:

- Masayoshi Oshikawa (押川 方義, 1850–1928), Japanese Protestant missionary and educator
- Norikichi Oshikawa (押川 則吉, 1863–1918), Japanese politician
- Kiyoshi Oshikawa (押川 清, 1881–1944), Japanese baseball player
- Shunrō Oshikawa (押川 春浪, 1876-1914), Japanese writer, journalist and editor
