= Tohoku Gakuin University =

University in Sendai, Japan

Coordinates: 38°14′59″N 140°52′38″E

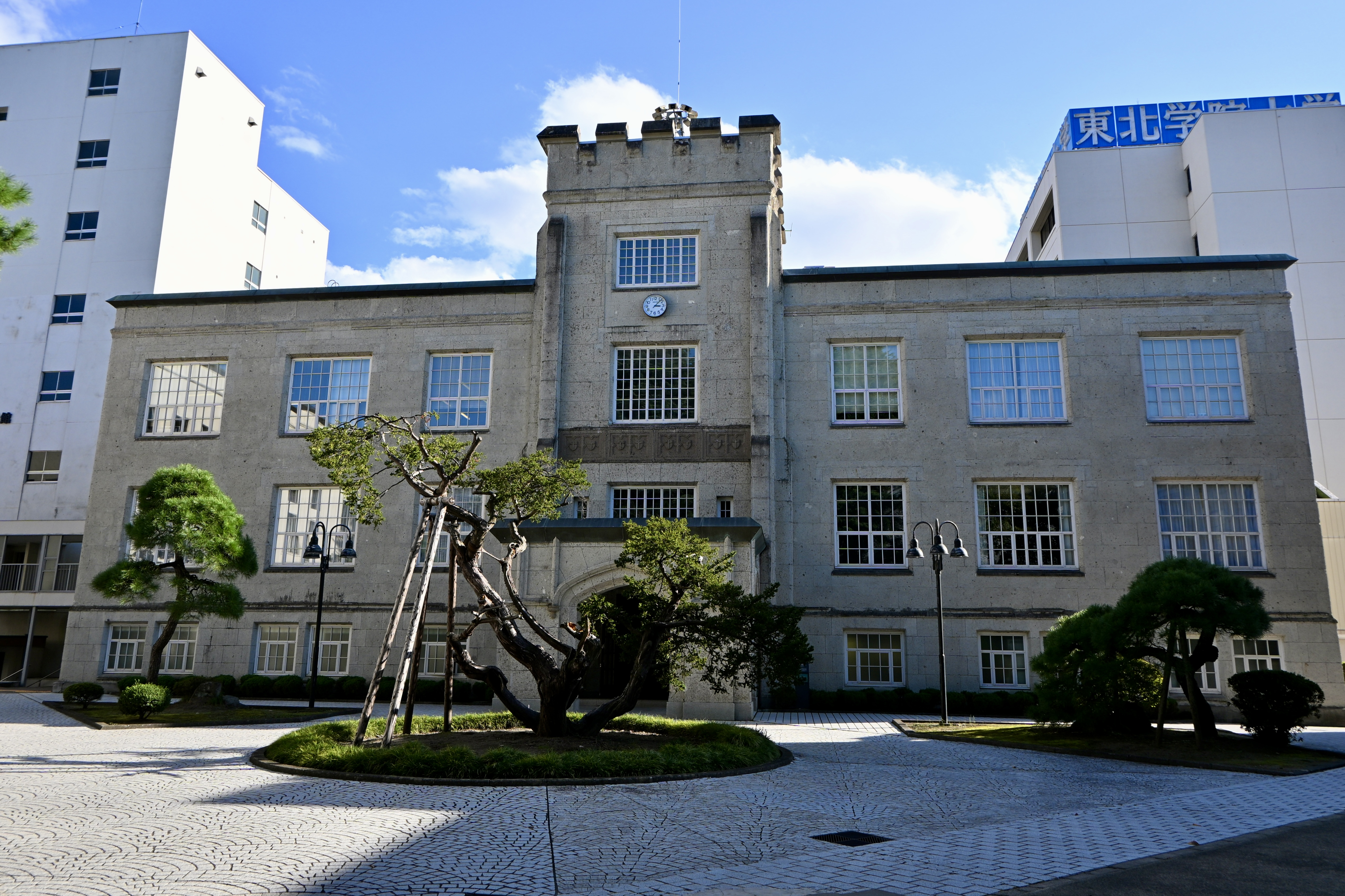
- The main building of Tohoku Gakuin University
- Motto: Life Light Love
- Type: Private
- Established: Founded 1886, Chartered 1949
- President: Haruki Onishi
- Faculty: 308 (2024)
- Administrative staff: 156 (2024)
- Undergraduates: 11,395 (2024)
- Postgraduates: 133 (2024)
- Location: Sendai, Miyagi, Japan
- Campus: Urban
- Colors: Sky-blue, blue
- Mascot: None
- Website: www.tohoku-gakuin.ac.jp/en/index.html

Tohoku Gakuin University (東北学院大学, Tōhoku Gakuin Daigaku; (TGU)) is a private university in Sendai, Miyagi Prefecture, Japan. It was founded in 1886 under the influence of the German Reformed Church missionaries. Miyagi Gakuin Women's University is its sister school.

== History ==
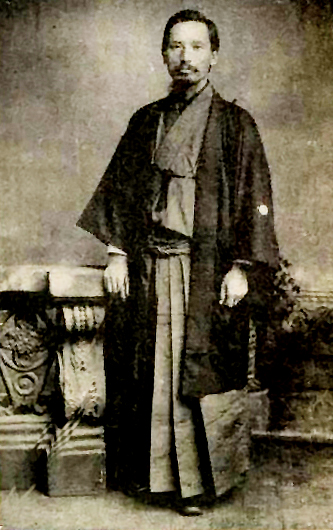
Masayoshi Oshikawa, cofounder of the University

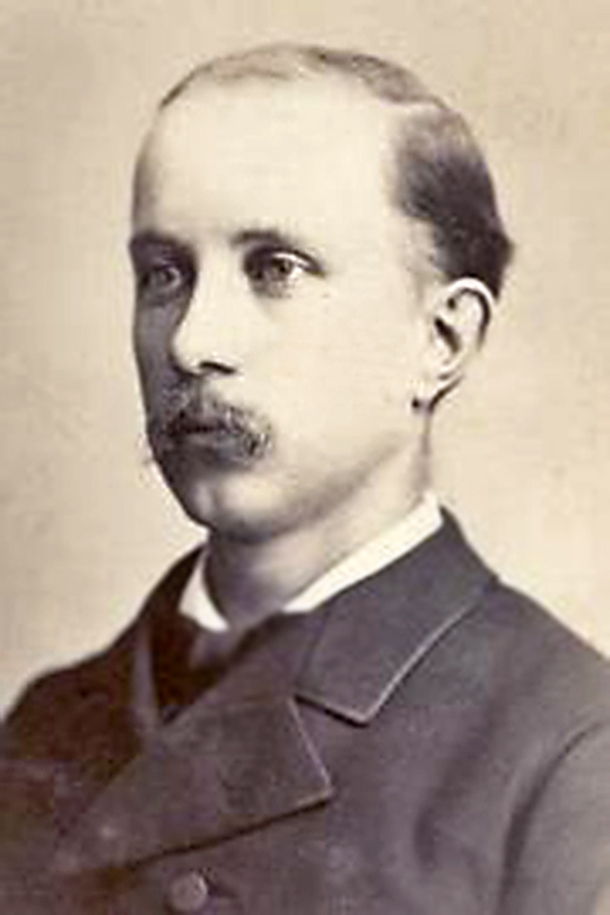
William Edwin Hoy, cofounder of the University

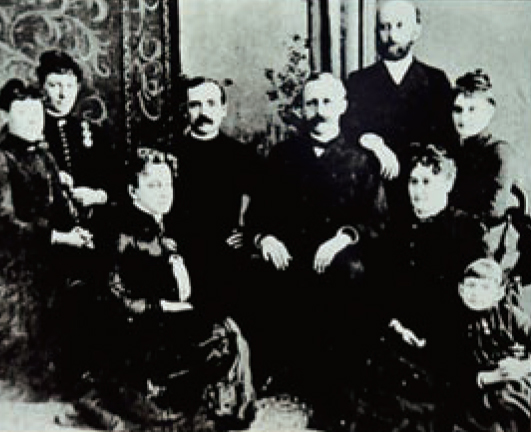
Seminarians in Sendai, 1888; Schneder is fourth from left

=== Founding ===
The university was founded in 1886 (Meiji 19) as Sendai Theological Seminary by Oshikawa Masayoshi (1850–1928), one of Japan's first Protestants, and Protestant missionary William Edwin Hoy. Oshikawa, an ex-samurai in Matsuyama became the seminary's first president. In 1891, the school was renamed Tohoku Gakuin (東北學院, Tōhoku gakuin) and a course for non-Christian students was added.

=== Pre-war development and wartime ===
The first president Oshikawa resigned in 1901 and was succeeded by David Bowman Schneder (1857–1938). In 1904, college courses were added and authorized by the Specialized School Order. The college at first had two Departments: Letters, Theology. In 1918, Normal School and the Department of Commerce were added. In 1926, the main building (still used today) was built in Tsuchitoi Campus. Schneder left the college due to age, but even in his last days he had strong faith and gave the sermon titled "I am not ashamed of the gospel" (1936, the 50th anniversary of the school).

During World War II, the college was virtually forced to stop functioning and Tohoku Gakuin College of Aeronautical Engineering (東北學院航空工業專門學校, Tōhoku gakuin kōkū kōgyō senmon gakkō) was established instead (1944–1947). Due to the Sendai air-raid on July 10, 1945, the college lost the buildings of old Sendai Theological Seminary and normal school.

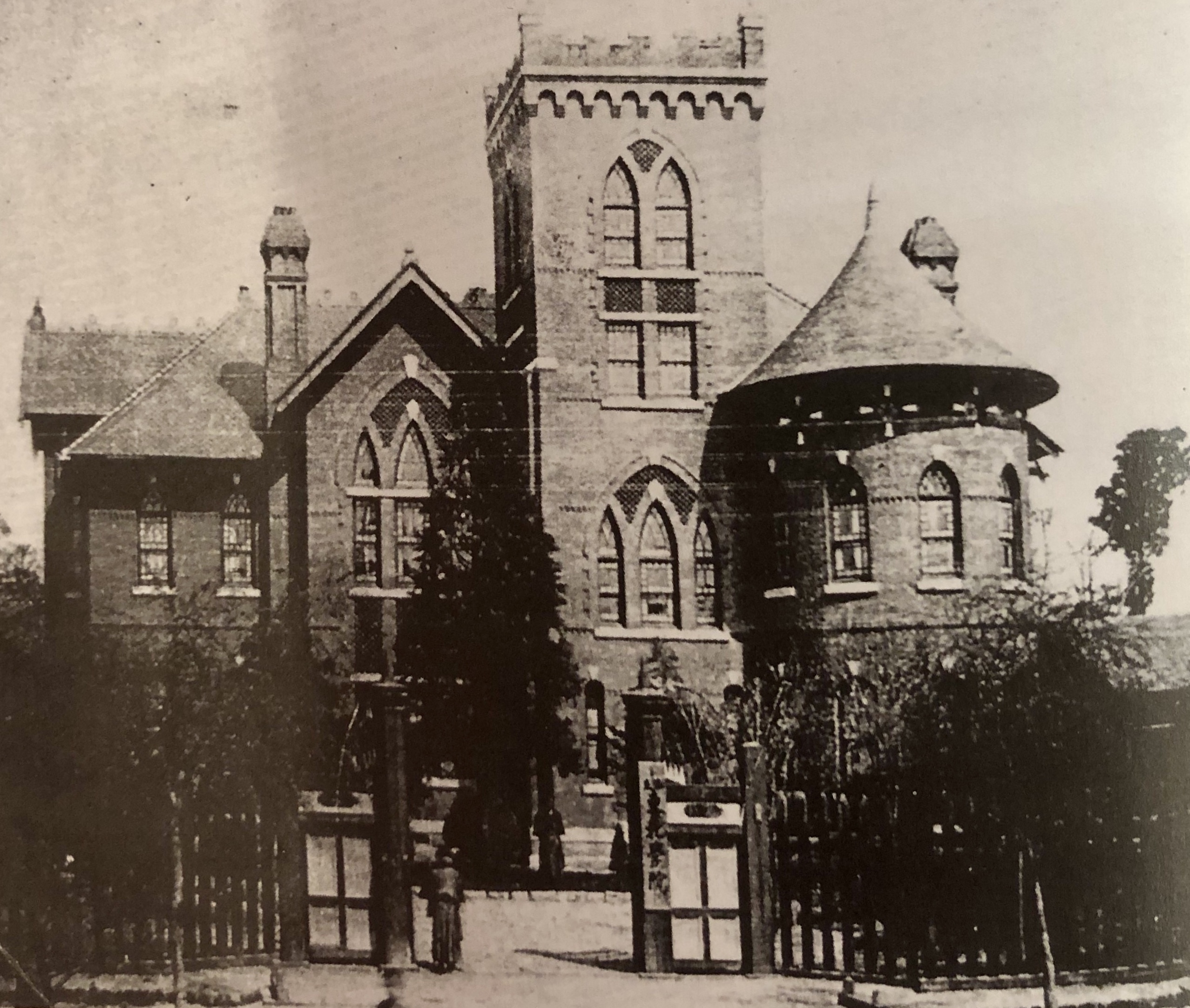
Department of Theology, Tohoku Gakuin College (Old Sendai Theological Seminary)

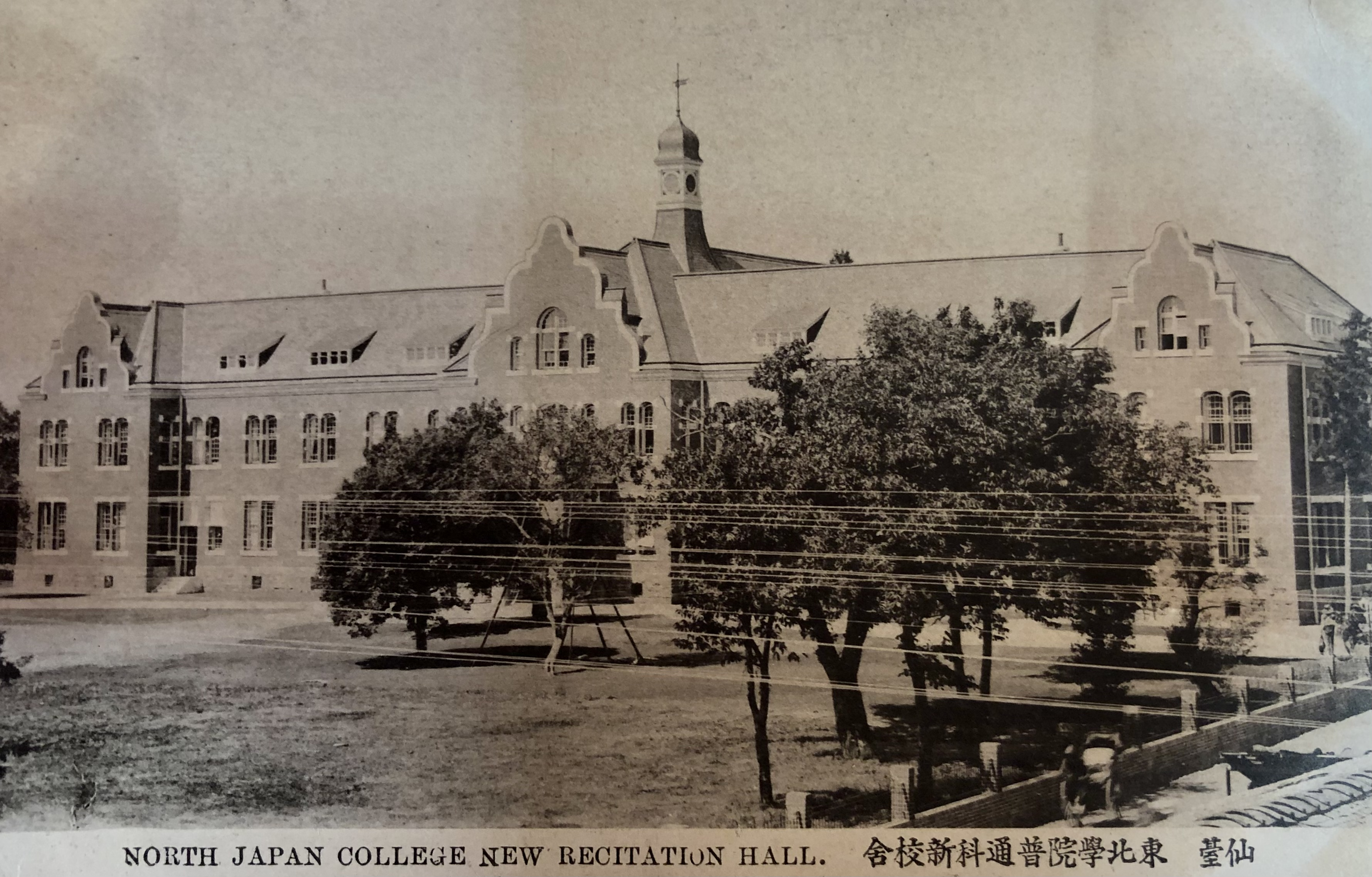
Recitation Hall, Tohoku Gakuin Normal School in 1905

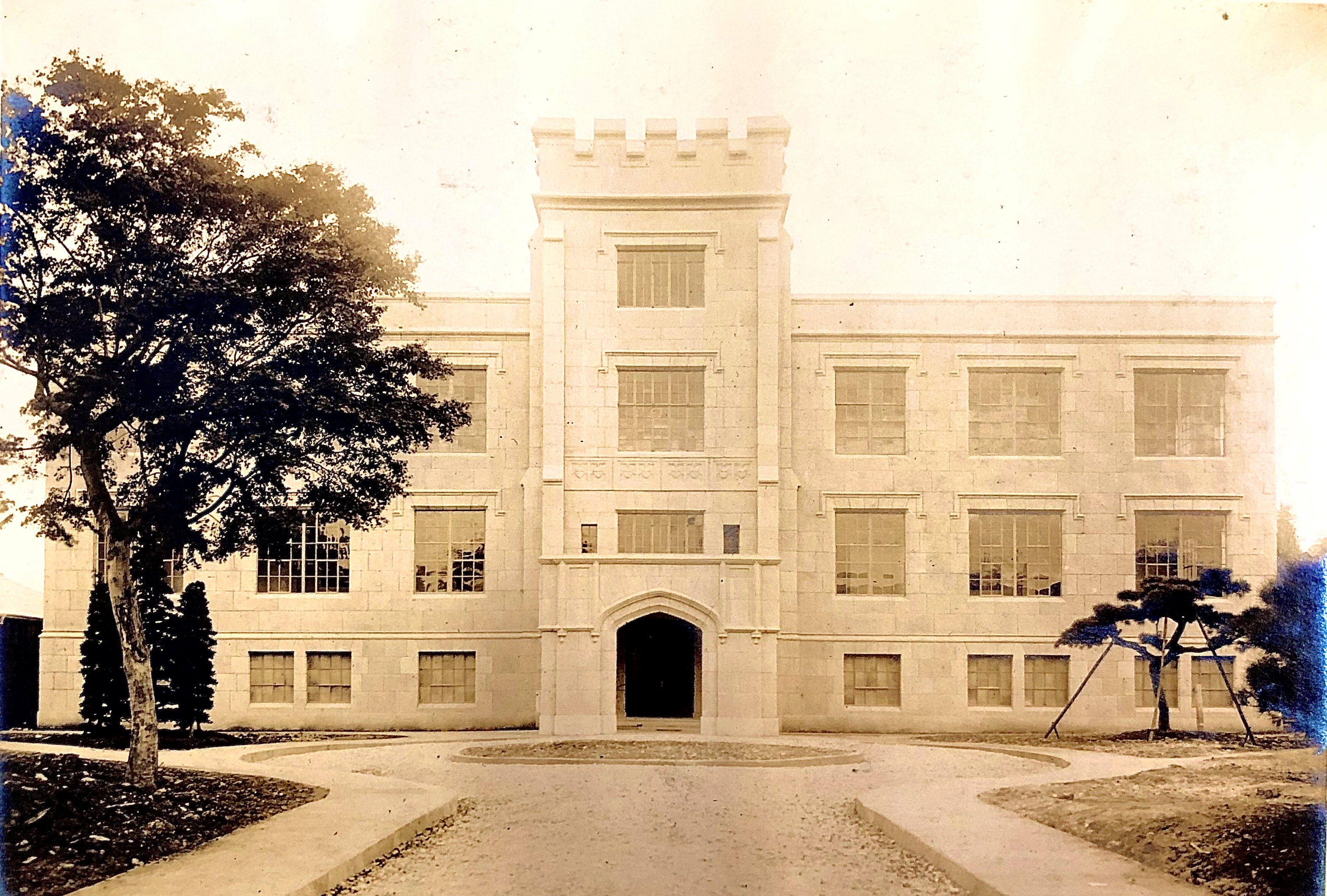
Main Building, Tohoku Gakuin College in 1926

=== Post-war growth ===
After the war, following education reforms in Japan, it was reorganized to the status of a university and established Faculty of Letters and Economics in 1949. During the 1960s, Tohoku Gakuin University grew into a comprehensive university with 4 faculties and graduate school. In 1962, Faculty of Engineering opened on Tagajo campus, where was used for a United States Army base, Camp Loper from 1945 to 1954. In 1964, Faculty of Letters and Economics was divided into Faculty and Letters and Faculty of Economics. Faculty of Law was established in 1965. During the 1980s, the university expanded its campus in the suburb of Sendai City. In 1988, Izumi campus opened in the northern part of Sendai City, and established Faculty of Liberal Arts.

=== 21st century ===
However, during the 2000s, the university changed the development policy to bring the facilities at outer campuses back to Tsuchitoi main campus. In 2023, Itsutsubashi campus opened near Tsuchitoi campus and Tagajo campus was abolished. At the same time, instead of Faculty of Liberal Arts, four faculties including Faculty of Regional Studies, Faculty of Informatics, Faculty of Human Sciences and Faculty of International Studies were established.

== Campus ==
The university operates across three campuses: Tsuchitoi Campus, Itsutsubashi Campus in central Sendai, and Izumi Campus in northern Sendai, but Izumi Campus is now used only for athletic fields. Sendai, which is 1.5 hours away from Tokyo by Tōhoku Shinkansen, is the capital city with 1.1 million residents in Tohoku region, northern Japan. Two campuses are located close to each other and in only a 15-minute walk from Sendai Station.

- Tsuchitoi Campus (1-3-1 Tsuchitoi, Aoba-ku, Sendai)
- Itsutsubashi Campus (3-1 Shimizukoji, Wakabayashi-ku, Sendai)
- Izumi Campus (2-1-1 Tenjinzawa, Izumi-ku, Sendai)
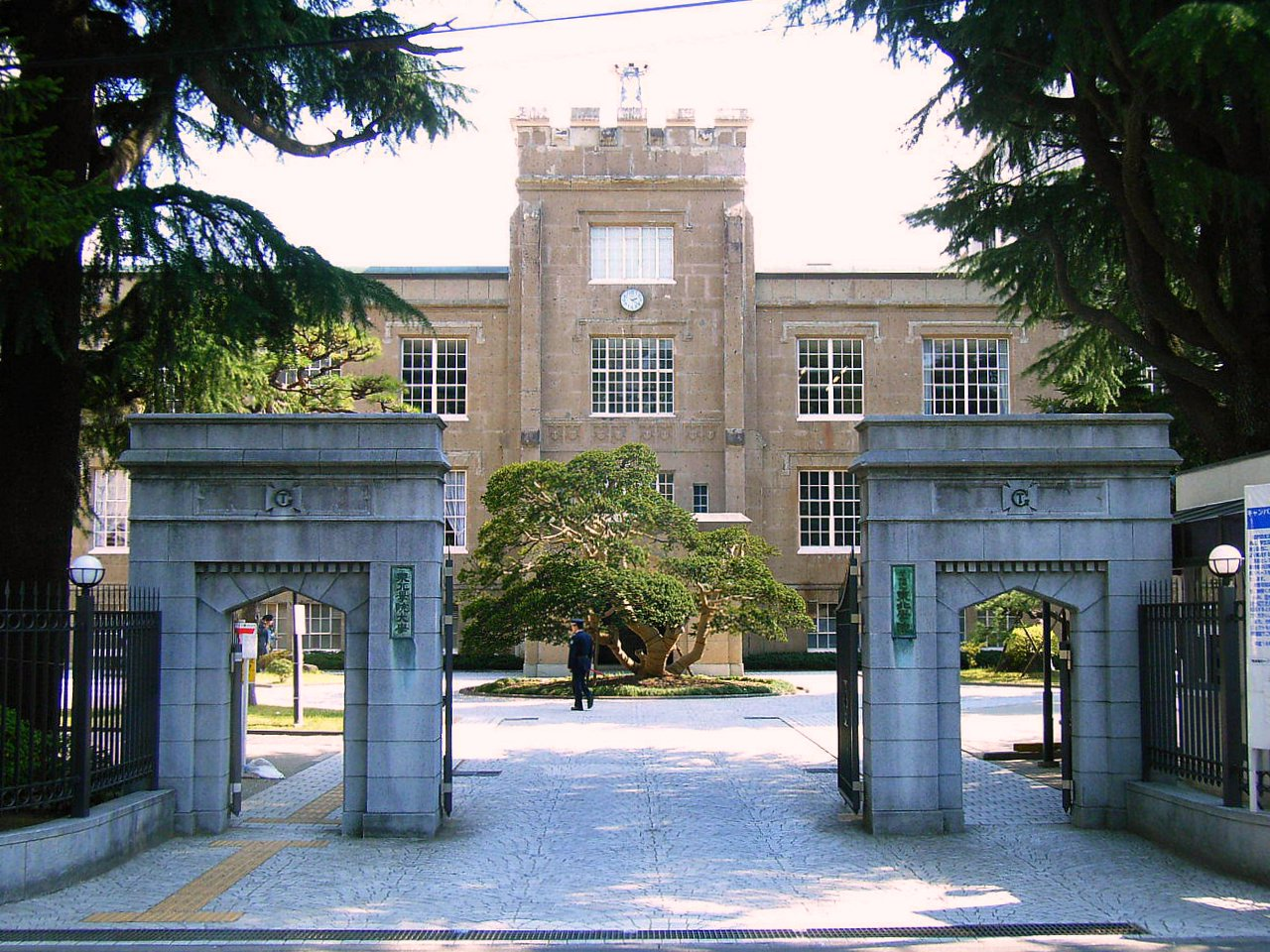
The Main Gate and the Main Building (Tsuchitoi Campus).

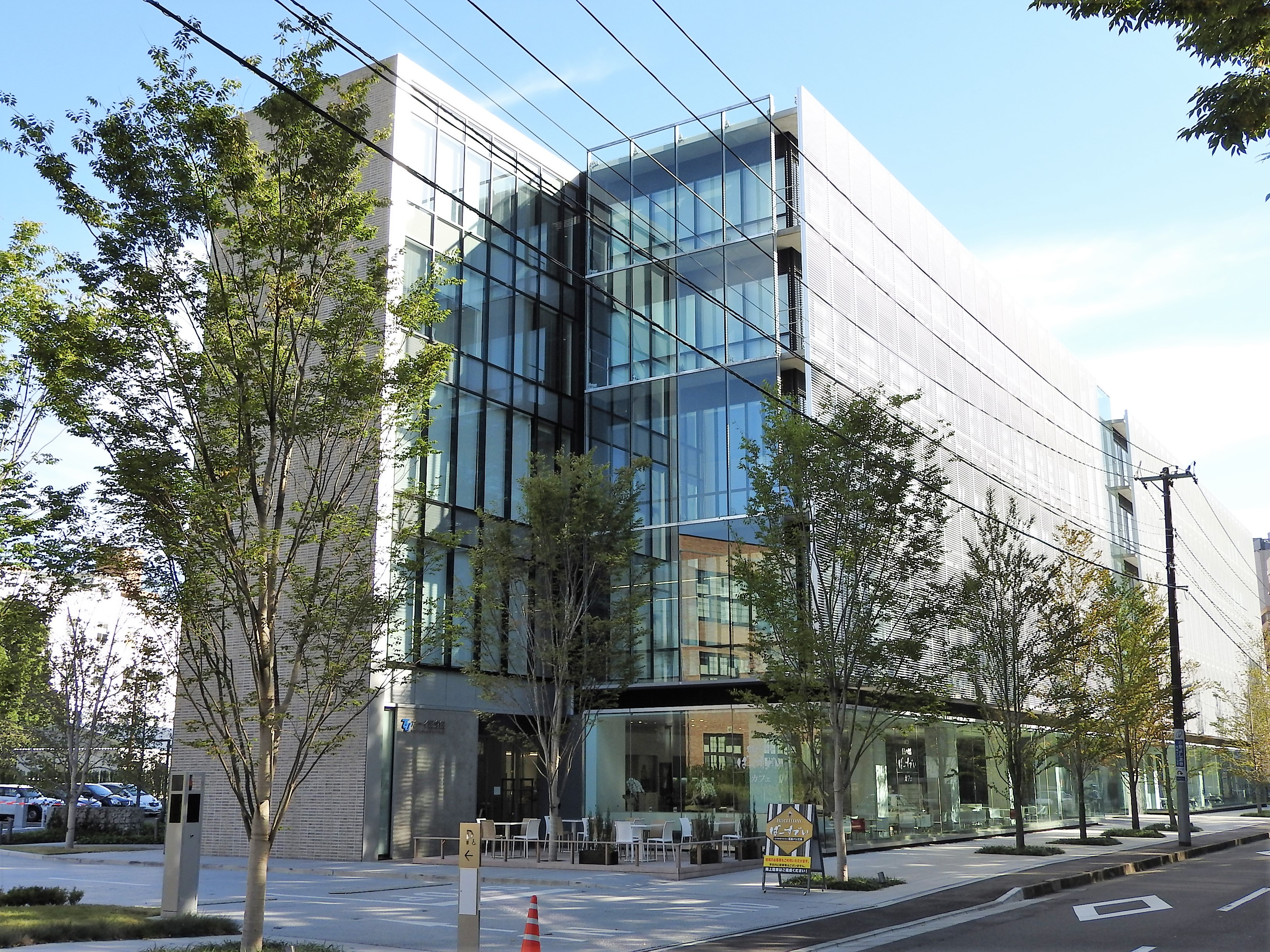
W. E. Hoy Memorial Building (Tsuchitoi Campus).

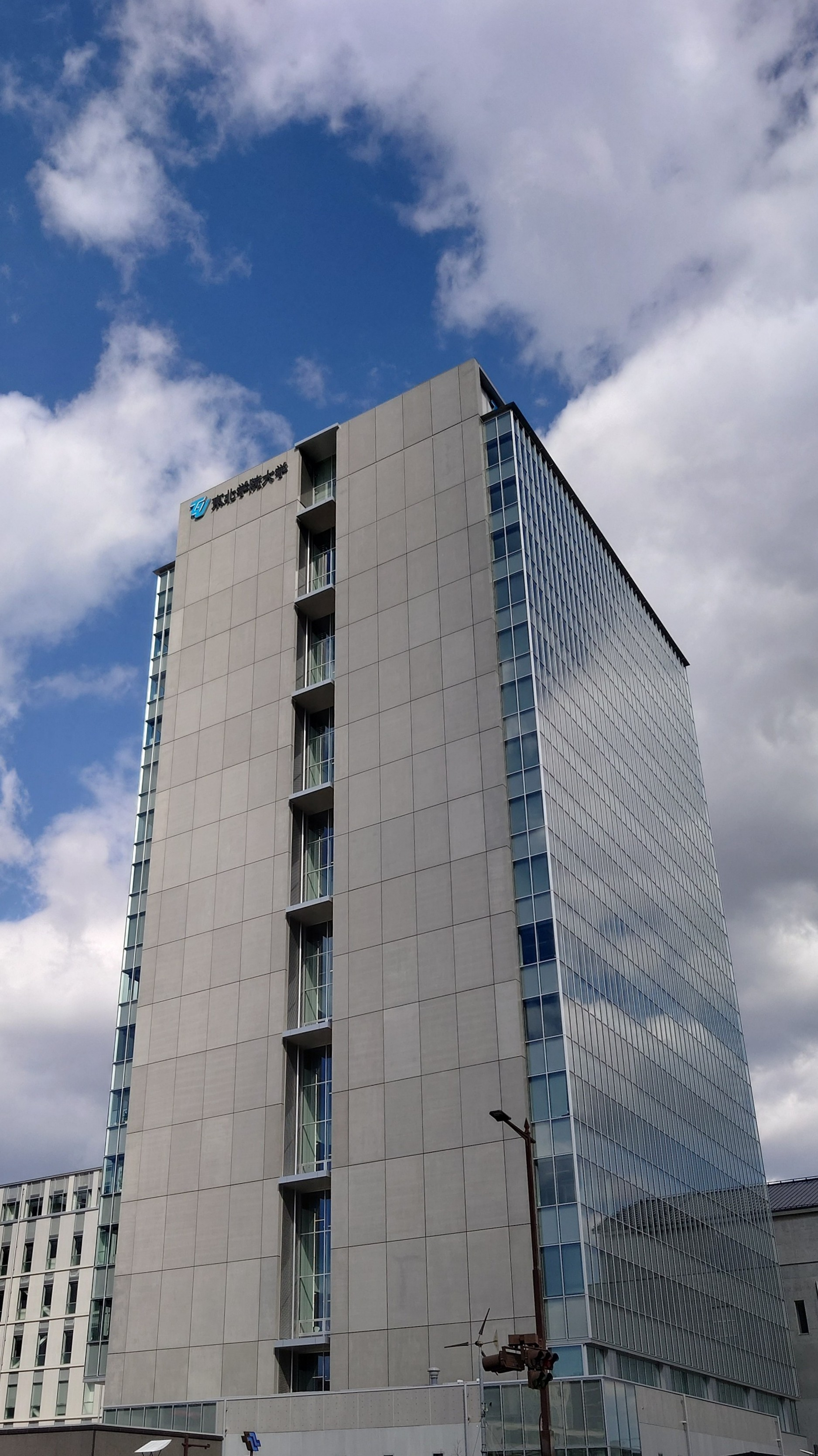
D. B. Schneder Memorial Building (Itsutsubashi Campus).

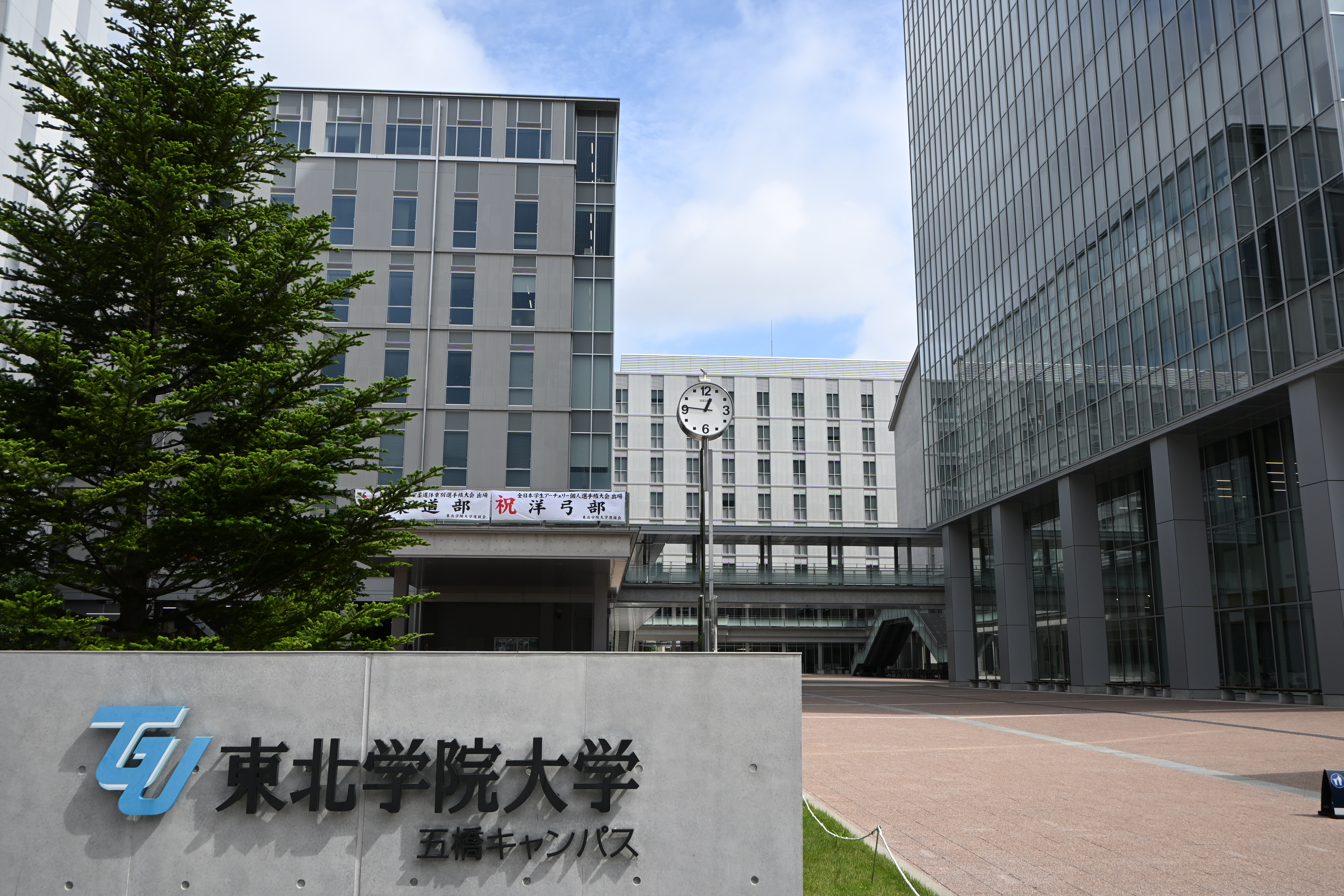
The Main Gate (Itsutsubashi Campus).

== Symbols ==
=== University visual identity ===
- TG Emblem (designated in 1901)
- University "symbol mark" (designated in 2000)
- Brandmark (designated in 2023)
  - TG Athletic Association Fleur-de-lis Emblem (designated in the 1950s)
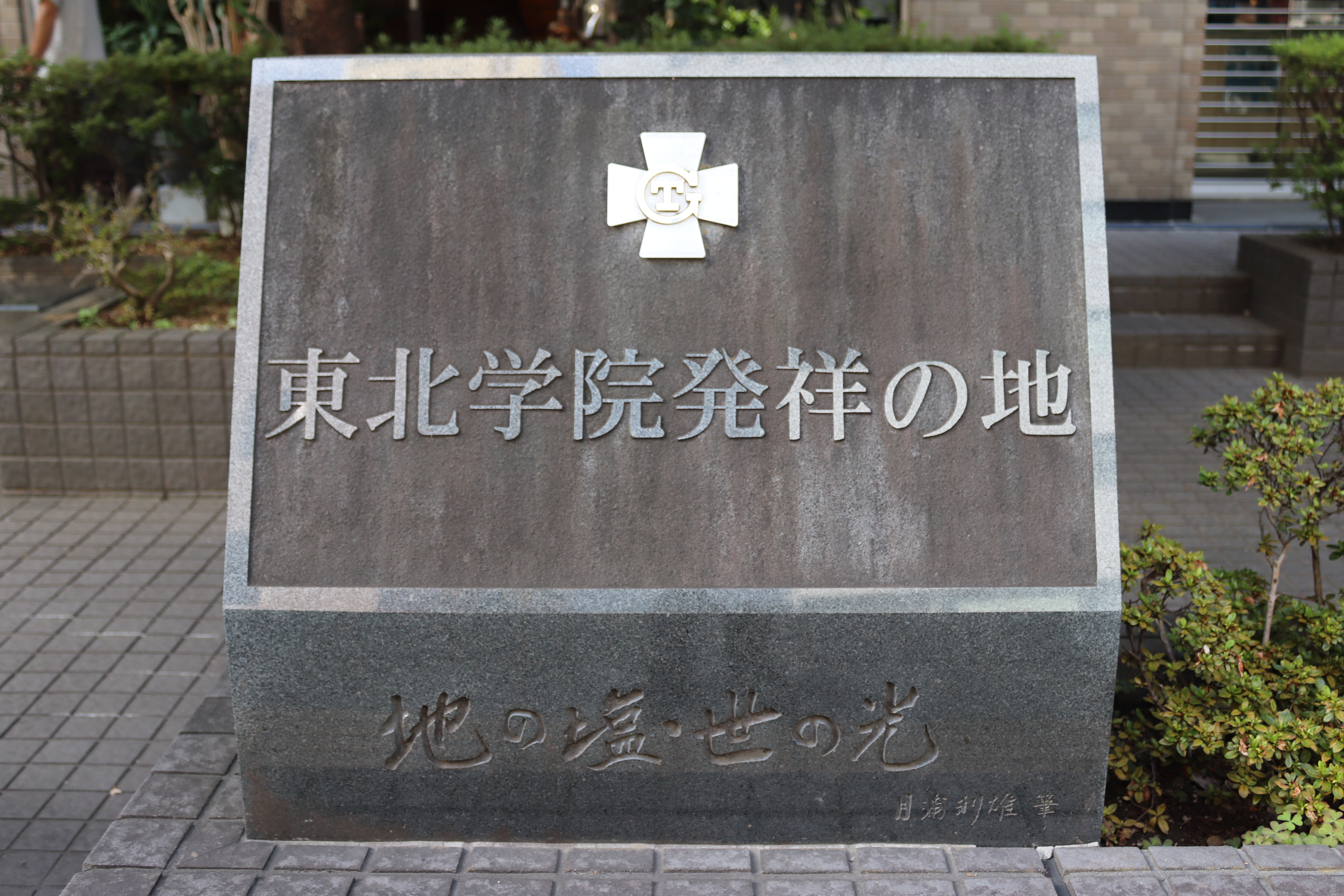
TG Emblem

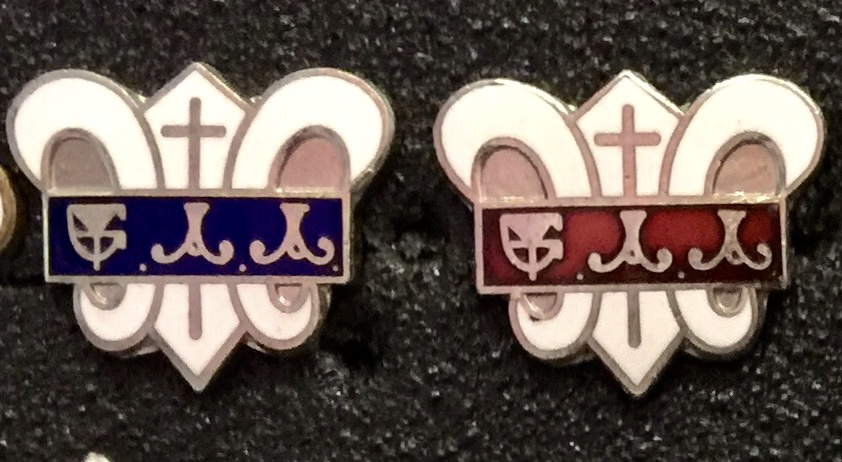
TGAA Fleur-de-lis Emblem

=== School songs ===
- Tohoku Gakuin school song "Fair Gakuin" (designated in 1921)

== Academics ==
=== Organization ===
The university is a comprehensive university comprising 9 undergraduate faculties, as well as 6 graduate schools:

==== Undergraduate faculties ====
- Letters
  - English
  - General Humanities
  - History
  - Education
- Economics
  - Economics
- Business Administration
  - Business Administration
- Law
  - Law
- Engineering
  - Mechanical Engineering and Intelligent Systems
  - Electrical and Electronic Engineering
  - Civil and Environmental Engineering
- Regional Studies
  - Regional Community Studies
  - Policy Design
- Informatics
  - Data Science
- Human Sciences
  - Psychology and Behavioral Sciences
- International Studies
  - International Studies
- Center for Liberal Arts Education

==== Graduate schools ====
Graduate schools at the university include:

- Letters
  - English Language and Literature (M, D)
  - European Historical and Cultural Studies (M, D)
  - Asian Historical and Cultural Studies (M, D)
- Economics
  - Economics (M, D)
  - Economic Data Science (M)
- Business Administration
  - Business Administration (M)
- Law
  - Law (M, D)
- Engineering
  - Mechanical Engineering (M, D)
  - Electrical Engineering (M, D)
  - Electronic Engineering (M, D)
  - Civil and Environmental Engineering (M, D)
- Human Informatics
  - Human Informatics (M, D)

== Student life ==
On campus, students are encouraged to participate in extracurricular cultural and athletic clubs or circles, of which there are around 200. Sports clubs range from judo to skiing, and cultural clubs cover a wide range of other interests, from choirs to esports. All official clubs are organized under the Student General Committee (Gakusei-kai).

=== Cultural activities ===
There are over 150 cultural clubs at Tohoku Gakuin University including both official and unofficial ones. Official clubs are organized under the Association of Cultural Clubs (Bunka Dantai Rengo-kai).

=== Athletics ===
41 sports clubs are active under Tohoku Gakuin Athlete Association (TGAA, Taiku-kai), which was founded in 1918. Tohoku Gakuin University – Hokkai Gakuen University Inter-University Athletic Tournament (since 1950), and Tohoku Gakuin University – Aoyama Gakuin University Inter-University Athletic Tournament (since 1955) have been held to strengthen bonds between Protestant universities, with the participation from all sports clubs.

=== University festivals ===
- Itsutsubashi Festival(五橋祭)(Itsutsubashi Campus)
- Rokkencho Festival(六軒丁祭)(Tsuchitoi Campus)

== Centers and facilities ==
=== Centers ===
- Christianity Center
- Tohoku Gakuin Archives Center
- Regional Liaison Center
- Learning Commons Colatelier
- Information Processing Center
- Teacher-training Course Center
- Industry-academia Collaboration Center
- Science and Mathematics Basic Education Center
- Foreign Languages Education Center
- Student Health Support Center
- Global Education Center

=== Library system ===
The Tohoku Gakuin University Library System consists of the main library, the annex library located on Tsuchitoi campus, Colatelier library on Itsutsubashi campus and Izumi library storage in Izumi campus. As of 2024, the library has a collection of over 1.25 million books. The number of collections ranks it as the second-largest university library in Tohoku region, surpassed only by the Tohoku University Library.

- D. B. Schneder Memorial Main Library (Tsuchitoi Campus)
- Main Library Annex (Tsuchitoi Campus)
- Colatelier Library (Itsutsubashi Campus)

=== Learning commons colatelier ===
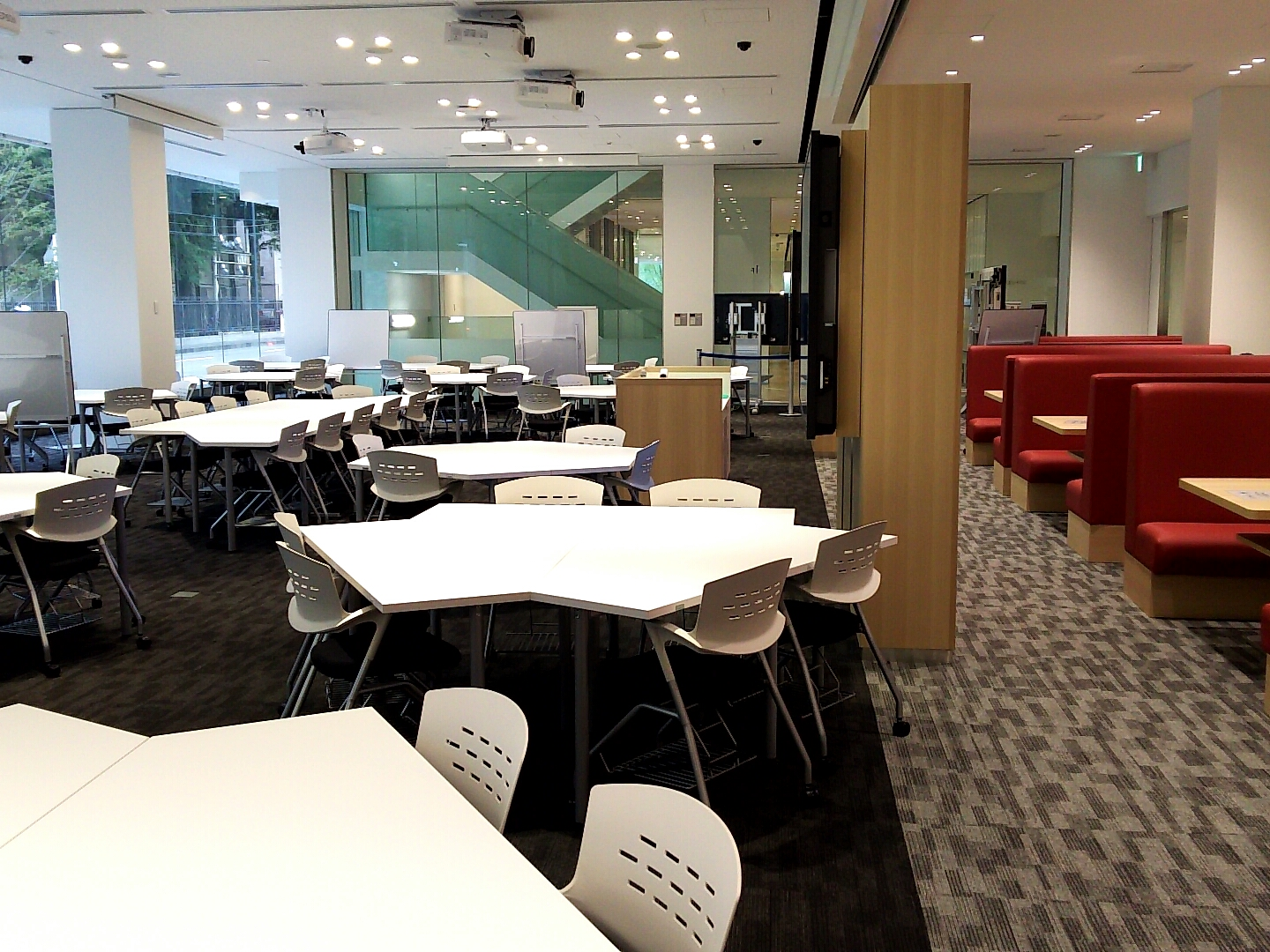
Learning Commons Colatelier at W. E. Hoy Memorial Building

Learning commons colatelier is a self-learning space for students. The university installed one of the nation's largest spaces into Hoy Memorial Building (1-2 floors, including a bakery shop) in Tsuchitoi campus in 2016, and Schneder Memorial Building (2-5 floors, including a library) in Itsutsubashi Campus in 2023.

=== Museum ===
The museum is small, but active for preserving historical artifacts, educating visitors, and exhibiting the research activities in TGU. Since its founding in November 2009, the museum has offered training programs for museum curators.

- Tohoku Gakuin University Museum

=== University archives ===
The Tohoku Gakuin Archives (東北学院史資料センター) is located in the basement floor of Rahauser Memorial Chapel in Tsuchitoi Campus. In 2001, the university established the university archives to preserve and exhibit historically important materials and records related to Christian missionaries in Tohoku region and development of the university.

=== Inter-department institutes for education and research ===
- Institute for Research in Business Administration (経営研究所)
- Institute for Research in Christianity and Culture (キリスト教文化研究所)
- Institute for Research in Data Science (データサイエンス研究所)
- Institute for Research in Economics (経済研究所)
- Institute for Research in English Language and Literature (英語英文学研究所)
- Institute for Research in Human Sciences (人間科学研究所)
- Institute for Research in International Studies (国際学研究所)
- Institute for Research in Law and Political Science (法学政治学研究所)
- Institute for Research on Northern Japanese Culture (東北文化研究所)
- Institute for Research on Religious Music (宗教音楽研究所)
- Institute for Research on the Historical Culture of the Asian River Basins Area (アジア流域文化研究所)
- Research Institute for Education (教育総合研究所)
- Research Institute for Engineering and Technology (工学総合研究所)
- Research Institute for European Culture (ヨーロッパ文化総合研究所)
- Research Institute for Regional Studies (地域総合研究所)

== Registered cultural properties ==
Five historic buildings on Tsuchitoi campus are preserved as registered cultural properties in national and ministerial levels. In 2013, the DeForest family home was designated a registered tangible cultural property. Then in 2014, the Main Building of Tohoku Gakuin, the Rahauser Memorial Chapel, and the Tohoku Gakuin University Graduate School Building followed. In 2016, the DeForest family home was designated a nationally important cultural property. Tohoku Gakuin University Main Gate was added to the list of registered tangible cultural properties in 2021.

- DeForest Family Home (built in 1887)
- Rahauser Memorial Chapel (built in 1932)
- Tohoku Gakuin University Main Building (built in 1926, designed by Jay Herbert Morgan)
- Tohoku Gakuin University Graduate School Building (built in 1952)
- Tohoku Gakuin University Main Gate (built in 1926, designed by Jay Herbert Morgan)
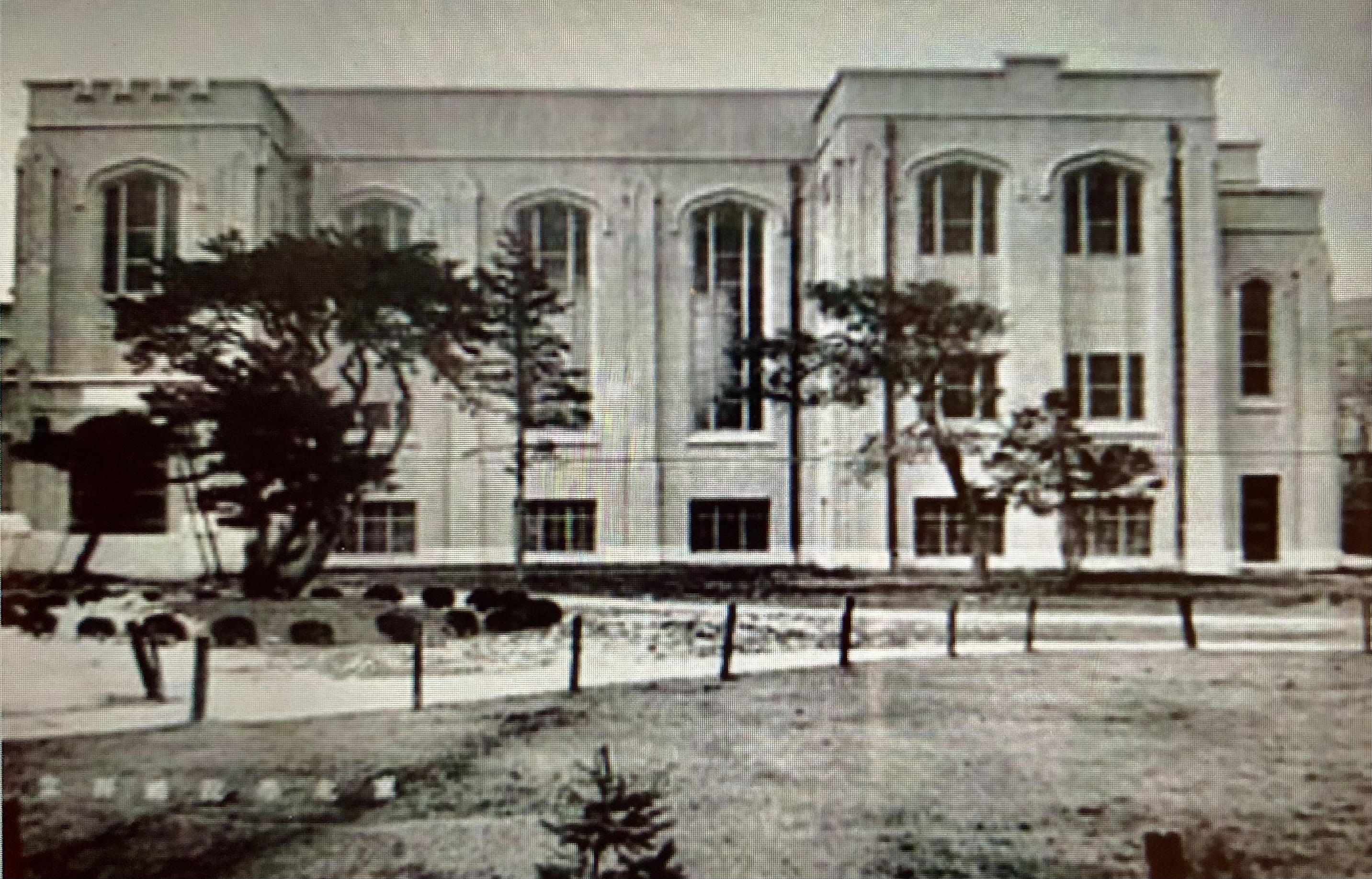
Rahauser Memorial Chapel in 1932 (Tsuchitoi Campus).

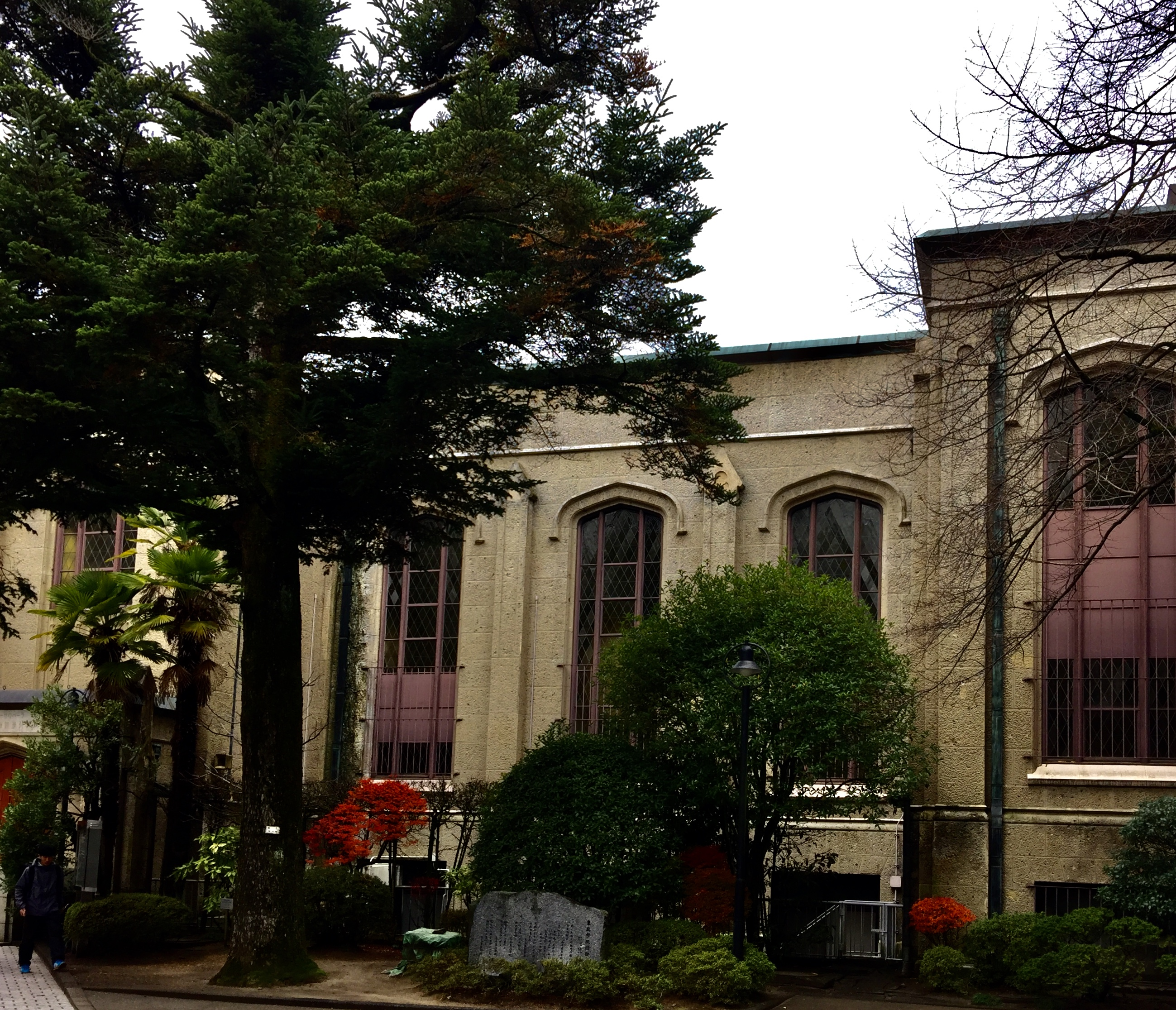
Rahauser Memorial Chapel in 2016 (Tsuchitoi Campus).

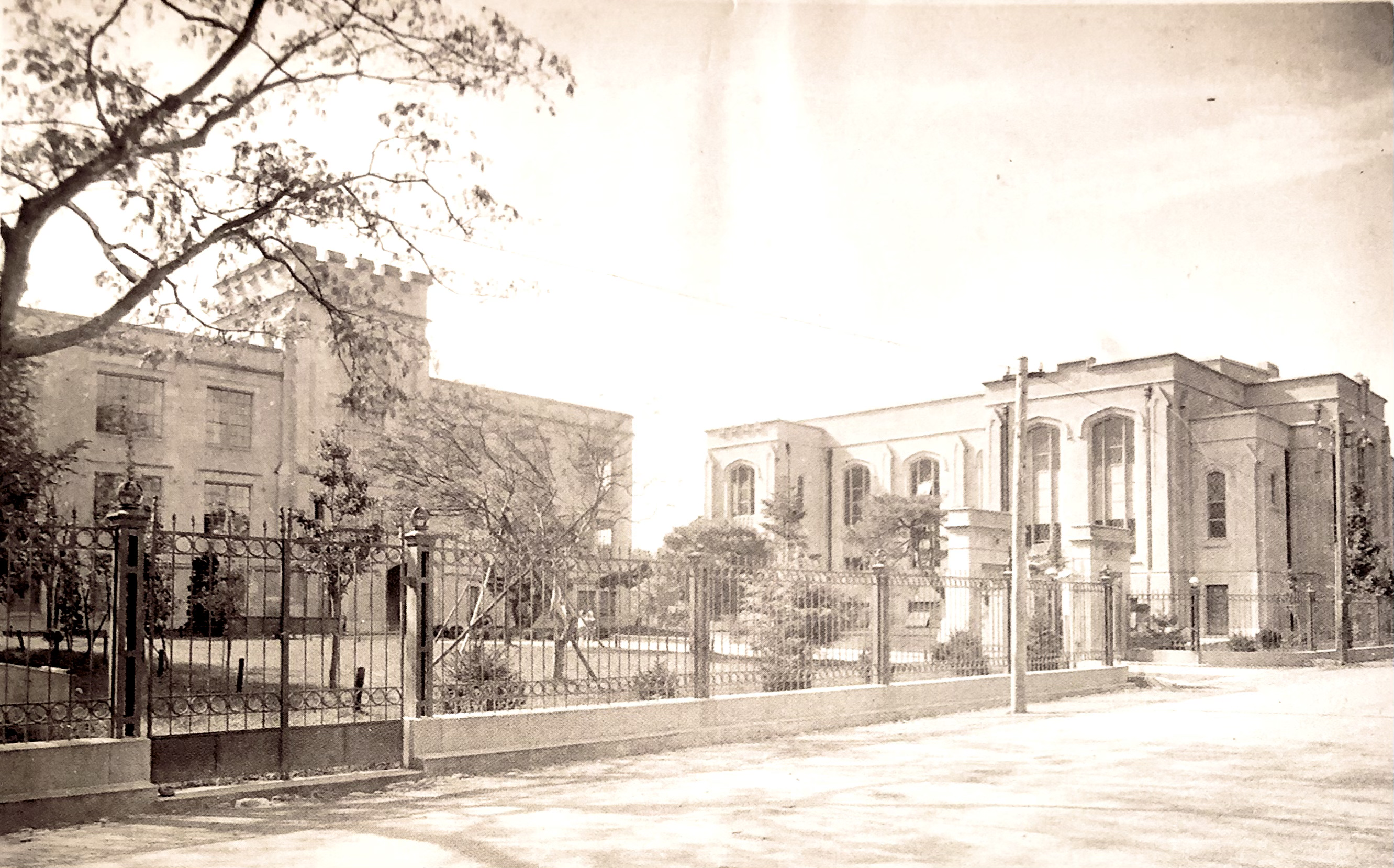
Tohoku Gakuin University's Historical Buildings in 1937 (Tsuchitoi Campus).

== Accreditation ==
The university has received accreditation from the Japan University Accreditation Association (JUAA).

== Rankings ==
Times Higher Education (THE) places Tohoku Gakuin University in the 150+ bracket in its ranking of Japan's 200 best universities. In THE University Impact Rankings, the university was also ranked as 301+ in 2019, 601+ in 2020, 1001+ in 2021-2023, and 1501+ in 2024-2025.

== Affiliated schools ==
- Tohoku Gakuin Junior & Senior High School
- Tohoku Gakuin Tsutsujigaoka High School
- Tohoku Gakuin Kindergarten

== People ==
See also List in Japanese version

=== Faculty ===
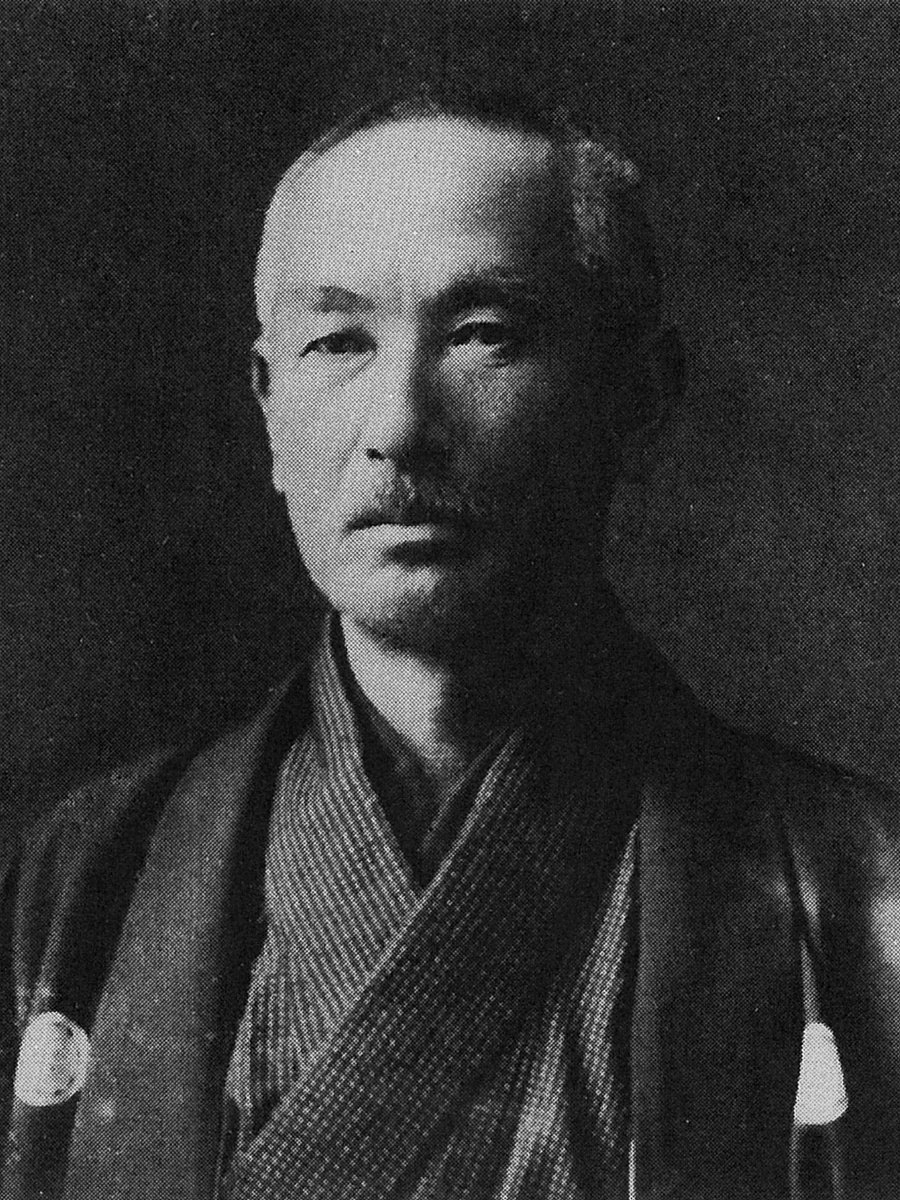
Masayoshi Oshikawa (押川方義)

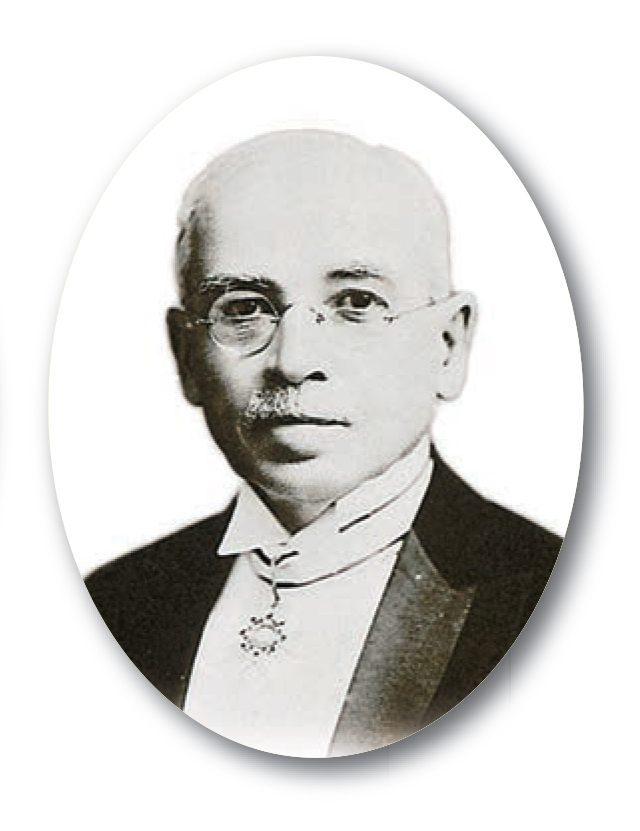
David Bowman Schneder

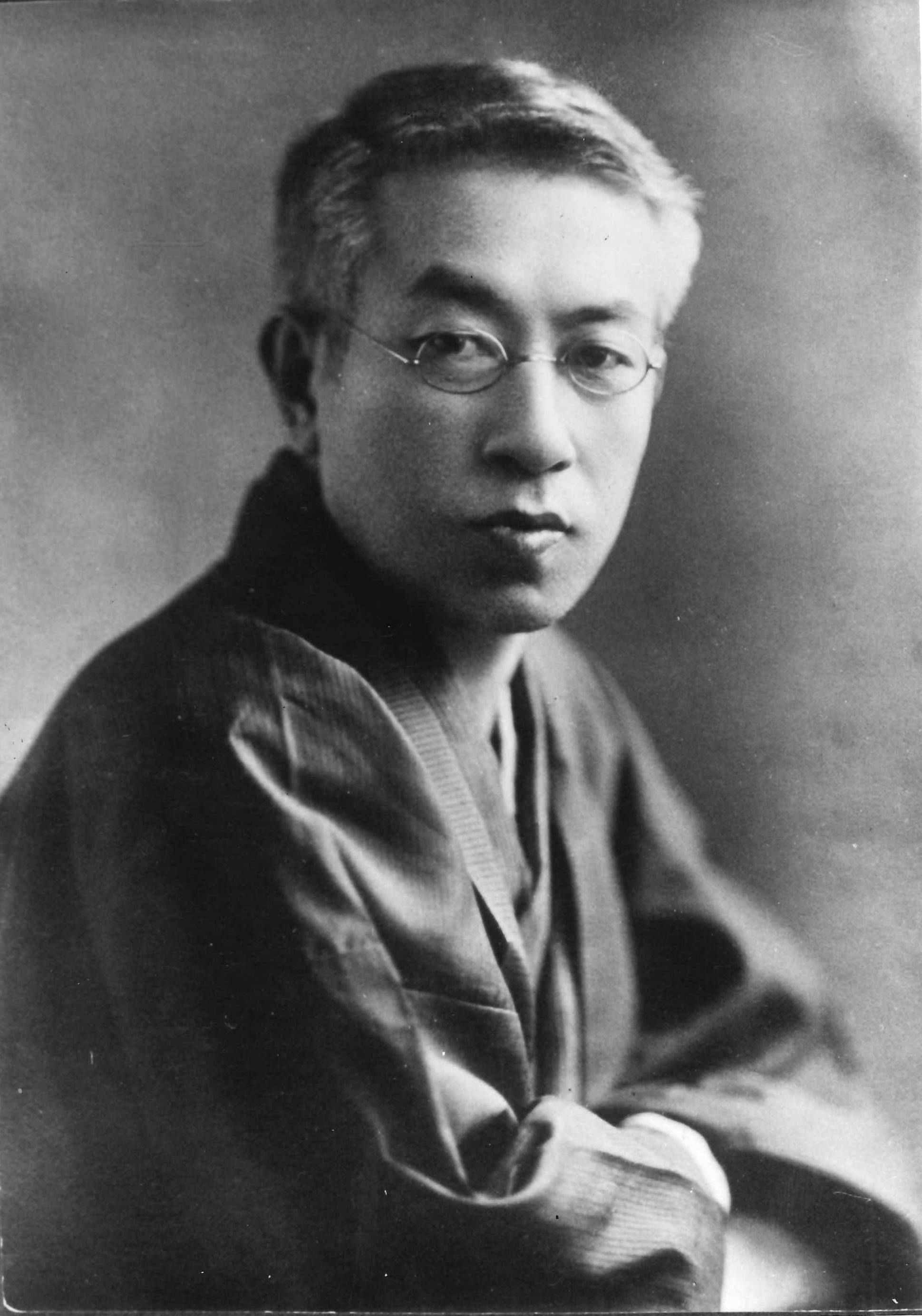
Tōson Shimazaki (島崎 藤村)
- David Bowman Schneder (American missionary educator in Japan)
- Masayoshi Oshikawa (founder and the first president)
- Tadao Tannaka (Professor, Mathematician)
- Tōson Shimazaki (Novel writer and poet)
- William Edwin Hoy (American missionary educator in Japan and China)

=== Notable alumni ===
The university has produced notable alumni from politicians and entrepreneurs to authors and actors, and a strong alumni network called "TG kai" with over 200 thousand members. TG kai's influence extends over Tohoku region's business mainly.

==== Academia ====
- Shunzo Sugimura (Leper hospital administrator and scholar)

==== Government, law, and politics ====
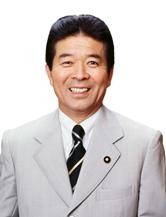
Masashi Nakano (中野 正志) Senior vice-minister of Ministry of Economy, Trade and Industry

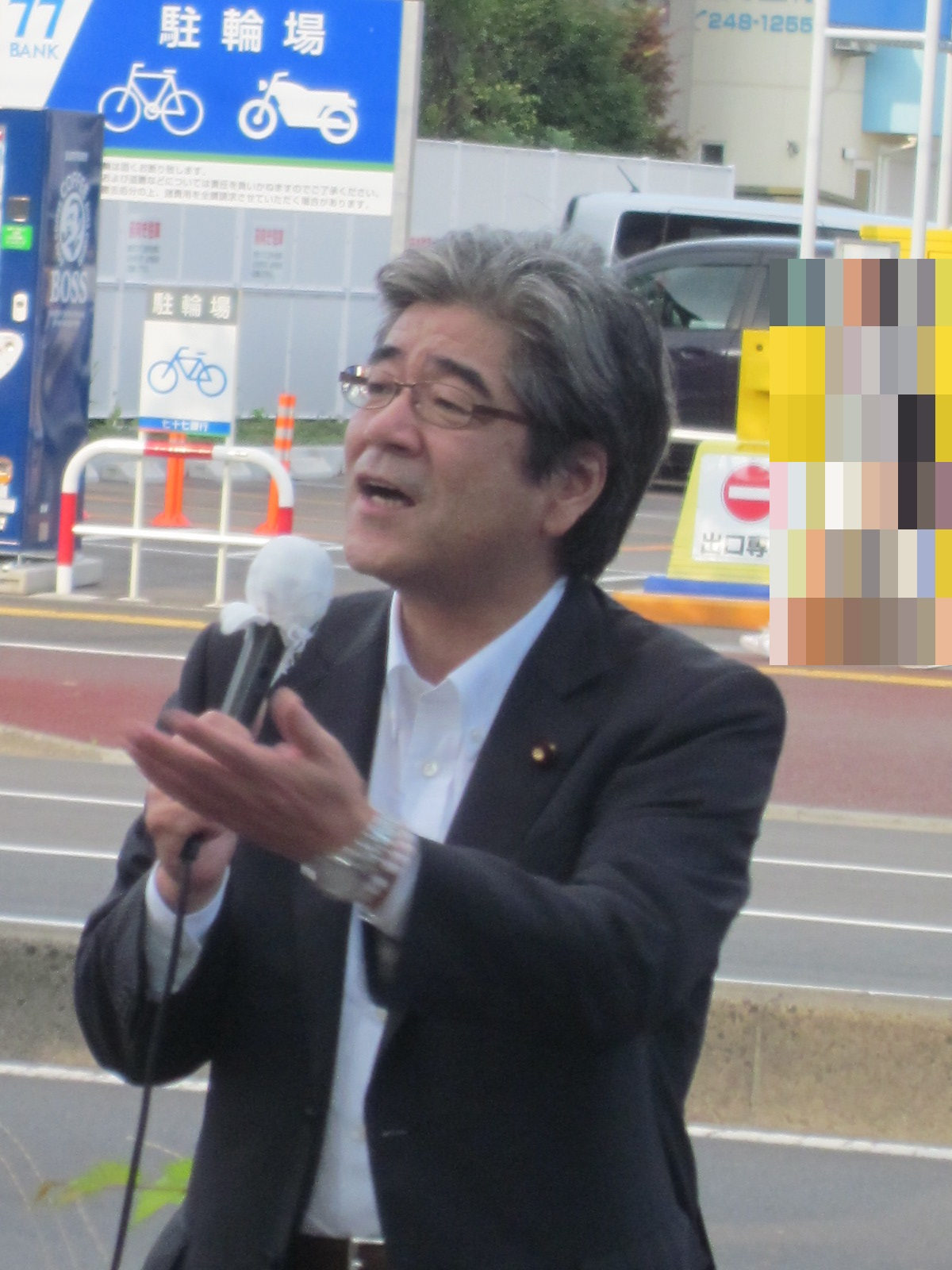
Tōru Doi（土井 亨）Member of the lower house
- Kazuko Kōri (Member of the lower house, Mayor of Sendai City)
- Masashi Nakano (Member of the lower house, senior vice-minister of Ministry of Economy, Trade and Industry)
- Tōru Doi (Member of the lower house)
- Sayuri Kamata politician

==== Literature and art ====
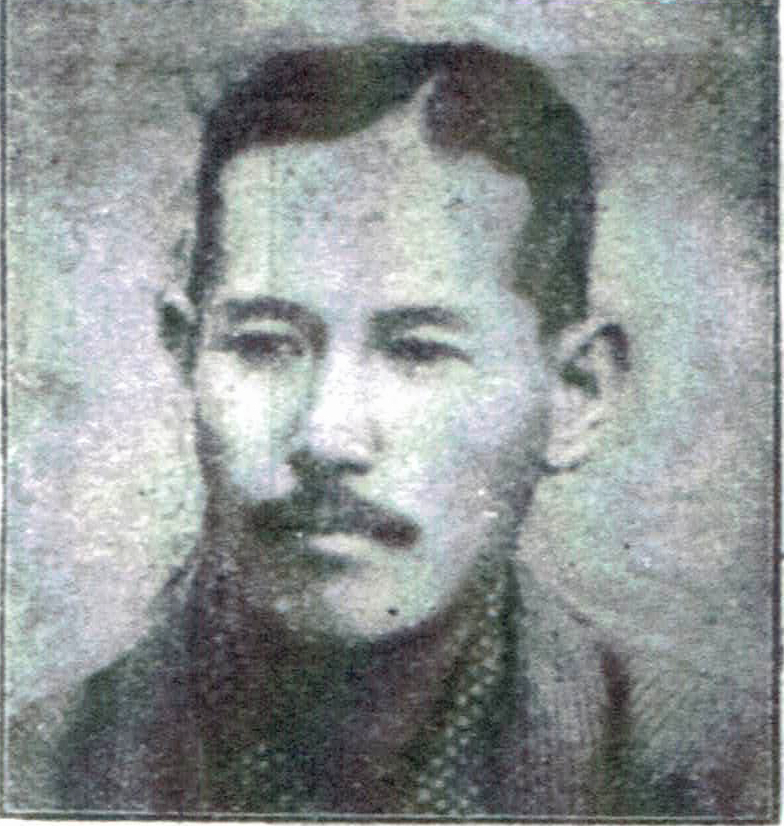
Shunrō Oshikawa (押川 春浪) Science fiction author
- Hōmei Iwano (Novel writer and poet)
- Seiichi Niikuni (Poet and artist)
- Shunrō Oshikawa (Science fiction author)

==== Entertainment ====
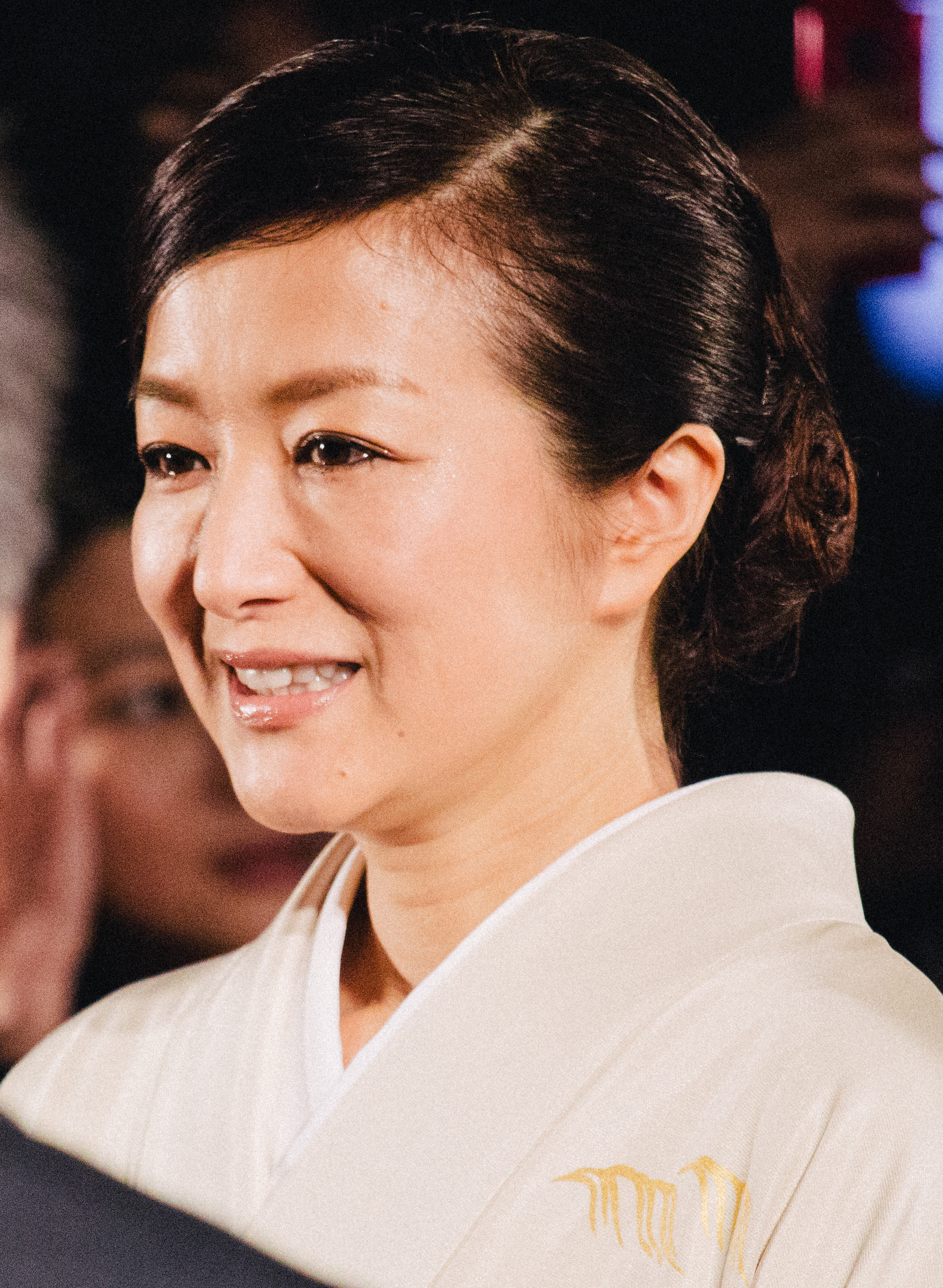
Kyōka Suzuki (鈴木 京香) Actress

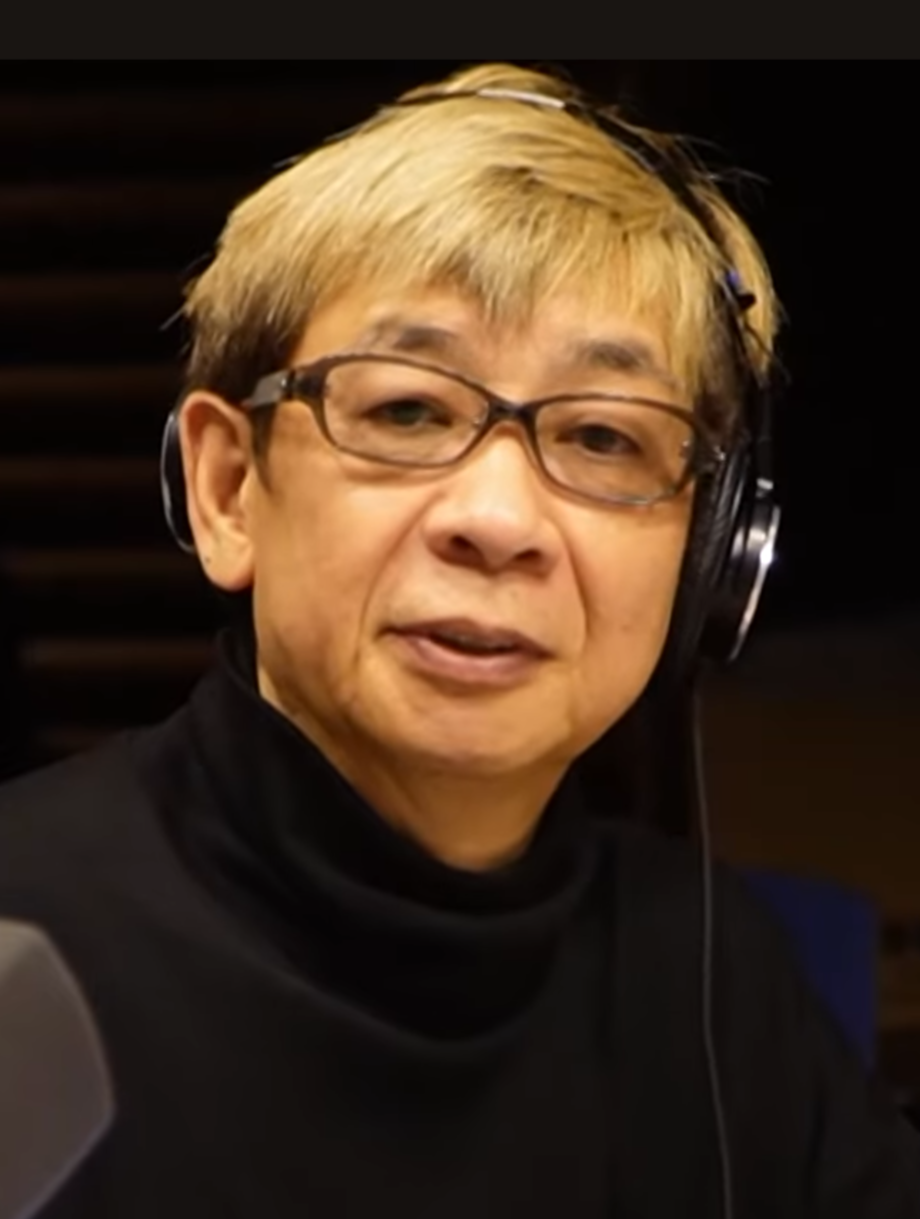
Kōichi Yamadera (山寺 宏一) Voice actor and actor

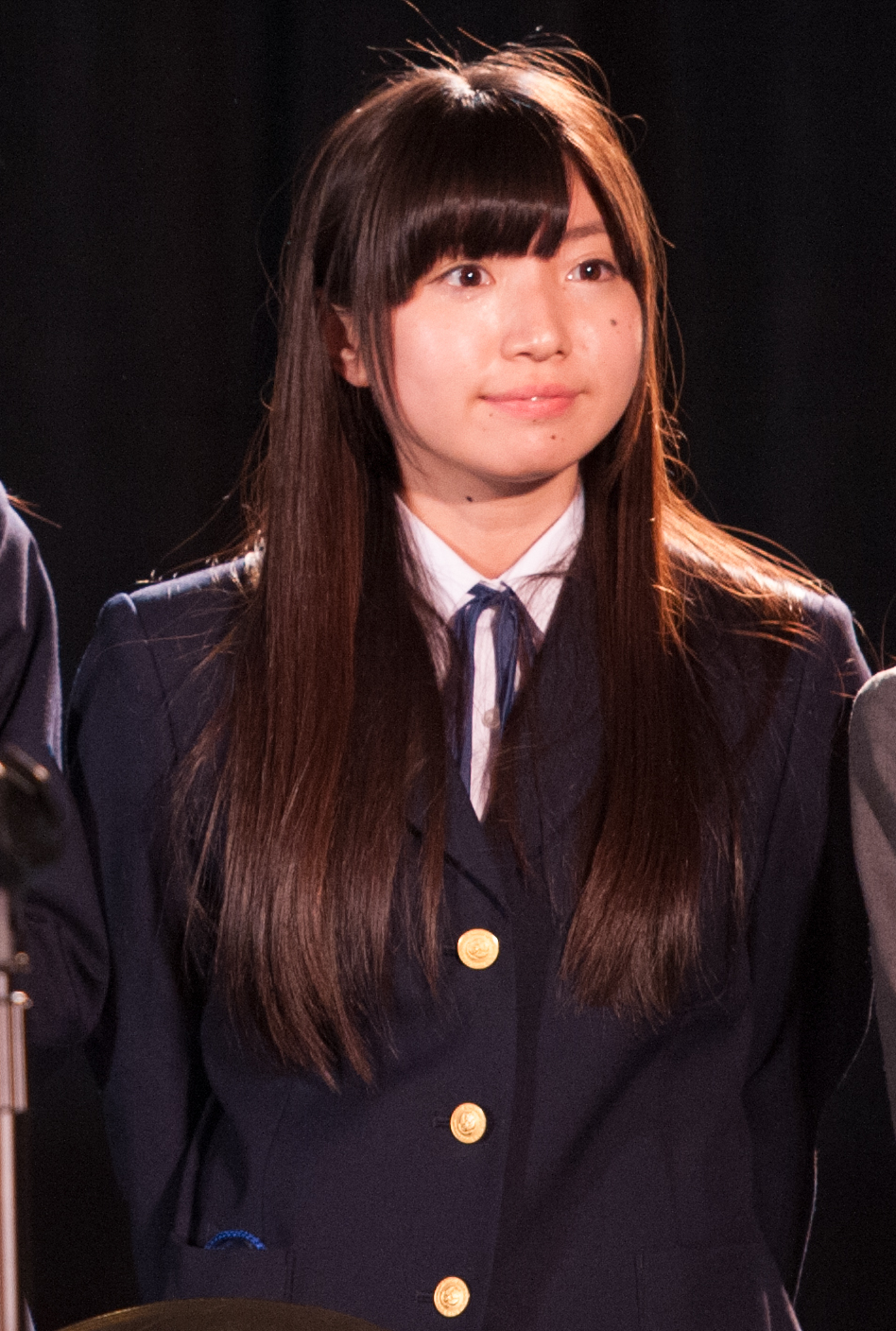
Airi Eino (永野 愛理) Voice actor and singer
- Airi Eino (Voice actor and singer)
- Kohei Otomo (Vocalist)
- Kyōka Suzuki (Actress)
- Kōichi Yamadera (Voice actor and actor)
- Takenobu Mitsuyoshi (Composer, singer)

==== Athletics and sports ====
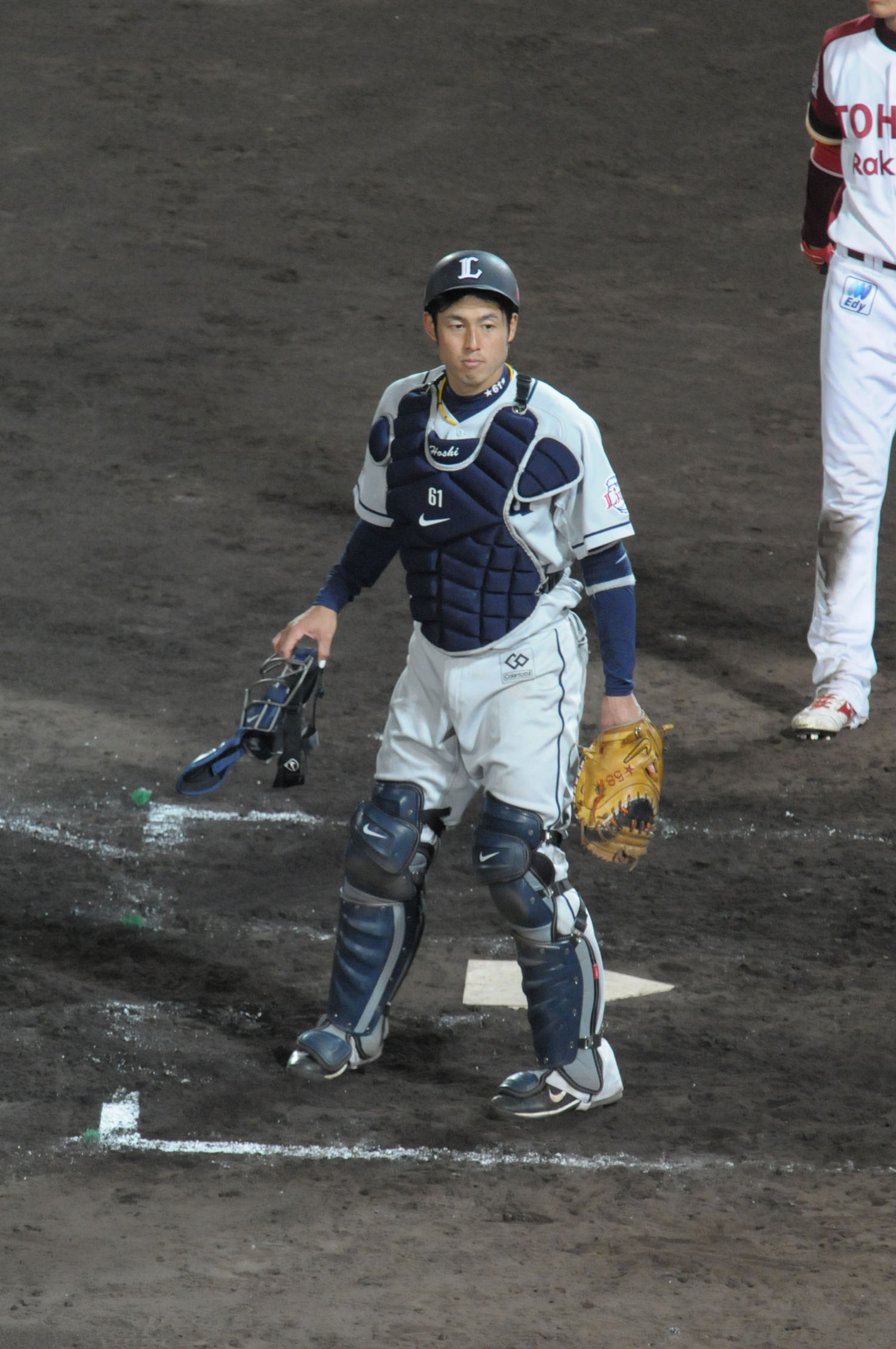
Takanori Hoshi (星 孝典) Professional baseball player

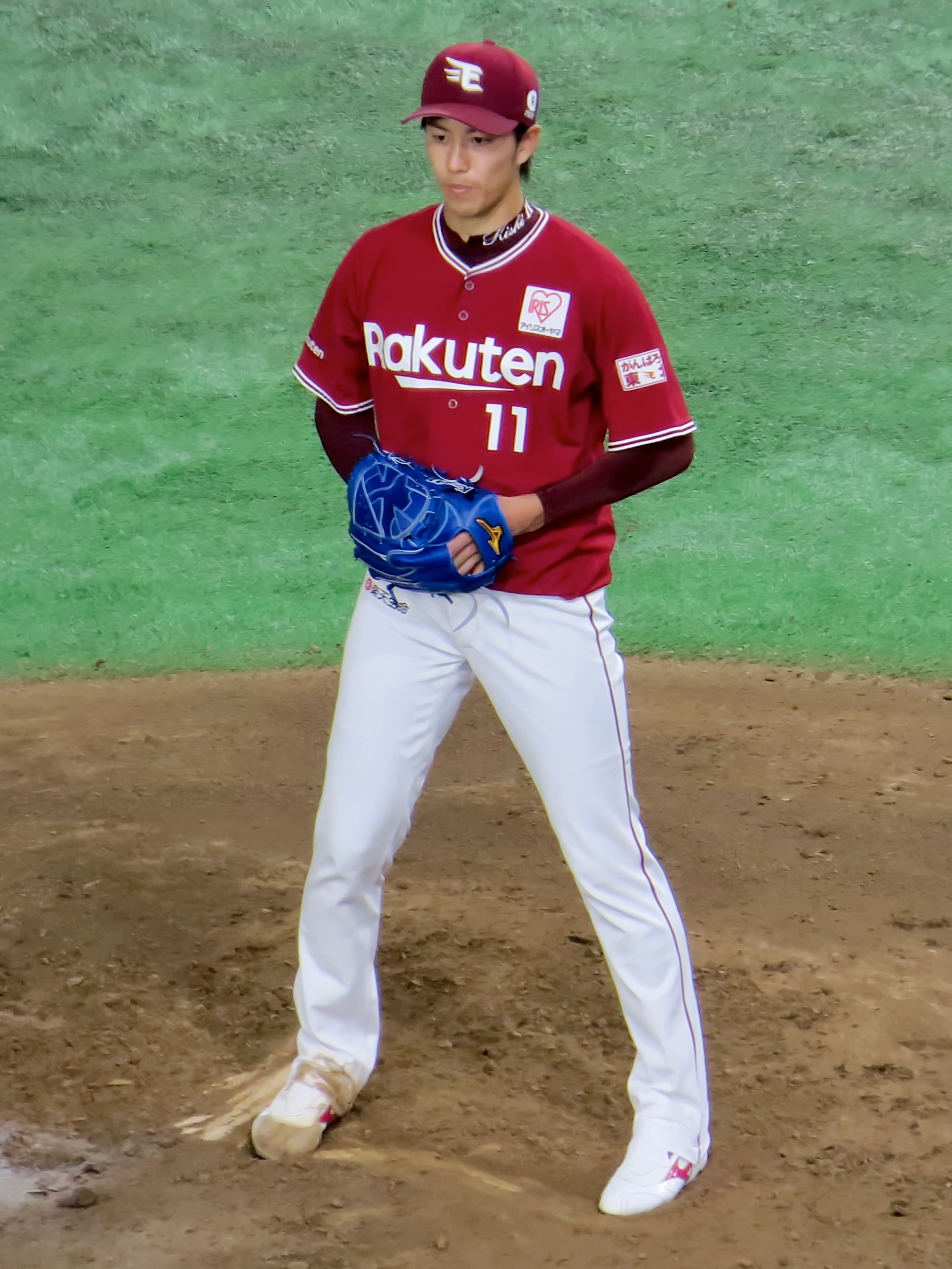
Takayuki Kishi (岸 孝之) Professional baseball player

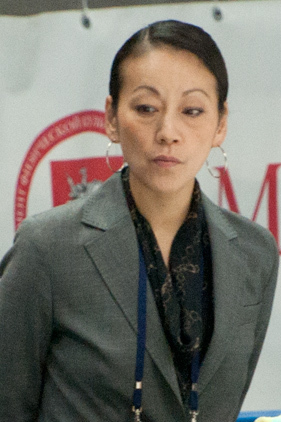
Nanami Abe (阿部 奈々美) Professional figure skater and choreographer

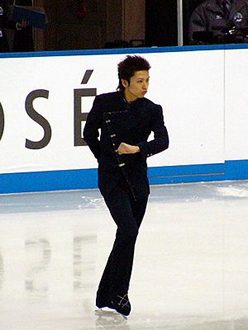
Yamato Tamura (田村 岳斗) Professional figure skater

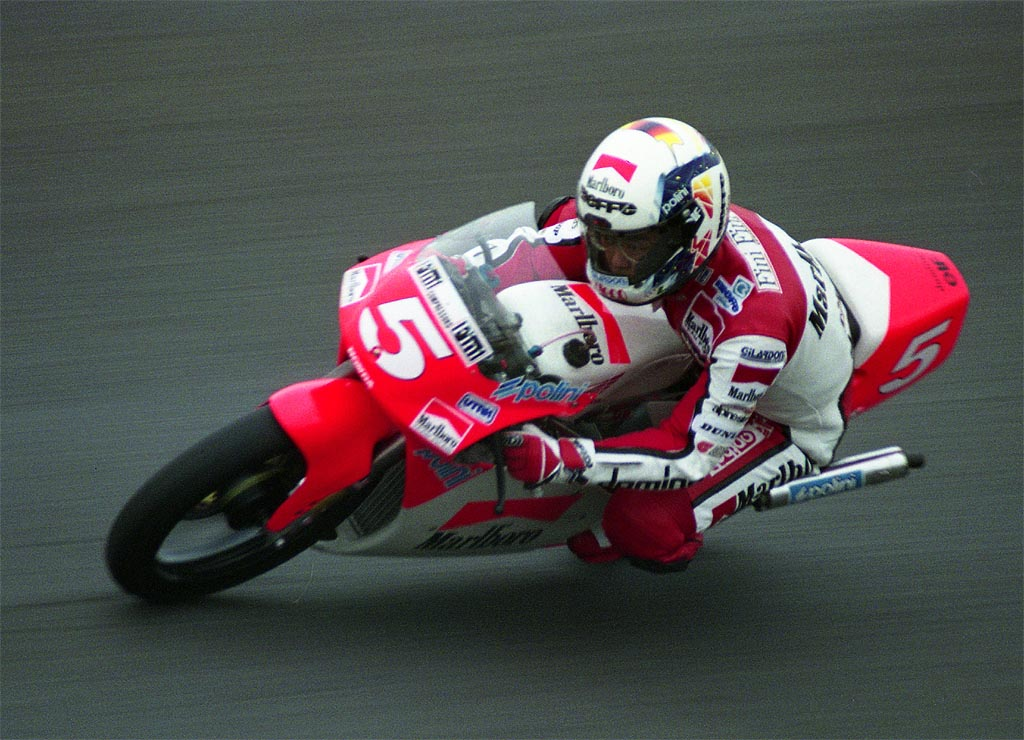
Noboru Ueda (上田 昇) Professional motorcycle road racer
- Keisuke Honda (Professional baseball player)
- Kenichi Takahashi (Professional basketball player)
- Nanami Abe (Professional figure skater and choreographer)
- Noboru Ueda (Professional motorcycle road racer)
- Shina Matsudo (Professional swimmer)
- Takanori Hoshi (Professional baseball player)
- Takayuki Kishi (Professional baseball player)
- Takeo Mabashi (Basketball coach)
- Toshihiro Mori (Karate Player)
- Yamato Tamura (Professional figure skater)
- Yasuhiro Okuyama (Professional footballer)
- Yuka Kanazawa (Professional figure skater)
- Yota Sato (Professional boxer)

== International exchanges ==
The university runs study abroad programs with 49 universities in 16 countries including US, France, Germany, Australia, Thailand, Canada and the UK. The programs started from Ursinus College in 1973.

- Ursinus College, United States
- Franklin & Marshall College, United States
- Lancaster Theological Seminary, United States
- Vincennes University, United States
- San Francisco State University, United States
- Lakeland University Japan, United States
- Moravian University, United States
- University of Victoria, Canada
- Renison University College, Canada
- Griffith College Dublin, Ireland
- University of Ulster, United Kingdom
- Newcastle University, United Kingdom
- University of Belgrade, Serbia
- RheinMain University of Applied Sciences, Germany
- University of Trier, Germany
- University of Augsburg, Germany
- Ludwigshafen University of Business and Society, Germany
- Internationale Hochschule Liebenzell, Germany
- Université Savoie Mont Blanc, France
- Catholic University of Vendée, France
- Sofia University, Bulgaria
- University of Genoa, Italy
- Nankai University, China
- Shandong University, China
- Beijing International Studies University, China
- Fu Jen Catholic University, Republic of China
- Shih Hsin University, Republic of China
- Soochow University, Republic of China
- Chang Jung Christian University, Republic of China
- Pyeongtaek University, South Korea
- Ewha Womans University, South Korea
- Hankuk University of Foreign Studies, South Korea
- Dong-eui University, South Korea
- Seoul Theological University, South Korea
- Chonnam National University, South Korea
- Keimyung University, South Korea
- Kyungpook National University, South Korea
- Sookmyung Women's University, South Korea
- Sunchon National University, South Korea
- Chosun University, South Korea
- Myongji University, South Korea
- Thai-Nichi Institute of Technology, Thailand
- Khon Kaen University, Thailand
- Chiang Mai University, Thailand
- Ho Chi Minh City University of Agriculture and Forestry, Vietnam
- Ho Chi Minh City International University, Vietnam
- Indian Institute of Technology Hyderabad, India
- University of New South Wales, Australia
- Southern Cross University, Australia

== In popular culture ==
The university's campuses are sometimes used for filming location:

- "The Foreign Duck, the Native Duck and God in a Coin Locker"（2007, Japanese title:アヒルと鴨のコインロッカー）, directed by Yoshihiro Nakamura（Izumi Campus）
- "Kyojo"（2020, Japanese title: 教場）, directed by Ryoichi Kimizuka（Izumi Campus）
- "Kyojo II"（2021, Japanese title: 教場II）, directed by Ryoichi Kimizuka（Izumi Campus）
