= William Edwin Hoy =

American missionary (1858–1927)

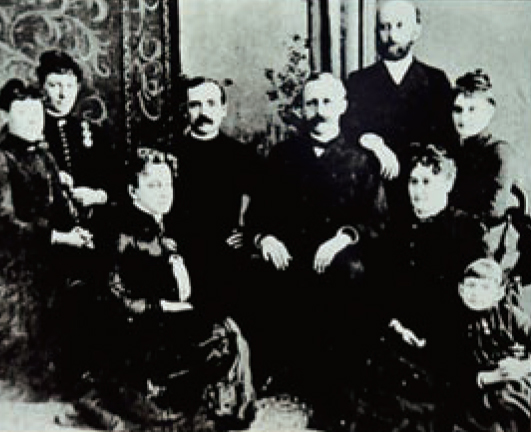
Seminarians in Sendai, 1888, Hoy is standing on far right

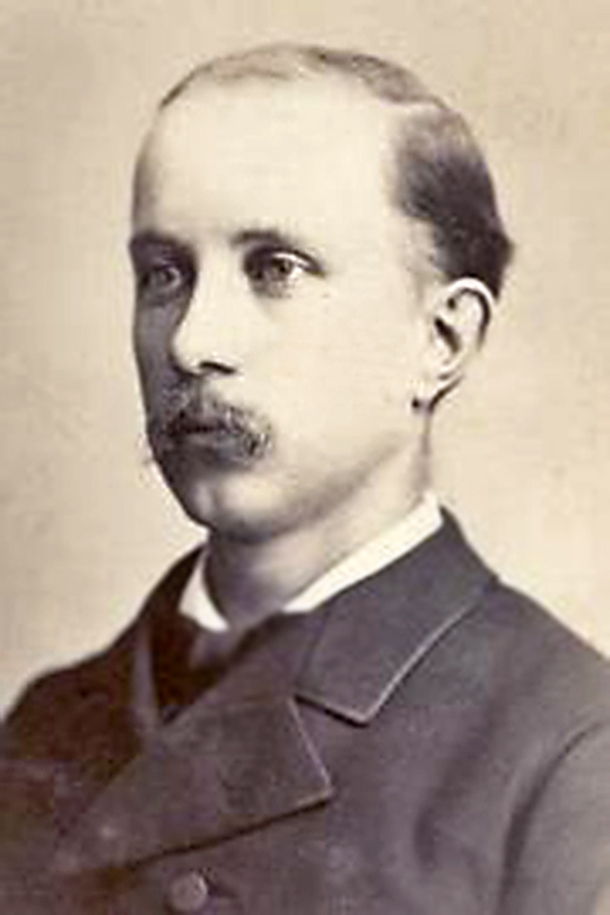
William Edwin Hoy

William Edwin Hoy (June 4, 1858 – March 3, 1927) was a Protestant missionary and educator in Japan and China.

== Early life and education ==
William Edwin Hoy was born near Mifflinburg, Pennsylvania and graduated Franklin and Marshall College in 1882. He was ordained a priest in 1885 by the Lancaster Theological Seminary.

== Career ==
Hoy became a missionary for the Reformed Church in the United States. His first posting was to Japan in 1886. He identified Sendai in northern Japan as strategic and with Reverend Masayoshi Oshikawa started a small school to train Japanese pastors, the Sendai Theological Training School. This later became Tohoku Gakuin University (Northern Japan University). He later started a girls school, the Miyagi Girls' School, which later became Miyagi Gakuin Women's University. Suffering from asthma, and with many responsibilities including an English bimonthly journal, The Japan Evangelist, he took a three-month health furlough in 1898 and traveled to China. "What he saw there fired him with enthusiasm that the Church must go forward in China," and he decided to move to Hunan. Resigning from his Japan post, Hoy relocated to Yueyang in 1901, and started a mission. By 1906 it had grown to have 20 missionaries. The mission was divided into three branches, evangelical, medical and educational, including the first girls school in Yueyang. The hospital built by the mission was named Hoy Memorial Hospital.

In 1914 he authored China Mision:Of the Reformed Church in the United States, describing his missionary experiences in China. He held firm that Christ was only path to salvation, and that Buddhism "converts every Chinese into a spiritual mummy." The book has had many recent reprints.

== Personal life ==
He married a Mary Ault, a teacher at the girls school in Japan. They had six children; their two daughters were also missionaries in China. In 1927 the revolutionary turmoil led him to be evacuated from China. He had a stroke and died aboard ship.
