= Kiyoshi Oshikawa =

Japanese baseball player (1881–1944)

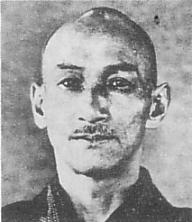
- Born: 1 January 1881; Matsuyama City, Shikoku, Japan
- Died: 18 March 1944 (aged 63)

Member of the Japanese

Baseball Hall of Fame
- Induction: 1959

Kiyoshi Oshikawa (Oshikawa Kiyoshi, 押川清, 1 January 1881 – 18 March 1944) was a Japanese baseball player, executive and the founder of the first Japanese professional baseball team.

== Early life and education ==
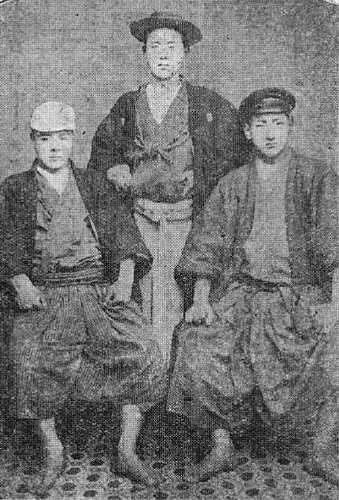
Oshikawa, on the right, in junior high school (Mitsuyo Maeda is on the left)

Oshikawa was born in Matsuyama City (although other sources say Sendai), and grew up in Sendai, Japan, where his father was a Christian minister. He attended Waseda University in Tokyo. After college he was in the Japanese military for a year.

== Baseball career ==
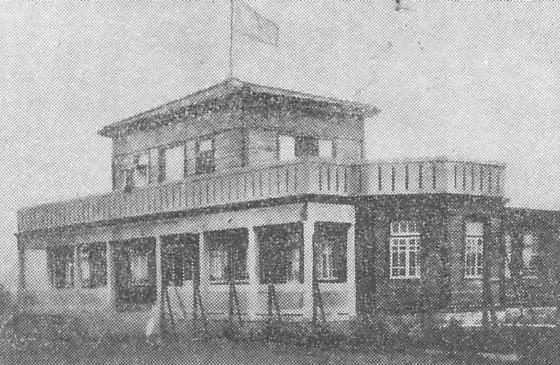
Clubhouse in Shibaura stadium

Oshikawa was a star baseball player at Waseba University and a student of Professor Abe Isō, who has been called the "Father of Japanese baseball." After graduation he played for the Tomon Club, composed of the Waseda Baseball Club's alumni. Oshikawa participated in a 1905 baseball tour of the United States under Abe's leadership, the first tour of the U.S. by a Japanese team. The tour had a strong influence on Oshikawa; because of the cost, they only visited minor league cities on the west coast. He was impressed that "professional baseball players compete against each other to sharpen their skills every day." He adopted the concept of franchise, claiming a city as its base with exclusive right to play in that city, in a stadium built for the team. He said that "a baseball team must have a stadium." Oshikawa was an advocate for baseball and publicly defended the sport, which at the time was viewed as harmful. In 1920 Oshikawa, with two former Waseda classmates, founded the first professional baseball team in Japan, the Nihon Athletic Association (NAA, 日本運動協会). By 1921 there were four teams. Oshikawa's first team was made up of former Waseda players with good academic credentials and excellent personalities, model players. His goals were the development of baseball in Japan, dispel negative attitudes toward the game, and to ensure, through athletic competition, "that the spirit of cooperation and unity, fairness, and cheerful spirit required by the present age will be planted in the human heart." His concept of baseball was consistent with the then existing bushidō spirit of Japan, and he helped define and popularize baseball as bushidō like. The NAA tried to improve physical skills based upon the bushidō concept of self-discipline. The formation of the club was supported by the member inverstments, with a minimum of 500 yen and a maximum of 7500 yen. It was incorporated as a "joint-stock organization" with limited and general partners (including Oshikawa) with a capital of 90,000 yen. Salary was based on education, personality and baseball ability. Money was to be set aside for when players retired. The commercial aspect was not in his bushidō ideology, and this precluded commercial sponsorship. The first priority of the NAA was building a stadium, using the American professional baseball model which he had learned in 1905. He built and managed a stadium for the team in Shibaura, a district in Tokyo. It was located four kilometers from the Imperial Palace, in the center of Tokyo; the expectation was that there would be considerable attendance. This plan collapsed in the wake of the 1923 Great Kantō Earthquake. There was only minor damage to the stadium, but on 1 September 1923, Shibaura Stadium was requisitioned by the Kanto Kaigen Command and the Tokyo City Social Affairs Bureau. It became a supply depot for food and equipment to deal with the earthquake's destruction, and no baseball was played again at the stadium. With no income from tickets and no commercial support, financial distress led to the NAA disbanding in 1924. The team moved to Takarazuka where it reorganized as the Takarazuka Undo Kyokai; in 1929 it ceased operations because of financial problems. All professional baseball in Japan ceased during the depression years of 1929–1934, revived by media mogul Matsutarō Shōriki in late 1934 with an All-star team. Later Oshikawa founded two more baseball teams, Nagoya Army, predecessor of the Chunichi Dragons; and, in 1937 Oshikawa founded the Korakuen Eagles, built a stadium for them and became team president. Oshikawa was one of nine to be in the first group inducted into the Japanese Baseball Hall of Fame in 1959.

== Personal ==
Oshikawa's father was evangelist Masayoshi Oshikawa, who was the model for the NHK drama series "Hanekomo." His brother was Shunro Oshikawa, pioneer science fiction writer. The brothers were teammates on the Waseda baseball team and both were on the seminal 1905 U.S. tour. Several years after Shunro died, Kiyoshi edited a four volume collection of his works. Oshikawa was in the same dormitory at Waseda Junior High as Mitsuyo Maeda, one of the first MMA artists of the modern era and studied with him at the Kodokan Judo Institute. Oshikawa died of esophagal cancer at age 63.
