= Masayoshi Oshikawa =

Japanese Christian evangelist (1850–1928)

Masayoshi Oshikawa (押川方義; 1850–1928) was a Japanese evangelist, political activist and founder and first president of Tohoku Gakuin University.

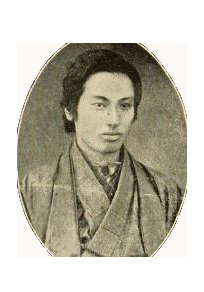
Masayoshi Oshikawa, 1877

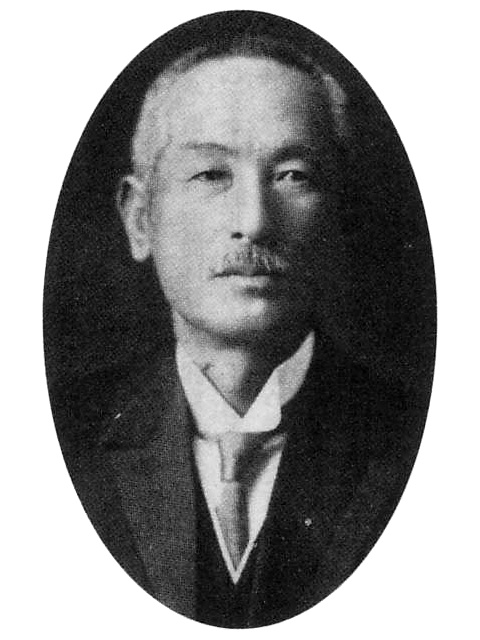
Masayoshi Oshikawa

== Early life and education ==
Masayoshi Oshikawa was born in 1850 in Iyo Province (current Ehime prefecture), the third son of the Hashimoto family, a family of the samurai class, and later adopted at age eleven by the Oshikawa family. In the Japanese feudal adoption tradition the son usually became the son-in-law if the father had a daughter; this was the case in this adoption. At age 18 he married Tsune, the daughter of Masayuke Oshikawa. The father was bitterly opposed to anything foreign; due to this family opposition, he saw his wife only twice in the nine years after his subsequent conversion. A year after his marriage he was sent to Tokyo by a feudal lord for education. He first studied at Kaisei Gakko school of Western learning, a predecessor of Tokyo University. After three years he moved to Yokohama to obtain a better knowledge of English and studied under Christian missionaries, including Samuel Robbins Brown and J.H. Balogh, at an English school, Yokokhama Shubunkan.

== Career ==
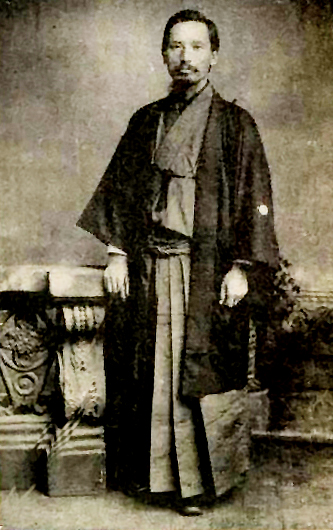
Reverend Masayoshi Oshikawa

While in Yokohama he converted to Christianity in 1872 and started missionary work, founding the Church of Christ in Japan, the first Protestant church in the country. At the time of his conversion there were only six known Protestants in Japan. While preaching in Niigata the city was largely destroyed by a fire in 1878. Having visited Sendai twice over the preceding year, he moved there in 1879. The first year was difficult. Many in the city were hostile to the "Jesus meetings" and he could not rent a house for the meetings. The religion was felt to be for women and children. By 1881 there were 45 church members with a large rented house; by 1885 there were three churches and 200 Christians in Sendai. The work was non-denominational and there was no mission, but donations from local Christians were not enough to expand the local work. He met with William Edwin Hoy, a missionary from the Reformed Church in the United States, in Tokyo in 1885 and invited him to Sendai. In 1886 they co-founded the Sendai Divinity School, a school to train Christian pastors, under the aegis of the Reformed Church. In the face of opposition and starting with six students, the Sendai Divinity School prospered; and, by 1892 it had 17 theological students and 133 other students. It became Tohoku Gakuin University and he became its first president. As early as 1909 it was recognized as one of the most influential Christian institutions in the country. In 1886 he founded Miyagi Gakuin Women's University. In 1887 Oshikawa was voted the first president of the newly created Miyagi Classis, covering the territory of all northern Japan, including Hokkaido. The same year he founded a Christian farming community on Hokkaido with the goal of eventually starting a Christian university; the group dissolved after 14 years. Actively involved in evangelical activities in several places he resigned as president of Tohoku Gakuin in 1891. In 1883, with Tsuda Sen, his was the first Japanese Christian missionary endeavor to Korea. This was a decade before formal Japanese colonial expansion and appeared to be motivated by a Christian transnational cosmopolitanism. He viewed the foreign mission of Japanese Christians as an extension of "Western" Christian missionary activity in Japan; for him the mission was an "obligation." In 1894 with other Christians he established the Greater Japan Overseas Education Society, a strictly Christian organization. They established Japanese language schools in Korea. Although Christian and educational in mission, "it cannot be denied ...that the establishment of these schools was the cornerstone of Japanese influence in Korea." Later activities went beyond Christian mission, and he actively intervened in Asian politics against political oppression in Asia. He supported Emilio Aquinaldo's Philippine war against the United States and the Mongolian independence movement; in 1918 he criticized the Japanese people for their neglect of Japan's responsibility to improve Asian societies.

He had two sons, Shunro, a pioneer of Japanese science fiction, and Kiyoshi, the founder of the first professional baseball team in Japan.

== See also ==
- Tohoku Gakuin
