= Mawson Hotel =

Listed former pub in Manchester, England

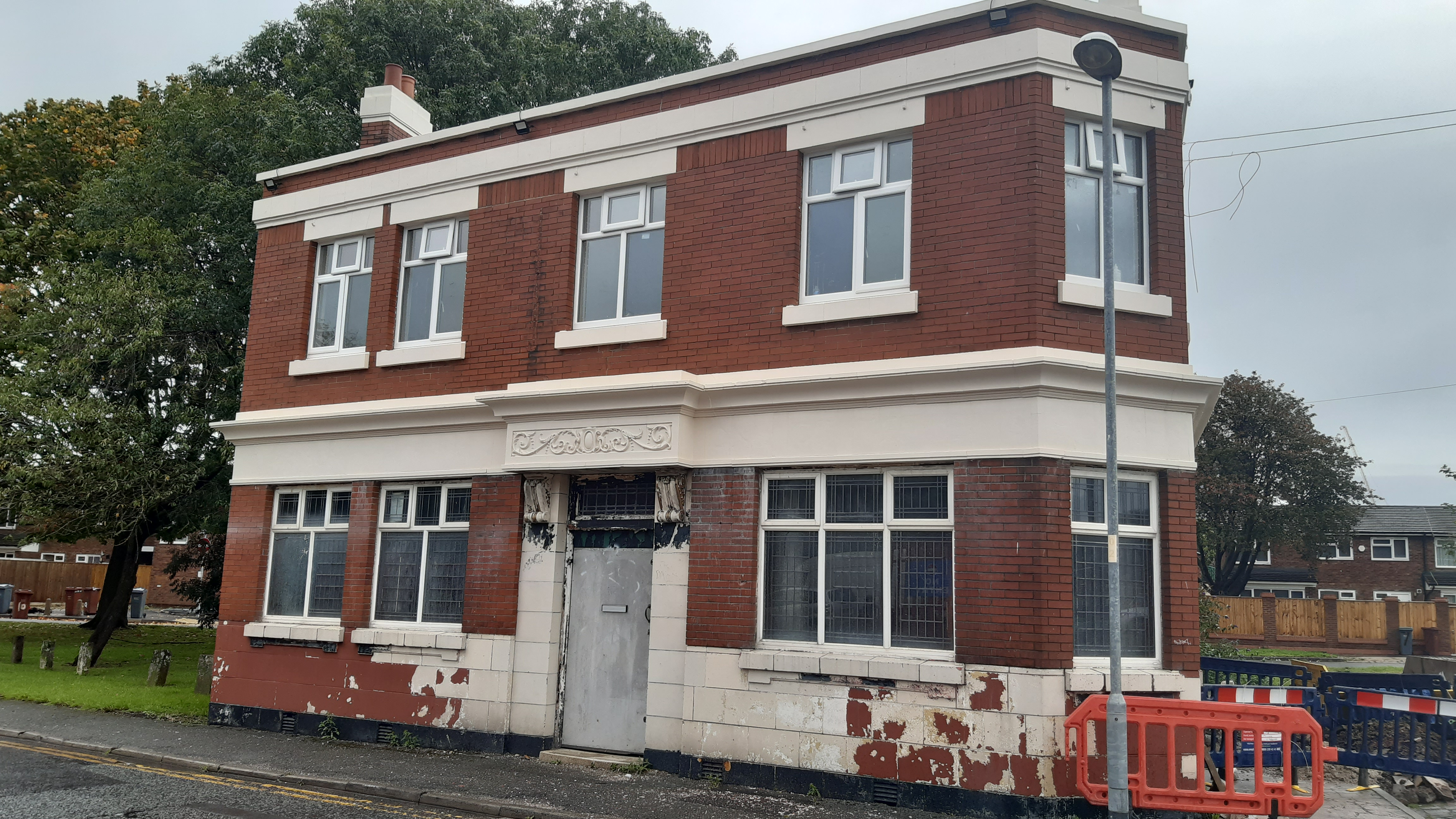
- The former pub in 2019
- Alternative names: The Mawson

General information
- Type: Public house (former)
- Location: 74–80 Frances Street, Chorlton-on-Medlock, Manchester, England
- Coordinates: 53.4681°N 2.2284°W
- Year built: Mid to late 19th century
- Renovated: 1936–37 (rebuilt)
- Closed: 2012

Design and construction
- Designations

Listed Building – Grade II
- Official name: The Mawson Hotel
- Designated: 31 March 2010
- Reference no.: 1393734

The Mawson Hotel (also known as The Mawson) is a Grade II listed former public house on Frances Street in Chorlton-on-Medlock, an inner-city area of Manchester, England. Built in the mid to late 19th century and originally a small hotel, it was amalgamated with two neighbouring houses and rebuilt in 1936–37. It continued in use as a pub until its closure in 2012. A listed building consent application submitted in 2019 for alterations to the property was withdrawn in 2024, and no subsequent proposals for its reuse have been recorded.

== History ==
The building began as a small hotel of the mid to late 19th century. It was later combined with Nos. 74 and 76 Frances Street, and was rebuilt as a public house in 1936–37 to plans prepared by Fred Riley of Brameld & Smith, Manchester, for Joshua Tetley & Son of Leeds.

The Mawson name derives from the Mawson family, who had lived at nearby Ardwick Green in earlier years. The building was originally a Tetley Walker house and was included on the Campaign for Real Ale's National Inventory of Historic Pub Interiors.

On 31 March 2010, the pub was designated a Grade II listed building, and it subsequently closed in 2012.

A planning application for listed building consent for "internal alterations, room sub-division and refurbishment of interior and exterior" was submitted to Manchester City Council in 2019, but was withdrawn in 2024, and no subsequent proposals have been recorded on the council's planning register as of April 2026.

== Architecture ==
The first floor has five‑part wooden windows from the 1930s rebuild, with later uPVC windows in the same pattern on the ground floor, set on black sills with white lintels. The south‑east and south‑west fronts are in Accrington brick on a tall painted faience base, with a deep black faience band carrying a red fascia with "MAWSON" in gold lettering running around both sides and the north‑west return; a 2019 photograph in this article, and imagery from Google Street View in March 2025, show that the sills, faience band, and fascia now appear to have been painted white. Both main fronts have a faience and brick parapet.

The south‑west front to Cabot Street has four bays, with the main entrance in the third bay, a decorative faience surround, and a replacement door with a leaded overlight. The south‑east side to Frances Street has seven bays with a mix of six, five and three‑part windows and two doorways with overlights. The north‑west side is plain brick with matching windows, a small lean‑to and a doorway, and a narrow yard enclosed by a high brick wall. The rear gable is plain brick and appears to be a mid to late 20th‑century rebuild after adjoining housing was demolished.

== See also ==
- Listed buildings in Manchester-M13
- Listed pubs in Manchester
