= Listed buildings in Manchester-M13 =

Manchester is a city in Northwest England. The M13 postcode area is to the south of the centre of the city and includes parts of the districts of Chorlton-on-Medlock and Longsight. The postcode area contains 38 listed buildings that are recorded in the National Heritage List for England. Of these, one is listed at Grade I, the highest of the three grades, seven are at Grade II*, the middle grade, and the others are at Grade II, the lowest grade. The area includes the main buildings of the University of Manchester, some of which are listed, as are some hospitals. The area is otherwise mainly residential, and the other listed buildings include houses, some of which have been converted for other uses, churches and chapels, public houses, former public baths, a museum, a milepost, railings, a statue, and a war memorial.

== Key ==
| Grade | Criteria |
|---|---|
| I | Buildings of exceptional interest, sometimes considered to be internationally important |
| II* | Particularly important buildings of more than special interest |
| II | Buildings of national importance and special interest |

== Buildings ==
| Name and location | Photograph | Date | Notes | Grade |
|---|---|---|---|---|
| Slade Hall; 53.45063°N 2.19696°W | | 1585 | A former manor house, later altered and extended and used for other purposes. It is timber framed on a stone plinth with rear extensions in brick, and a slate roof. Its plan consists of a hall and cross-wings, with a porch in the angle and a further wing added in the 19th century. There are two low storeys, with the upper floor and the gables jettied. Most of the windows are mullioned and transomed. Inside is some exposed timber framing. | II* |
| Milepost, Ardwick Green; 53.47149°N 2.22505°W | | Late 18th century (probable) | The milepost is in stone with a rounded top. It is inscribed with the distances in miles to Manchester, Wilmslow, and London. | II |
| Plymouth Lodge; 53.46512°N 2.22481°W | | Early 19th century | Originally a rectory, later converted into flats, it is in red brick on a stone plinth, with a moulded cornice and blocking course, and a hipped slate roof. There are two storeys and a symmetrical front of two bays. The entrance is on the left side and has a flat-roofed porch, and a doorway with a moulded architrave and a moulded cornice. On the front are two shallow rectangular bay windows, and the other windows are sashes. | II |
| Railings, Ardwick Green; 53.47136°N 2.22301°W | | Early 19th century | The railings enclose the north and west sides of the green. They are in cast iron, and have panelled rectangular standards with obelisk points, and gate piers with ball finials. | II |
| Student Health Centre, University of Manchester; 53.46235°N 2.23004°W | | Early 19th century | Originally three houses, later combined and used for other purposes, it is in stuccoed brick on a plinth, with a band and a hipped slate roof. There are two storeys, a symmetrical front of five bays, and wings at the rear. The central round-headed doorway has a keystone, a cornice and a fanlight, and the windows are sashes. | II* |
| Ukrainian Club; 53.46239°N 2.21063°W | — | Early 19th century | Originally a house, it is in red brick on a stone plinth, with corner pilasters, bands, a moulded eaves gutter, and a slate roof. It has two storeys and a cellar, a double-depth plan, and three bays. Steps lead up to a central doorway with Ionic half-columns, an entablature, a cornice a lettered frieze. The windows are sashes with flat heads. | II |
| Waterloo Place; 53.46697°N 2.23467°W | | 1832 | A row of seven houses, later offices, in red brick on a stone plinth, with some sandstone dressings and slate roofs. They have two storeys with cellars, a double depth plan, rear extensions, and each house has three bays. Nos. 176–182 have added attics with a mansard roof, and the other houses have a moulded eaves cornice. Each house has a round-headed doorway with Tuscan columns, an entablature, a cornice, and a fanlight, and the windows are sashes. | II |
| 323–327 and 333 Oxford Road; 53.46489°N 2.23184°W | | Early to mid-19th century | A row of four houses, later used for other purposes, in stuccoed brick, with a double-depth plan, three storeys with cellars and rear extensions, and slate roofs. No. 323 has five bays, a rusticated ground floor and an altered doorway. Nos. 325 and 327 Have 1 1/2 storeys each; No 325 has a wooden porch with square pillars, and No. 327 has a stone porch with Tuscan columns distyle in antis, and No. 333 has three bays and a recessed doorway with set-in fluted Doric columns. | II |
| Former Unitarian chapel 53.46924°N 2.23139°W | | 1836–1839 | Originally a Unitarian chapel with a Sunday school designed by Charles Barry in Early English style, it has since been used for other purposes. It is in sandstone with a slate roof, and has buttresses and lancet windows along the sides. The west end is gabled with an arched doorway, and flanked by square corner pinnacles. The Sunday school to the north has two storeys, a canted apse, and a lean-to porch. | II* |
| Mrs Gaskell's House; 53.46356°N 2.22110°W | | c. 1838–1840 | A house in stuccoed brick on a plinth, with a sill band, a plain frieze, a moulded cornice, a low parapet, and a hipped slate roof. It is in Classical style, with two storeys and a basement, a symmetrical front of three bays, and an attached coach house. On the front are pilasters with lotus-leaf capitals, and a porch with engaged columns distyle in antis, a frieze and a cornice. The windows are sash windows, the ground floor windows with cornices on consoles. At the rear is a prominent bow window. It was from 1850 the home of the author Elizabeth Gaskell. | II* |
| 2–4 Swinton Grove; 53.46327°N 2.22155°W | | c. 1840 | Originally two houses, later combined into one and used for other purposes, it is in red brick on a plinth, with sandstone dressings, a sill band, a cornice, a blocking course, and a raised pediment in the centre. There are two storeys and a basement, a symmetrical front of three bays, and three bays on the sides. The façade facing the road has a semicircular bow in the outer bays. The entrances are on the sides, and each consists of a recessed porch with Tuscan columns distyle in antis. Some of the windows are sashes, and others are casement windows imitating sashes. | II |
| 60 Nelson Street; 53.46318°N 2.22733°W | | c. 1840 | A house, later incorporated in the Pankhurst Centre, in red brick on a stone plinth, with a modillioned eaves cornice, and a hipped slate roof. There are two storeys and three bays, the central bay projecting forward under a pediment. In this bay is an elliptical-headed doorway with Tuscan columns, an entablature, a cornice, and a fanlight. To the left is a rectangular bay window, and the other windows are sashes with wedge lintels. | II |
| Pankhurst Centre; 53.46313°N 2.22748°W | | c. 1840 | A red brick house on a stone plinth, partly stuccoed, and with a modillioned eaves cornice, and a hipped slate roof. There are two storeys and three bays, the central bay projecting under a pediment. The doorway has an elliptical head and a Tuscan doorcase with an entablature, a cornice, and a fanlight. In the right bay is a canted bay windows, and the other windows are sashes with wedge lintels. It was the home of Emmeline Pankhurst. | II* |
| St John's Church, Longsight; 53.45701°N 2.20291°W | | 1846–47 | The church, which was extended in 1853, is in yellow sandstone with gritstone dressings and slate roofs, and is in Early English style. It consists of a nave with a clerestory, north and south aisles, a south porch, north and south transepts, a chancel with a north vestry, and a southwest steeple. The steeple has a three-stage tower, diagonal buttresses, a canted northwest stair turret, and a broach spire with two tiers of lucarnes. | II |
| Slade Lane Neighbourhood Centre; 53.45416°N 2.19704°W | — | c. 1850 | A house, later used for other purposes, in red brick with dressings in buff brick and sandstone, quoins, and a slate roof. There are two storeys, a double-depth plan, and three bays. The outer bays project forward and have gables with decorative bargeboards and finials. The central arched doorway has a fanlight, and the windows are casements with arched heads and hood moulds. In each gable is a niche with a statue, and the openings have quoined surrounds. | II |
| Mawson Hotel; 53.46800°N 2.22846°W | | Mid to late 19th century | Originally a public house, it was combined with neighbouring houses in 1936–37. The building is in Accrington brick on a plinth, with faience dressings, a moulded cornice above the ground floor, and a slate roof. It has two storeys and a basement, an L-shaped plan, and fronts of four and seven bays. The main doorway has a decorative entablature on consoles and a fanlight. | II |
| Holy Trinity Armenian Apostolic Church and vicarage 53.46236°N 2.22330°W | | 1869–70 | The first Armenian church in England, it is built in sandstone with some buff brick and has slate roofs. The church consists of a polygonal porch, a nave, a semicircular apse, and a rectangular ambulatory. Along the nave are windows with pointed heads, and in the west gable is a rose window. The vicarage, recessed to the left, has two storeys, an attic and basement, and two bays, the right bay containing a doorway, a full-height gable, and a dormer. | II |
| Church of the Holy Name of Jesus; 53.46441°N 2.23110°W | | 1869–1871 | A Roman Catholic church designed by Joseph Hansom in Gothic style, with the tower completed in 1928 by Adrian Gilbert Scott. It is built in sandstone with slate roofs, and consists of a nave, north and south aisles with side chapels, north and south transepts, a polygonal apse, and a west tower. At the west end, the tower has two bays, three stages and buttresses. It contains a doorway with a decorative gable, above which are two-light windows, and a large octagonal top stage with pinnacles and a blind-arcaded parapet. To the right is an octagonal two-stage turret, and along the sides of the church are flying buttresses and gabled projections. | I |
| Victoria University of Manchester; 53.46592°N 2.23374°W | | 1870 | The university buildings were designed by Alfred Waterhouse, with Whitworth Hall added to the south end of the east range by his son, Paul Waterhouse. The buildings are in sandstone and have red tiled roofs. They are arranged around a courtyard, the west range being the earliest, followed by the east and north ranges. They are in Gothic style, and include a large tower at the south end of the east range. Other features include gables, oriel windows, pinnacles, and niches with statues. | II* |
| Burlington Rooms and railings 53.46479°N 2.23518°W | | 1871 | Originally the laboratory of Edward Schunck in Kersal, Salford, and moved to its present site in the University of Manchester in 1904. It is in yellow brick with sandstone dressings, string courses, an eaves cornice, and a slate roof. There are two storeys and a basement and four bays, the first bay having a pedimented gable, and the fourth bay has a clock tower with a pyramidal roof and a weathervane. Steps lead up to a segmental-headed doorway with an inscribed tympanum. In front of the basement area are railings. | II |
| Manchester University laboratories 53.46494°N 2.23465°W | — | 1871–1873 | The earliest laboratory and the Schorlemmer Laboratory that followed in 1895 were designed by Alfred Waterhouse, and the 1904 polygonal laboratory and the 1909 John Morley Laboratories were designed by his son Paul Waterhouse, for the University of Manchester, with the guidance of Henry Roscoe. | II |
| Plymouth Grove Hotel; 53.46453°N 2.22317°W | | 1873 | The former public house is in red brick with sandstone dressings, a sill band, pilasters, and a shaped parapet with a raised inscribed centre. The main block is square with three storeys and cellars, and three bays. There is a first-floor balcony with cast iron railings over a loggia which on the right side contains an ornamental clock tower. The main entrance on the front is flanked by columns, and the windows have segmental heads, those on the top floor with small balconies. | II |
| Holy Name presbytery 53.46484°N 2.23079°W | | 1874 | The presbytery to the Church of the Holy Name of Jesus was designed by Henry Clutton with Tudor motifs, and is in orange brick with sandstone dressings, bands, parapets that are partly balustraded, and slate roofs. It has an L-shaped plan, and is mainly in three storeys, with a single-storey projection to the street, and splayed corners. The doorway has a moulded surround, and the windows are mullioned and transomed. | II |
| Faculty of Economic and Social Studies and railings 53.46547°N 2.23058°W | | 1881–1886 | Originally the High School for Girls, later part of the University of Manchester, it is in red brick with sandstone dressings and a slate roof. The building has an F-shaped plan with a main block and two rear wings, it has two or three storeys with cellars, and a four-storey tower. The tower has a round-headed entrance with a moulded surround, a bracketed eaves cornice, and a saddleback roof with ridge cresting. To the right of the tower are seven bays with buttresses, and wrought iron railings enclosing the basement area. To the left, the features include a two-storey canted oriel window, and a gabled bay with a smaller oriel window. | II |
| St Agnes' Church, Longsight; 53.45035°N 2.19778°W | | 1884–85 | The church, designed by J. Medland and Henry Taylor in Arts and Crafts style, is in speckled brick with dressings in red brick and a red tiled roof. It consists of a nave, a south porch, a canted west window, a north aisle with an apsidal baptistry at the west and a two-storey transept at the east end, two south chapels, and a chancel with a triangular apse. On the roof is a bellcote with a flèche at the junction of the nave and the chancel, and on the south side is a gabled dormer. | II |
| Royal Eye Hospital; 53.46207°N 2.22888°W | | 1884–1886 | The hospital is in red brick with red terracotta dressings and red tiled roofs, and is in Queen Anne style. It has a U-shaped plan, there are three storeys with basements and attics, and a symmetrical front of 17 bays. Features include single-bay canted stair turrets, oeil-de-boeuf windows, pediments with finials, balustraded balconies, and fluted friezes decorated with sunflowers. | II |
| Rutherford Building and Hopkinson memorial wing 53.46605°N 2.23473°W | | 1898–1901 | The building, which is part of Manchester University, has an L-shaped plan, with two and three storeys and a basement, and a front of eight bays. The entrance has a porch with an arched doorway, a five-light fanlight and a pediment, flanked by octagonal columns with cupolas. The windows are mullioned and transomed. | II |
| Victoria Baths; 53.46007°N 2.21637°W | | 1903–1906 | Public baths in red brick with buff terracotta dressings, and slate roofs with glass skylights The building consists of a front range and three parallel bath halls at the rear. The front range has a main block with 2 1/2 storeys and five bays, flanked by single-storey three-bay wings, all over basements. In the centre of the roof is a clock turret. Other features include decorative gables, a canted bay window, round-headed windows and doorways on the ground floor, cross-windows on the upper floor, Venetian-style windows in the gables, and dormers with segmental pediments. The forecourt is enclosed by walls with wrought iron gates. | II* |
| Former lodge, Manchester Royal Infirmary, railings and gate piers 53.46110°N 2.22824°W | | 1905–1908 | The former lodge is in red brick on a stone plinth with dressings in Portland stone, quoins, a frieze and a cornice with cresting. It is in Edwardian Baroque style, with two storeys and a symmetrical front of three bays. In the centre is a round-arched entrance with voussoirs and a triple keystone with a mask, framed by paired Ionic columns with blocked shafts, niches with bowls, and an entablature with the Royal Arms above. In the outer bays are windows, and in front of the lodge are four pairs of rusticated gate piers and spearheaded railings. | II |
| Former Outpatients Department, Manchester Royal Infirmary, lodge and railings 53.46255°N 2.22766°W | | 1905–1908 | The building is in red brick with dressings and bands in Portland stone, and a slate roof. It has a single storey, and facing the road is a five-bay Doric loggia, above which is a pediment containing a thermal window, and flanked by a balustraded parapet. On the roof is a domed flèche with columns. Along the side are nine bays with arched windows, and in front is a lodge in similar style and railings. | II |
| Manchester Royal Infirmary (part); 53.46116°N 2.22791°W | | 1905–1908 | This part of the hospital is in red brick with limestone dressings and slate roofs, and is in Edwardian Baroque style. It consists of three long ranges, with a central tower, and a tower at the north end. The main range has a rusticated ground floor, giant Ionic pilasters, quoins, a frieze and a modillioned cornice. The central tower has a clock face, oculi, and a domed roof. The north tower is in Baroque style, with colonnades and a domed roof. | II |
| Former Dental Hospital; 53.46656°N 2.23434°W | | 1908 | The dental hospital, later used by the University of Manchester for other purposes, was designed by Charles Henry Heathcote in Edwardian Baroque style. It is in red brick with limestone dressings and a hipped roof in slate and glass. There are three storeys and an attic, and a symmetrical front of three bays, with quoins, a modillioned cornice, and a parapet. To the right is a full-height semicircular bay. In the middle bay is a semicircular porch with Ionic columns, an entablature with a cornice, and a half-domed roof, and at the top of the bay is an open segmental pediment with a cartouche. | II |
| St Mary's Hospital; 53.45968°N 2.22742°W | | 1909 | The block of the hospital facing Oxford Road is in red brick with terracotta dressings, a band, a modillioned cornice, a balustraded parapet, and slate roofs. It has an E-shaped plan, with three ward blocks extending from the rear. The main block has three storeys with a basement and seven bays, the end bays canted. The central entrance has paired fluted Tuscan columns, a triglyph frieze, and a segmental pediment, and contains a round-headed doorway with voussoirs and a keystone. The third and fifth bays are gabled with segmental pediments and finials, and the end bays have octagonal turrets with domed roofs. | II |
| Samuel Alexander Building; 53.46437°N 2.23352°W | | 1911–1919 | The building, which is part of the University of Manchester, was designed by Percy Worthington, and is in red Ruabon brick and Portland stone, with a slate roof. It has an E-shaped plan, with two storeys and a basement, and rear wings. In the centre is an entrance that has a portico with Roman Doric columns, an entablature with an inscribed frieze, and a triangular pediment. The portico is flanked by two-storey five-bay wings that have recessed upper floors with balustrades, beyond which are three-storey pavilions. The windows are sashes. | II |
| Manchester Museum extensions 53.46632°N 2.23416°W | | 1911–1927 | The museum extensions were designed by Paul Waterhouse in Gothic Revival style. They are built in sandstone with roofs of lead and red tiles, and are in three portions. The left portion has two storeys and five bays, with an embattled parapet, a hipped roof with a flèche, and gablets in the end bays. To the left is a two-storey entrance archway with a porter's lodge. The middle portion has two lower storeys, three bays and a gabled centre. The right portion is a cross-wing with the gable facing the road. It has four storeys with an attic, and octagonal corner tourelles with arcaded pinnacles. Below is a gabled porch and a seven-light window with Perpendicular tracery. | II |
| Edward VII statue 53.45956°N 2.22831°W | | 1913 | The statue in Whitworth Park commemorates Edward VII and is by John Cassidy. It has a rectangular plan with a base, a stepped and moulded plinth, and a pedestal, all in granite. On the pedestal is a bronze statue of the king, standing and holding the sceptre and the orb. | II |
| St Joseph's Church, Longsight; 53.46097°N 2.21232°W | | 1914–15 | A Roman Catholic church in glazed red brick with red sandstone dressings and a slate roof. It is in Arts and Crafts style, and consists of a nave with a clerestory, north and south aisles, a north porch, narthex and baptistry, a chancel and a northeast tower. The tower is tall and square, with diagonal buttresses, a five-sided stair turret, and an arched doorway above which is a niche containing a statue. At the top is a steep pyramidal roof, gargoyles, and corner turrets. | II |
| War memorial 53.47194°N 2.22633°W | | Early 1920s | The war memorial in Ardwick Green park is in Portland stone. It has a square plan and consists of three steps, a plinth, a tall pedestal with Ionic columns on the corners, an entablature with a lettered frieze, and a dentilled cornice with a scrolled blocking course. On the plinth is a carved sphinx and on the pedestal are festoons and inscriptions relating to both World Wars. | II |
