= Manchester University Press =

British university press

- Logo
- Parent company: University of Manchester
- Founded: 1904
- Founder: James Tait
- Headquarters location: Manchester, England
- Distribution: NBN International (UK books); Oxford University Press (Americas books); Footprint Books (Australia books); Turpin Distribution (Worldwide journals)
- Publication types: Books, academic journals
- Official website: manchesteruniversitypress.co.uk

Manchester University Press is the university press of the University of Manchester, England, and a publisher of academic books and journals. Manchester University Press has developed into an international publisher. It maintains its links with the University.

== Publishing ==
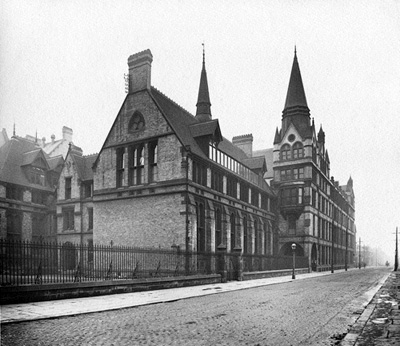
Old Medical School on Coupland Street (photographed in 1908), one of the buildings which have housed the Press

Manchester University Press publishes monographs and textbooks for academic teaching in higher education. In 2012 it was producing about 145 new books annually and managed a number of journals.

Areas of expertise are history, politics and international law, literature and theatre studies, and visual culture.

MUP books are marketed and distributed by Oxford University Press in the United States and Canada, and in Australia by Footprint Books; all other global territories are covered from Manchester itself. Some of the press's books were formerly published in the US by Barnes & Noble, Inc., New York. Later the press established an American office in Dover, New Hampshire.

=== Open access ===
Manchester University Press has been actively involved in open access. It is one of thirteen publishers to participate in the Knowledge Unlatched pilot, a global library consortium approach to funding open access books.

== History ==
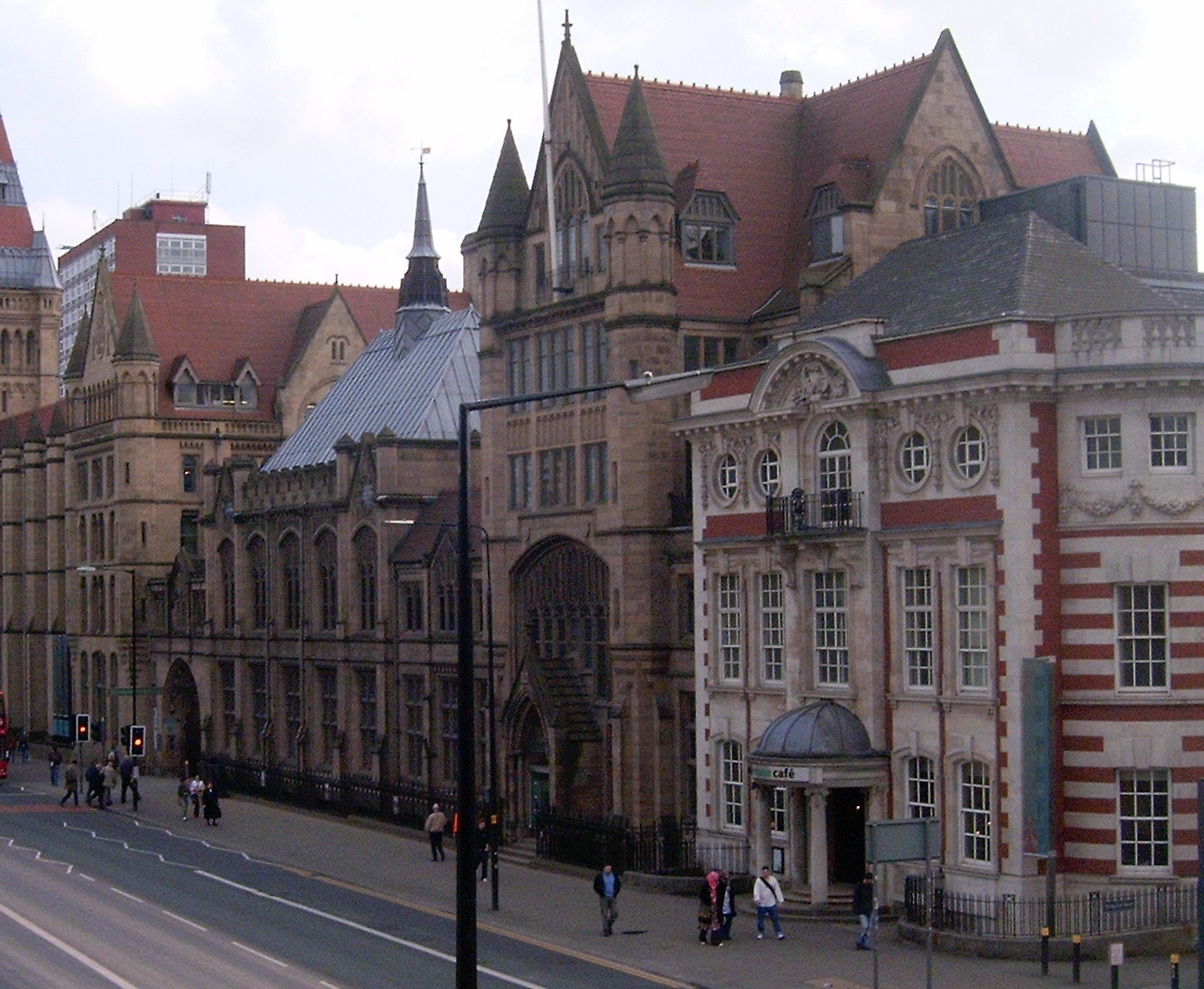
Oxford Road frontage of the Manchester Museum (the Baroque style building in the foreground is the former Dental Hospital)

MUP was founded in 1904 (as the Publications Committee of the University), initially to publish academic research being undertaken at the Victoria University of Manchester. The office was accommodated in a house in Lime Grove. Distribution was then in the hands of Sherratt & Hughes of Manchester; from 1913 the distributors were Longmans, Green & Co. though this arrangement came to an end in the 1930s. (Only 17 publications had been issued under its imprint in the first year.)

MUP was founded by James Tait. His successor was Thomas Tout and between them they were in charge for the first 20 years of the Press's existence. H. M. McKechnie was secretary to the press from 1912 to 1949.

The MUP offices moved several times to make way for other developments within the university. Since 1951 these have been Grove House, Oxford Road, then the former University Dental Hospital of Manchester (illustrated) and until the present time the Manchester Medical School in Coupland Street.
