= Sunny Lowry =

British swimmer (1911–2008)

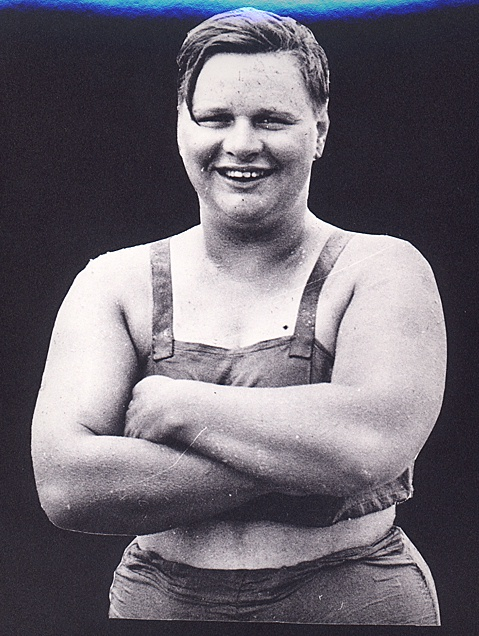
- Born: Ethel Lowry; 2 January 1911; Longsight, Manchester, Lancashire, England, United Kingdom
- Died: 21 February 2008 (aged 97); Warrington, England, United Kingdom
- Known for: Swimming the English Channel

Ethel "Sunny" Lowry MBE (2 January 1911, in Longsight, Manchester, Lancashire – 21 February 2008) was credited with becoming the first British woman to swim the English Channel in 1933, although Mercedes Gleitze was actually the first British woman to swim the channel, in 1927.

== Life ==
Lowry, a student at Manchester High School for Girls and a keen swimmer from a young age, joined the Victoria Ladies Swimming Club of Victoria Baths, Longsight, Manchester. At that time (c. 1920) Victoria Baths only offered single-sex swimming sessions and therefore Sunny was unable to compete against the men. She was developing an aptitude for long-distance swimming and used to train with her sister at Levenshulme baths so that she could attempt distance swimming competitions in Windermere. She also practised distance swimming in the sea at her parents’ holiday home in Rhos-on-Sea in North Wales. On one occasion she swam from her home to Colwyn Bay and back again.

Her father, noticing her increasing talent for distance swimming in the sea suggested that she train for her ambition to swim the Channel. She did this by choosing Westgate on Sea near Margate in Kent as an appropriate venue.

Sunny's trainer in Kent was Jabez Woolffe who had put her on a high protein diet (including eating 40 eggs a week in omelettes). She trained for 3 or 4 hours a day in the buildup to her first attempt.

Her first attempt was from England to France and took place on 10 August 1932. She got quite close to the French coast but eventually the strong east–west currents from France prevented her from finishing. Wolffe and Captain Courtez, the captain of the support tug "Isobelle", called off the attempt. It still took them 45 minutes before they could find her to help her out of the water. Eventually lightning flashes allowed them to see her red swimming cap.

On 27 July 1933, Lowry attempted the swim again only this time choosing to let the current help her instead of hindering her. Accordingly, she changed direction and made the swim from France to England. Unfortunately once again she was unsuccessful.

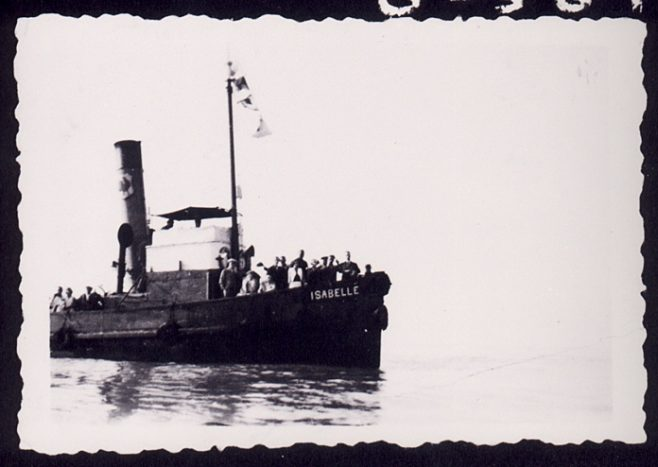
Sunny Lowry's pilot boat "Isabelle"

Making her third attempt on 28 August 1933, Sunny, aged 22, successfully swam from Cap Gris Nez in France to St Margarets Bay, Dover; the swim took her 15 hours 41 minutes. Once again she was supported by Wolffe and Courtez.

Lowry had a reputation for strong-mindedness, which was demonstrated by her eschewing the traditional heavy wool one-piece swimsuit in favour of a, at the time very daring, lighter two-piece suit. For this she was berated as being a "harlot" for baring her knees. This swimsuit is now on display at the Dover Museum "Swimming The Channel" exhibition.

Lowry is one of only five British women to have ever successfully swum the Channel. At the age of 94, in the 2005 Honours list, she was awarded an MBE for services to swimming in the North-West. In July 2003, at the age of 92, Sunny was inducted into the International Marathon Swimming Association's Hall of Fame. She died at the age of 97 on 21 February 2008 at Warrington Hospital.

== See also ==
- Gertrude Ederle
- Notable English Channels swims – which lists Mercedes Gleitze as the first British woman to swim the channel in 1927 citing the Oxford DNB.
