= Victoria University of Manchester =

British university (1851–2004)

- Arms of the Victoria University of Manchester, adopted 1871
- Former name: Owens College
- Motto: Latin: Arduus ad solem
- Motto in English: Striving towards the sun
- Type: Public
- Active: 12 March 1851–1 October 2004
- Location: Manchester, England, UK; 53.4675°N 2.2325°W
Colours
Scarf: Blue, green white

The Victoria University of Manchester, usually referred to as simply the University of Manchester, was a university in Manchester, England. It was founded in 1851 as Owens College. In 1880, the college joined the federal Victoria University. After the break-up of the Victoria University, it gained an independent university charter in 1904 as the Victoria University of Manchester.

On 1 October 2004, the Victoria University of Manchester merged with the University of Manchester Institute of Science and Technology (UMIST) to form a new, larger entity named the University of Manchester.

== History ==
=== 1851–1951 ===
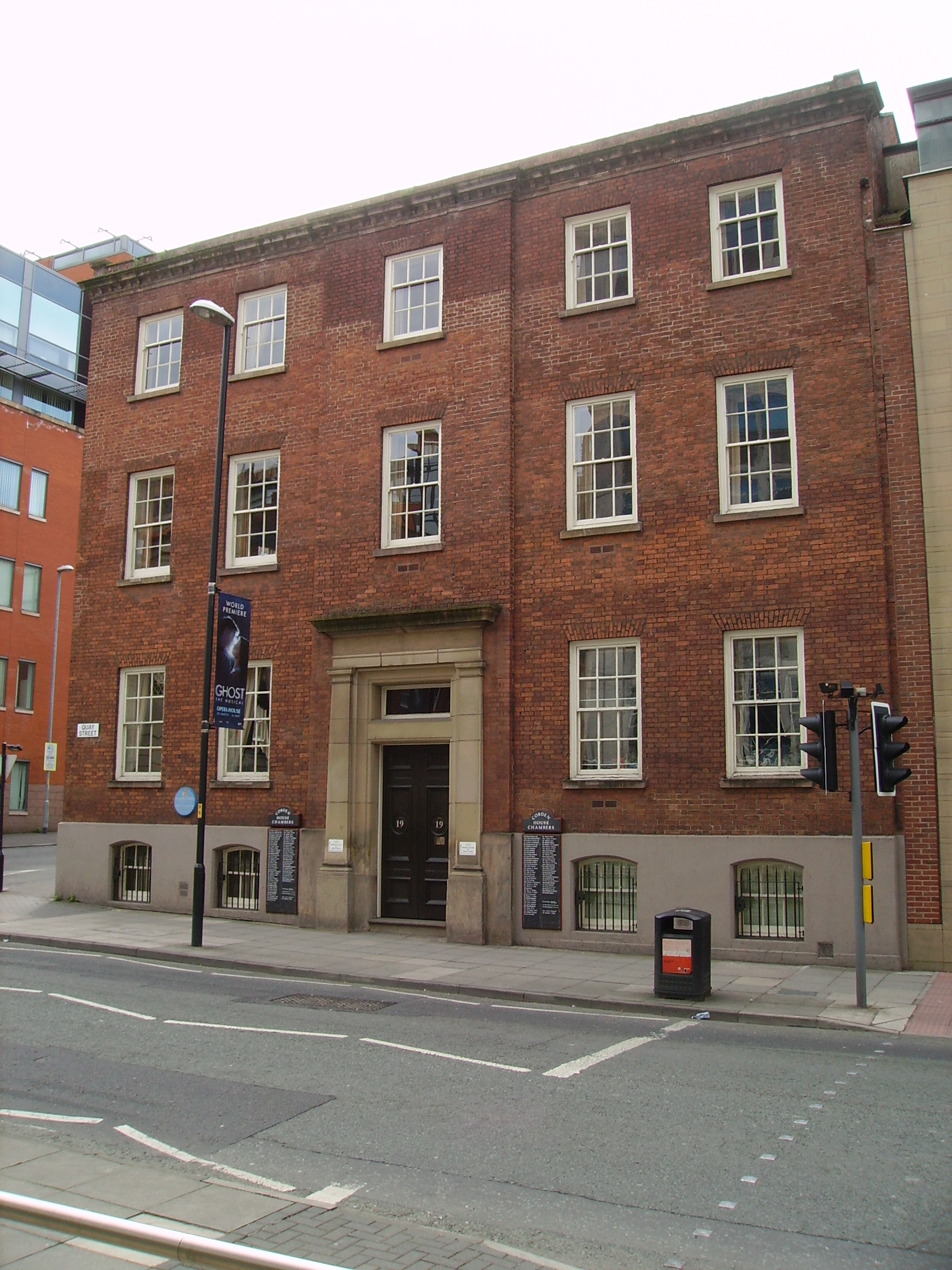
Cobden's House, Quay Street

Owens College was founded in 1851, named after John Owens, a textile merchant, who left a bequest of £96,942 for the purpose. Its first accommodation was at Cobden House on Quay Street, Manchester, in a house which had been the residence of Richard Cobden. In 1859, Owens College was approved as a provincial examination centre for matriculation candidates of the University of London. As the college progressed the premises became inadequate so a move to Chorlton on Medlock was planned in 1871. Alfred Waterhouse was the architect of the new college building, west of Oxford Road, which was opened in 1873. (Note: Both buildings still exist: the Quay Street house has been adapted to many purposes, recently as offices for solicitors. The college building by Waterhouse is described in the article on the University of Manchester.)

Owens College became the first affiliate college of the federal Victoria University in 1880. In 1884, University College Liverpool also joined the Victoria University, followed in 1887 by the Yorkshire College in Leeds. In 1903, University College Liverpool left the Victoria University to become the independent University of Liverpool; Leeds followed in 1904 to become the University of Leeds.

The new Victoria University of Manchester was established by royal charter on 15 July 1903; the university and Owens College were merged by the Victoria University of Manchester Act 1904 (4 Edw. 7. c. xiii) on 24 June 1904.

The ceremonial head of the university was the chancellor who was elected by the convocation of the university, a body of which all graduates were members. The chancellors included Earl Spencer, the Earl of Crawford and Balcarres, and Viscount Morley of Blackburn.

The Manchester University Press was founded by James Tait in 1904 (as the Publications Committee of the University), initially to publish academic research being undertaken at the Victoria University of Manchester. The office was accommodated in a house in Lime Grove. Distribution was then in the hands of Sherratt & Hughes of Manchester; from 1913 the distributors were Longmans, Green & Co. though this arrangement came to an end in the 1930s. The MUP offices moved several times to make way for other developments within the university. Since 1951 these have been Grove House, Oxford Road, then the former University Dental Hospital of Manchester (illustrated) and until the present time the Manchester Medical School in Coupland Street.

=== 1951–2004 ===
In the mid-1960s the university and the city corporation commissioned Hugh Wilson and Lewis Womersley to produce a new plan for the campus. The final report was issued in 1966; it recommended removing traffic from Oxford Road to the adjacent main routes east and west, and building of the Precinct Centre – subsequently constructed in 1970–1972. The Precinct Centre building included the oldest part of the Manchester Business School, Devonshire House and Crawford House and St Peter's House, the University Chaplaincy. It stood on Booth Street East and Booth Street West and Oxford Road ran through it at ground level. The architects were Wilson & Womersley, in association with the university's planning officer, H. Thomas; for St Peter's House the architects were Cruickshank & Seward. (Note: There were also shops at ground level and first floor level and in the early years there was a branch public library.) The Precinct Centre was the largest public building completed in the campus redevelopment, containing office and shopping space, a pub, library and post office amongst other town centre facilities, designed to separate pedestrians from traffic.

The Precinct Centre was demolished in August 2015 as part of Manchester University's £50m redevelopment of Manchester Business School.

On 5 March 2003 it was announced that the university was to merge with UMIST on 1 October 2004, to form the largest conventional university in the UK, the University of Manchester, following which the Victoria University of Manchester and UMIST would cease to exist. The new university was inaugurated on 1 October 2004.

The university had more than 18,000 full-time students (including 2500 international students from more than 120 countries) by the time it merged with UMIST. It was regarded as one of the top universities in the country, frequently achieving top ratings for research.

== Officers ==
See also Category:Vice-chancellors of the Victoria University of Manchester

The chief officers of the university were the vice-chancellor, the registrar, the bursar and the librarian. In later years many administrative changes were made that increased the independence of the Director of Estates and Services, the Director of the Manchester Computing Centre, and eventually combined the offices of registrar and bursar as that of registrar and secretary, the last holder of this post was Eddie Newcomb (1995–2004).

== Notable people ==
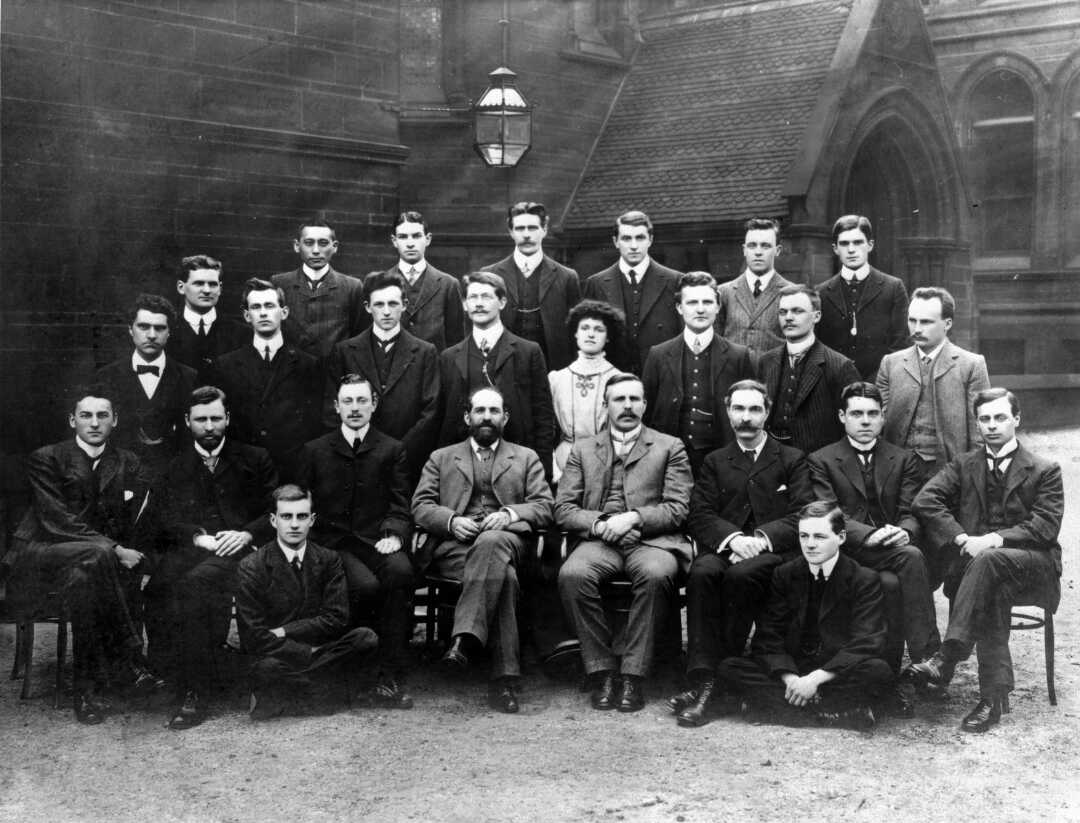
Members of the Victoria Manchester University physical and electro-technical laboratories staff, 1910, including Ernest Marsden, back, second from right; William Wilson, middle row, third from left; Hans Geiger, middle row, second from right; Herbert Stansfield, seated, second from left; Professors Arthur Schuster and Ernest Rutherford, seated, centre.

In the early decades of Owens College, a few outstanding faculty members set high standards for the new institution. These included statistician Stanley Jevons, jurist James Bryce, William Eyre Walker (Art Master) and particularly Henry Enfield Roscoe Professor of Chemistry and Principal of the college. It educated the young J. J. Thomson before he went to Trinity College, Cambridge as well as the future Bulgarian economist and politician Ivan Geshov.

Since the later 1800s, many notable people have worked and studied at the Victoria University of Manchester as, for example, Benedict Cumberbatch, Rik Mayall and Adrian Edmondson.

== Motto and arms ==
The motto of the university was Arduus ad solem, meaning "striving towards the sun". It is a metaphor for aspiring to enlightenment. It is quoted from Virgil's Aeneid, Book II, and the archives do not record the reasons for its choice. The original verse refers to a serpent and the sun, both of which featured in the university coat of arms. The serpent is traditionally associated with wisdom. The arms were granted in October 1871 to Owens College while the Victoria University had arms of its own which fell into abeyance from 1904 upon the merger of the college with the University.

According to Norman Marlow (A. N. Marlow, Senior Lecturer in Latin, Department of Classics at the university in the 1960s), the motto Arduus ad solem – taken from Aeneid II – was a play on words, relating to Manchester's geographical situation. The Virgilian context referred to Pyrrhus, appearing in shining armour 'like a snake which has sloughed its skin, reaching upwards with an effort towards the sun'; the motto was chosen by the Professor of Latin at the time (Augustus Wilkins) and the coat of arms was applied for – suggesting both the idea of the institution striving towards excellence, and the city (with its particularly high annual rainfall) 'reaching upwards with difficulty towards the sun'.

The emblem of the university in use for a number of years (last used September 2004) was based on the archway into the quadrangle from Oxford Road, where there are two coats of arms, of the Victoria University and the Victoria University of Manchester, flanking the gates.

== See also ==
- Armorial of UK universities
- Victoria University
- The University of Manchester
- List of modern universities in Europe (1801–1945)
- Listed buildings in Manchester-M13
