= Slade Hall =

Manor house in Manchester, England

- Location within Greater Manchester

General information
- Location: Slade Lane, Longsight, Manchester, England
- Coordinates: 53.4506°N 2.1969°W
- Year built: 1585
- Renovated: 19th century (wing added)

Technical details
- Floor count: 2

Design and construction
- Designations

Listed Building – Grade II*
- Official name: Slade Hall
- Designated: 25 February 1952
- Reference no.: 1254632

Old drawing of Slade Hall showing the east front

Slade Hall is a small Elizabethan manor house on Slade Lane in Longsight, an inner city area of Manchester, England. An inscription above the porch dates the building to 1585. The mansion is recorded in the National Heritage List for England as a designated Grade II* listed building.

== History ==
Slade, known anciently as Milkwall Slade, was an estate comprising 24 acres (9.7 ha) in Rusholme and 20 acres (8.1 ha) in Gorton, both in Manchester, England. From about the mid-13th century until the reign of Elizabeth I, it was held by a family who adopted Slade as their surname. They sold the estate to the Siddall family, who in 1583 began construction of Slade Hall. Work was completed by 1585, as evidenced by an inscription on a beam over the porch, which also bears the initials of the builder, "E. S." for Edward Siddall. The Siddalls and their descendants occupied the house for the next 300 years.

On 25 February 1952, Slade Hall was designated a Grade II* listed building.

The hall was offered for sale at auction in 2002 and was bought by a property developer for £527,000. By that time, the building had already been restored and divided into shared accommodation for 14 residents. In the early 1990s, it served as the registered office of the Partington Housing Association.

== Architecture ==
Slade Hall is an Elizabethan timber-framed house on a stone base, built to a hall-and-cross-wing plan. (Note: A cross-wing describes a "Wing attached to the hall-range of a medieval house, its axis at right angles to the hall-range, and often gabled.") There are brick extensions to the rear, a slate roof, and a 19th-century wing added to the right of the original structure. It is of two storeys, the upper storey being jettied.

The stud-and-rail timber frame has zig-zag herringbone bracing between the constructional timbers. A porch in the angle between the main gable and the southern wing has painted lozenges resembling quatrefoils. The main hall has two first-floor four-light wooden mullioned casements; the range to the left has a restored fourteen-light mullion and transom window, with a three-light window immediately to its right. The range of the cross-wing on the right has ten-light mullion and transom windows at the ground floor and twelve-lights at the first floor.

The interior retains exposed timberwork showing the house's original construction. Plaster friezes remain visible in the first-floor chamber above the hall, described by architectural historian Norman Redhead as "crude 16th-century stuff". They depict mainly heraldic motifs, including the Elizabethan coat of arms and the Siddall family's crest, as well as an "entertaining" hunting scene.

== See also ==
- Grade II* listed buildings in Greater Manchester
- Listed buildings in Manchester-M13
