= Longsight railway station =

Former railway station in England

Longsight

General information
- Location: Longsight, Manchester; England
- Coordinates: 53.4602°N 2.2014°W
- Grid reference: SJ868959
- Platforms: 2

Other information
- Status: Disused

History
- Original company: Manchester and Birmingham Railway
- Pre-grouping: London and North Western Railway
- Post-grouping: London, Midland and Scottish Railway

Key dates
- April 1843: Station opened
- 15 September 1958: Station closed
Location

Longsight railway station was built by the Manchester & Birmingham Railway Company (MBR).

== History ==
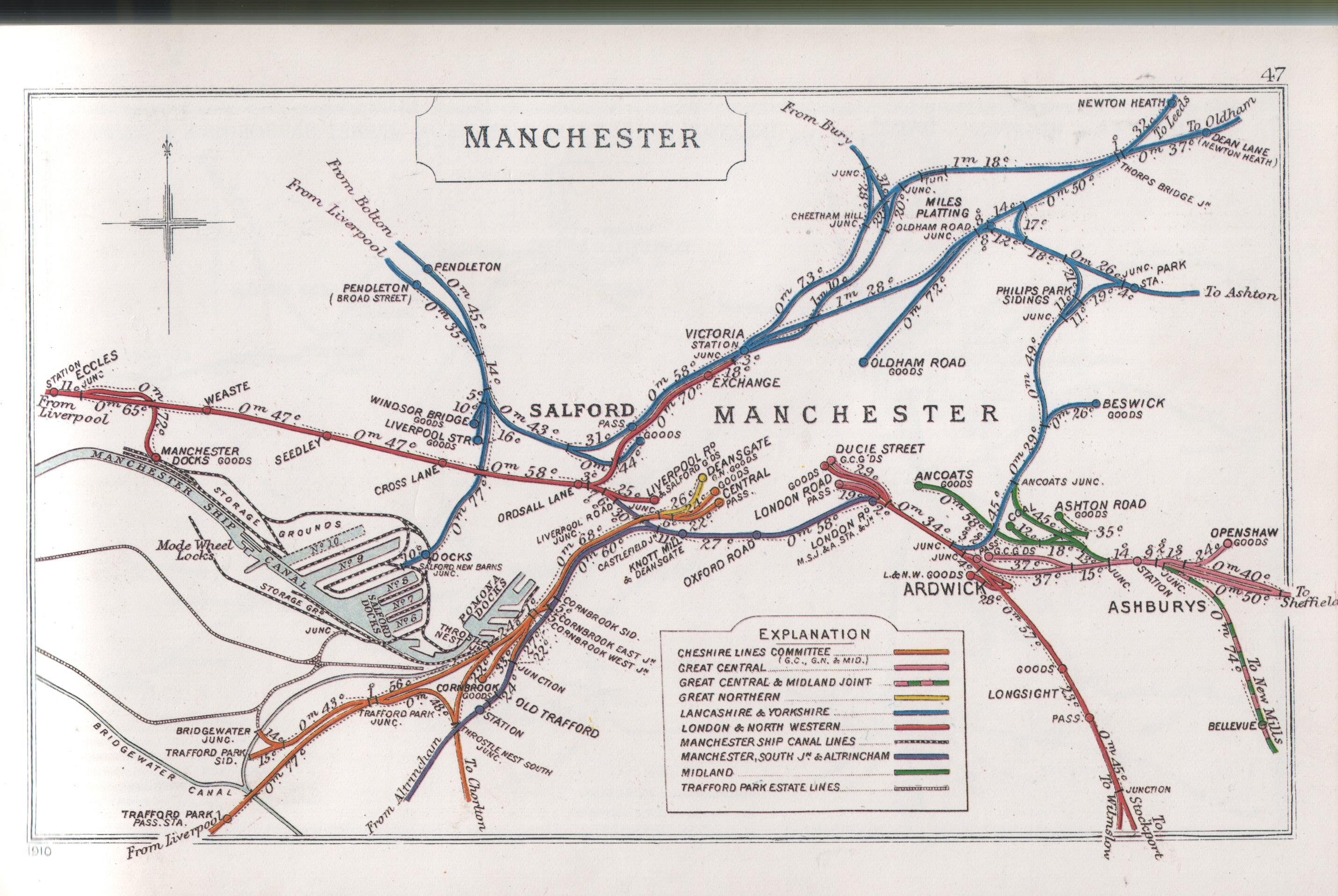
A 1910 Railway Clearing House Junction Diagram showing railways in the vicinity of Longsight (lower right)

The first station in the area was called Rushford which opened with the line in 1840. It closed in 1843 and was replaced with Longsight.

The station opened in April 1843, and became very important to the early success of Belle Vue Zoo as it was close enough to be a drop-off point for organised excursions. A special platform, some 1,500 feet (457 metres) in length was constructed for these trains, much of which can still be seen among the depot sidings. The station closed on 15 September 1958, and very little is left of it today. A short platform has been built on part of the former station site for use of railway staff travelling to and from the adjacent carriage depot.

Preceding station	Historical railways	Following station
Mauldeth Road; Line and station open	London and North Western Railway	Manchester Mayfield; Line and station closed
Levenshulme; Line and station open	London and North Western Railway	Manchester London Road; Line and station open
