= Longsight =

Suburb of Manchester, England

Coordinates: 53.456°N 2.200°W

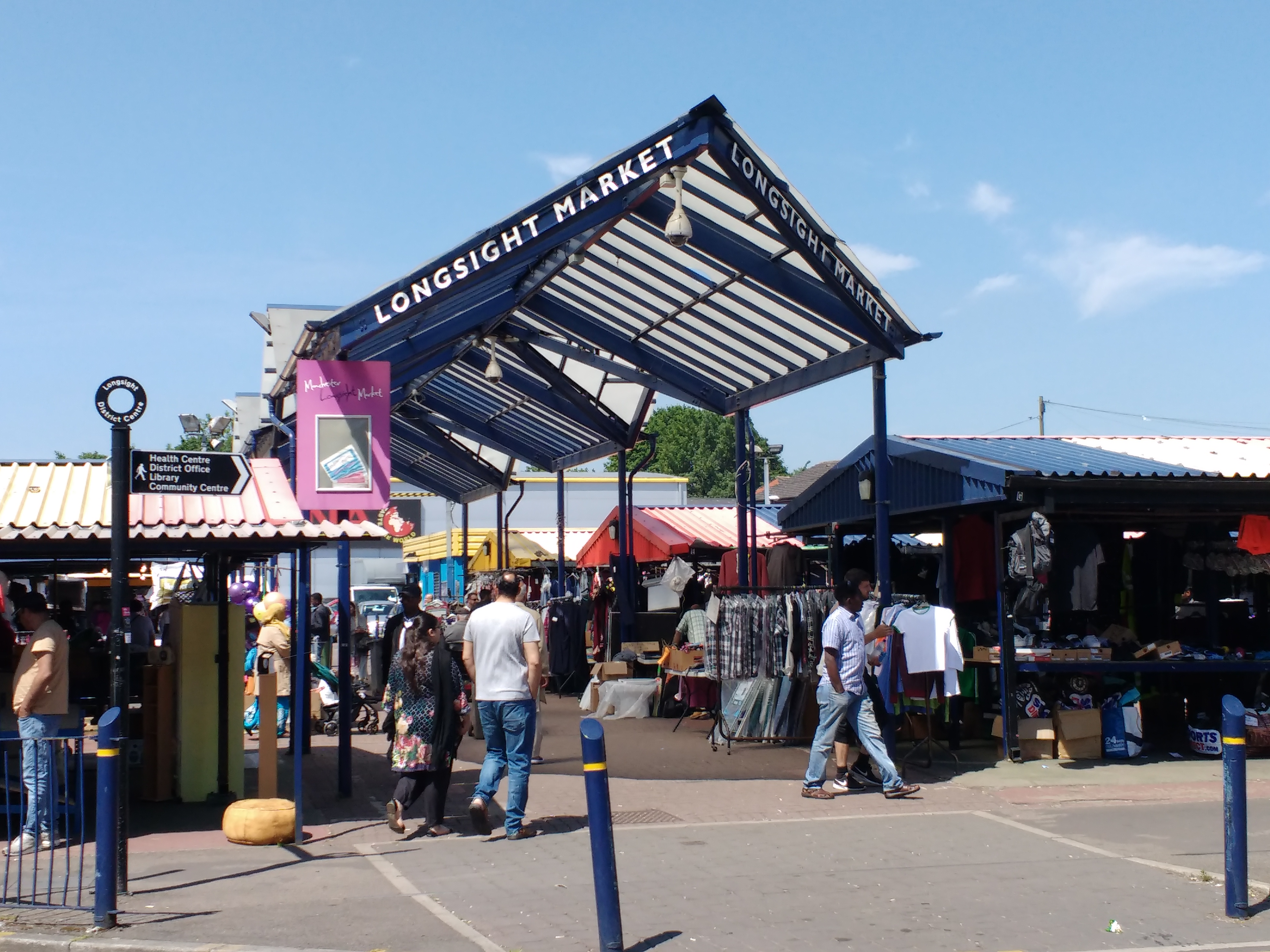
- Longsight Market

- Location within Greater Manchester
- Population: 15,429 (2011 Census)
- OS grid reference: SJ865965
- Metropolitan borough: City of Manchester
- Metropolitan county: Greater Manchester
- Region: North West
- Country: England
- Sovereign state: United Kingdom
- Post town: MANCHESTER
- Postcode district: M12, M13
- Dialling code: 0161
- Police: Greater Manchester
- Fire: Greater Manchester
- Ambulance: North West
- UK Parliament: Gorton and Denton
- Councillors: Asif Ranjha (Green); Suzanne Richards (Labour); Shahbaz Sarwar (Labour)

Longsight is an inner city area of Manchester, England, 3 miles (4.8 km) south of the city centre, bounded by Ardwick and West Gorton to the north and east; Levenshulme to the south; and Chorlton-on-Medlock, Victoria Park and Fallowfield to the west. Historically in Lancashire, it had a population of 15,429 at the 2011 census.

== History ==
For many years, Longsight has been plagued by gang related violence, similar to that of nearby Moss Side. Most of the violence came from tensions between two rival gangs which fought "turf wars" with each other since the 1990s, resulting in many shootings and several deaths. The Gooch Gang, from neighbouring Moss Side, were jailed in 2009, Consequently, gun crime in Greater Manchester as a whole has fallen dramatically, from a high of 120 gang-related shootings in 2006 to just 16 in 2011.

== Governance ==
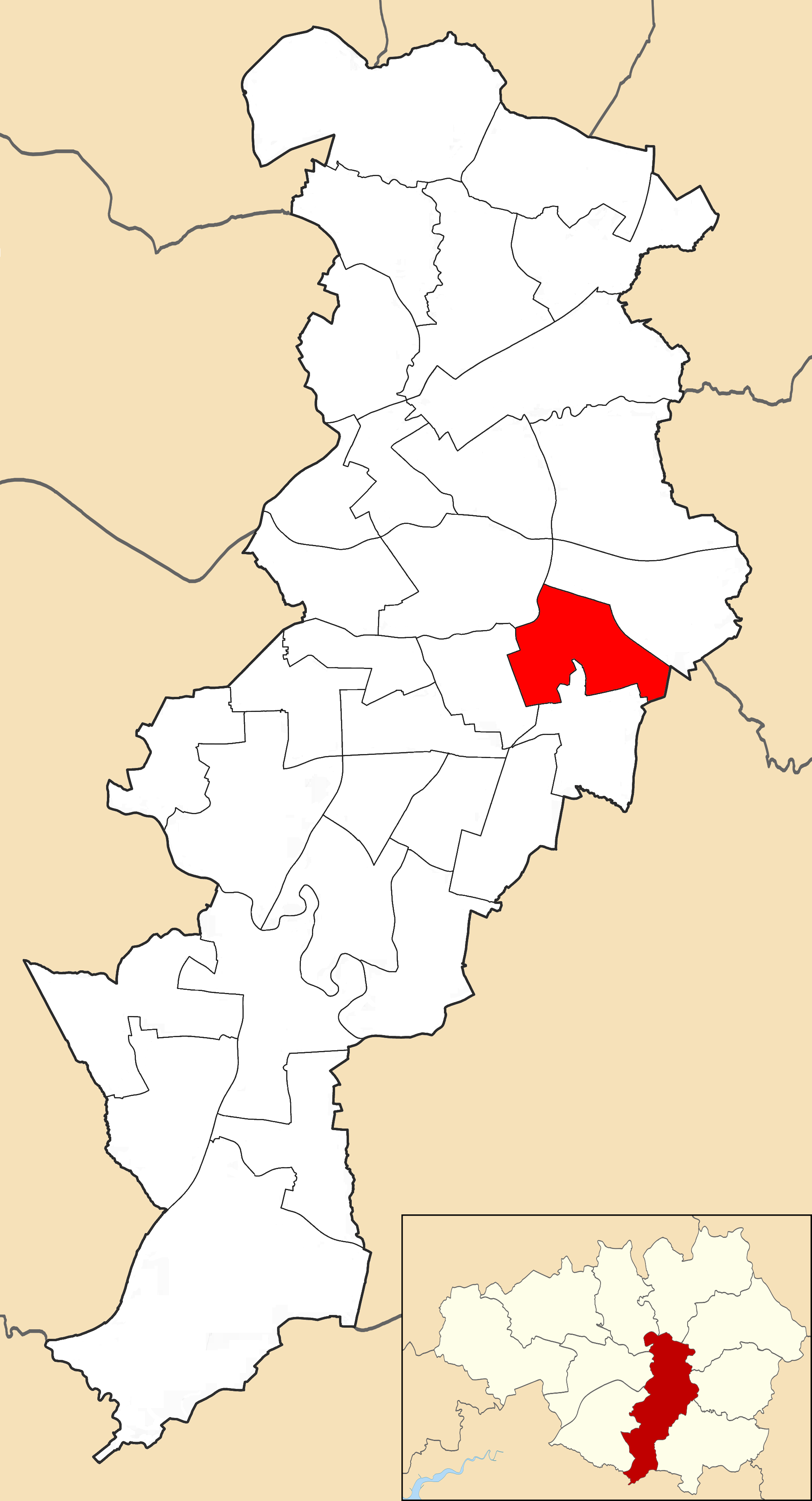
Longsight electoral ward within Manchester City Council.

Longsight has been in the parliamentary constituency of Gorton and Denton since boundary changes in 2024 and has been represented by Hannah Spencer of the Green Party since the 2026 Gorton and Denton by-election.

Councillors

The area is represented on Manchester City Council by three councillors: Suzanne Richards (Labour), Shahbaz Sarwar (Labour), and Asif Ranjha (Green).

Election	Councillor	Councillor	Councillor
2004	Mohammed Sajjad (Lib Dem)	Abid Chohan (Lib Dem)	Liaqat Ali (Lib Dem)
2006	Maryam Khan (Lab)	Abid Chohan (Lib Dem)	Liaqat Ali (Lib Dem)
2007	Maryam Khan (Lab)	Abid Chohan (Lib Dem)	Liaqat Ali (Lib Dem)
2008	Maryam Khan (Lab)	Abid Chohan (Lib Dem)	Luthfur Rahman (Lab)
2010	Suzanne Richards (Lab)	Abid Chohan (Lab)	Luthfur Rahman (Lab)
2011	Suzanne Richards (Lab)	Abid Chohan (Lab)	Luthfur Rahman (Lab)
2012	Suzanne Richards (Lab)	Abid Chohan (Lab)	Luthfur Rahman (Lab)
2014	Suzanne Richards (Lab)	Abid Chohan (Lab)	Luthfur Rahman (Lab)
2015	Suzanne Richards (Lab)	Abid Chohan (Lab)	Luthfur Rahman (Lab)
2016	Suzanne Richards (Lab)	Abid Chohan (Lab)	Luthfur Rahman (Lab)
2018	Suzanne Richards (Lab)	Luthfur Rahman (Lab)	Abid Chohan (Lab)
2019	Suzanne Richards (Lab)	Luthfur Rahman (Lab)	Abid Chohan (Lab)
2021	Suzanne Richards (Lab)	Luthfur Rahman (Lab)	Abid Chohan (Lab)
2022	Suzanne Richards (Lab)	Luthfur Rahman (Lab)	Abid Chohan (Lab)
2023	Suzanne Richards (Lab)	Luthfur Rahman (Lab)	Abid Chohan (Lab)
2024	Suzanne Richards (Lab)	Shahbaz Sarwar (Workers Party)	Abid Chohan (Lab)
2026	Suzanne Richards (Lab)	Shahbaz Sarwar (Lab)	Asif Ranjha (Grn)

indicates seat up for re-election. indicates councillor defected.

== Geography ==
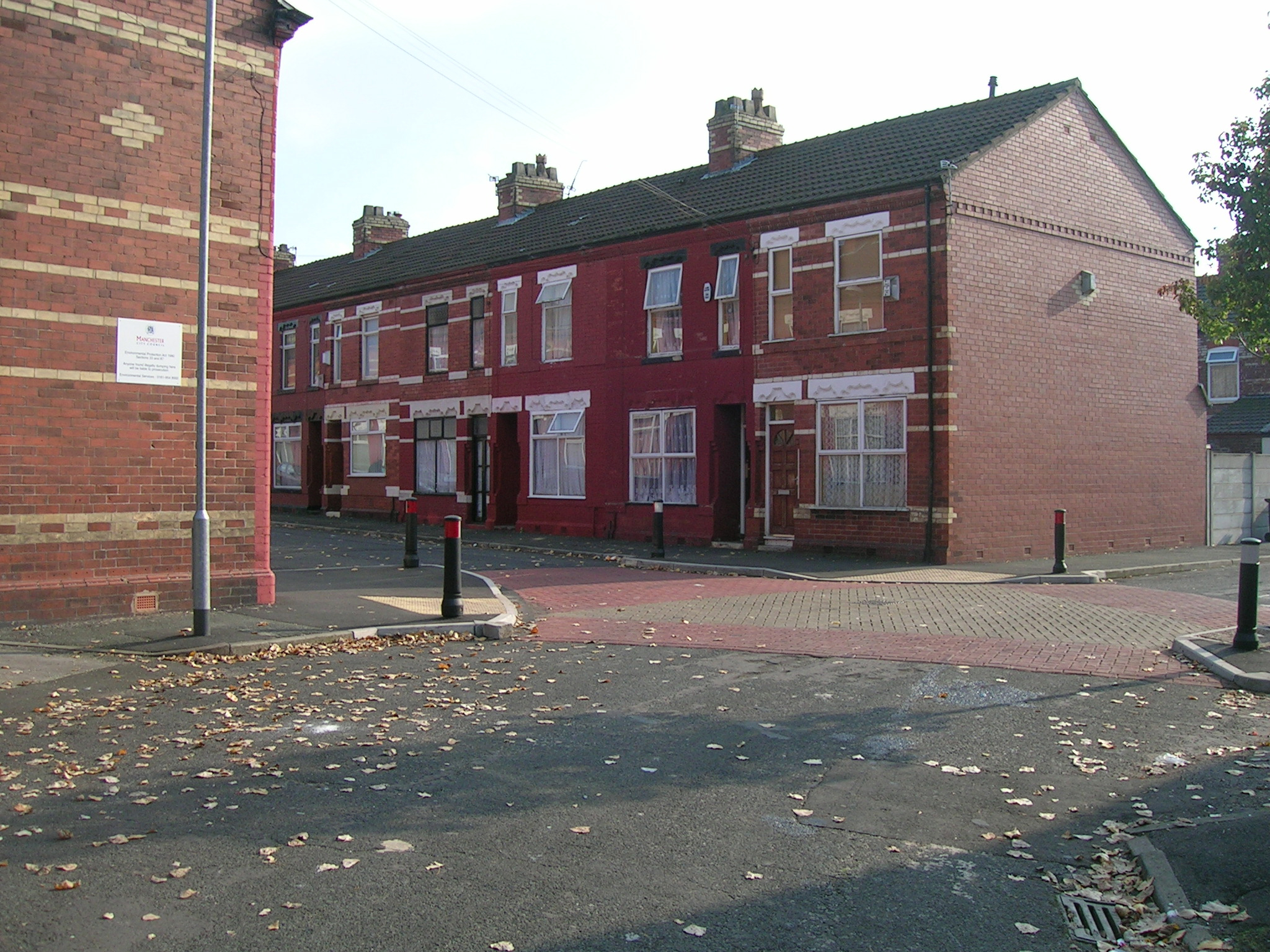
Much of the housing stock of Longsight consists of red-brick terraced houses

Previously known as Grindlow Marsh, it was incorporated into the City of Manchester in 1890. The district is bordered by Ardwick to the north, Rusholme to the west, Levenshulme to the south, and Gorton to the east, defined by Hyde Road, Grey Street, Stockport Road, Plymouth Grove, Daisy Bank Road, Pine Grove, Merwood Grove, Ash Grove, Longford Pl, Ayton Grove, Laindon Rd, Curzon Ave, Richmond Grove, Hathersage Road, Anson Road, Dickenson Road, Beresford Road, Old Hall Lane, Stockport Road, East Road, Pink Bank Lane, Nutsford Vale, Buckley Road and Mount Road. The old Roman road to Buxton (the A6, Stockport Road) bisects the area.

== Demography ==
Longsight has a very ethnically diverse population. According to the 2011 UK census, 72.9% of the population is from non-white ethnic groups, a 20% increase over the 2001 figure of 52.7%. This includes 55.3% who describe themselves as South Asian or South Asian British (including 35.7% Pakistani, 11.4% Bangladeshi); and 9.7% Black or Black British. The largest religious group is Muslim with 53.8% of the population, compared with the 2001 figure of 34.7% Muslim and 38.6% Christian. 7.0% of the population declined to state a religion, with 12.7% stating no religion. The census tended to underestimate immigrant communities, and it is likely that these groups in Longsight were underestimated and are now proportionately larger.

There are a number of places of Worship in the area, including a large Pakistani community centre, a Jain temple, the Russian Orthodox Church of the Pokrov, Saint Agnes' Church, Bethshan International Church, and the British Conference of The Church of God (Seventh Day).

=== Census table ===
Ethnic group	2011 Percentage	2001 Percentage
White; British	21.5%	39.9%
White; Irish	2.0%	4.3%
White; Gypsy or Irish Traveller	3.0%	6.0%
White; Other White	3.1%	3.1%
Mixed; White and Black Caribbean	1.5%	1.7%
Mixed; White and Black African	0.6%	0.7%
Mixed; White and Asian	1.3%	1.4%
Mixed; Other Mixed	0.8%	0.7%
South Asian; Indian	2.9%	2.7%
South Asian; Pakistani	35.7%	24.6%
South Asian; Bangladeshi	11.4%	7.2%
Asian; Chinese	1.9%	1.6%
Asian; Other Asian	3.4%	1.7%
Black; African	5.1%	3.7%
Black; Caribbean	2.7%	4.4%
Black; Other Black	1.9%	1.0%
Other; Arab	1.8%	n/a
Other; Any Other Ethnic Group	1.9%	1.3%

== Economy ==
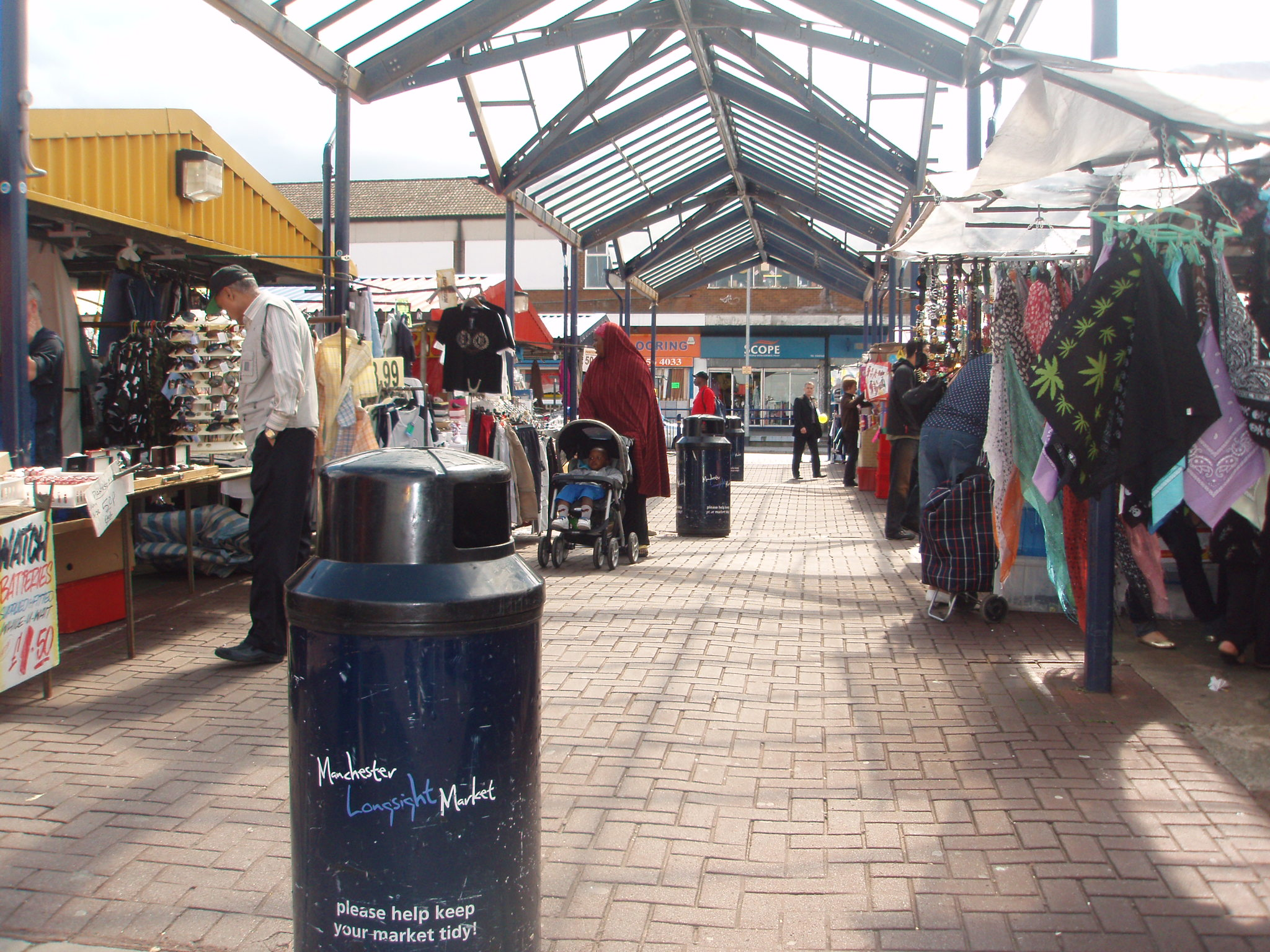
Longsight Market 2008

The main shopping centre is near the corner of Stockport Road and Dickenson Road, and contains a library and supermarkets as well as many smaller shops. Longsight Market, one of the busiest markets in England, is located on Dickenson Road. It can be easily spotted by its brightly coloured profiled roofs. The market hosts a general market every Tuesday, Wednesday, Friday and Saturday and a second-hand market every Tuesday and Thursday. There are a large number of authentic Pakistani takeaway food shops and restaurants and a very wide variety of fresh fruit and vegetables and other supplies to cater for the interests of the various immigrant communities in the area.

== Architecture and housing ==
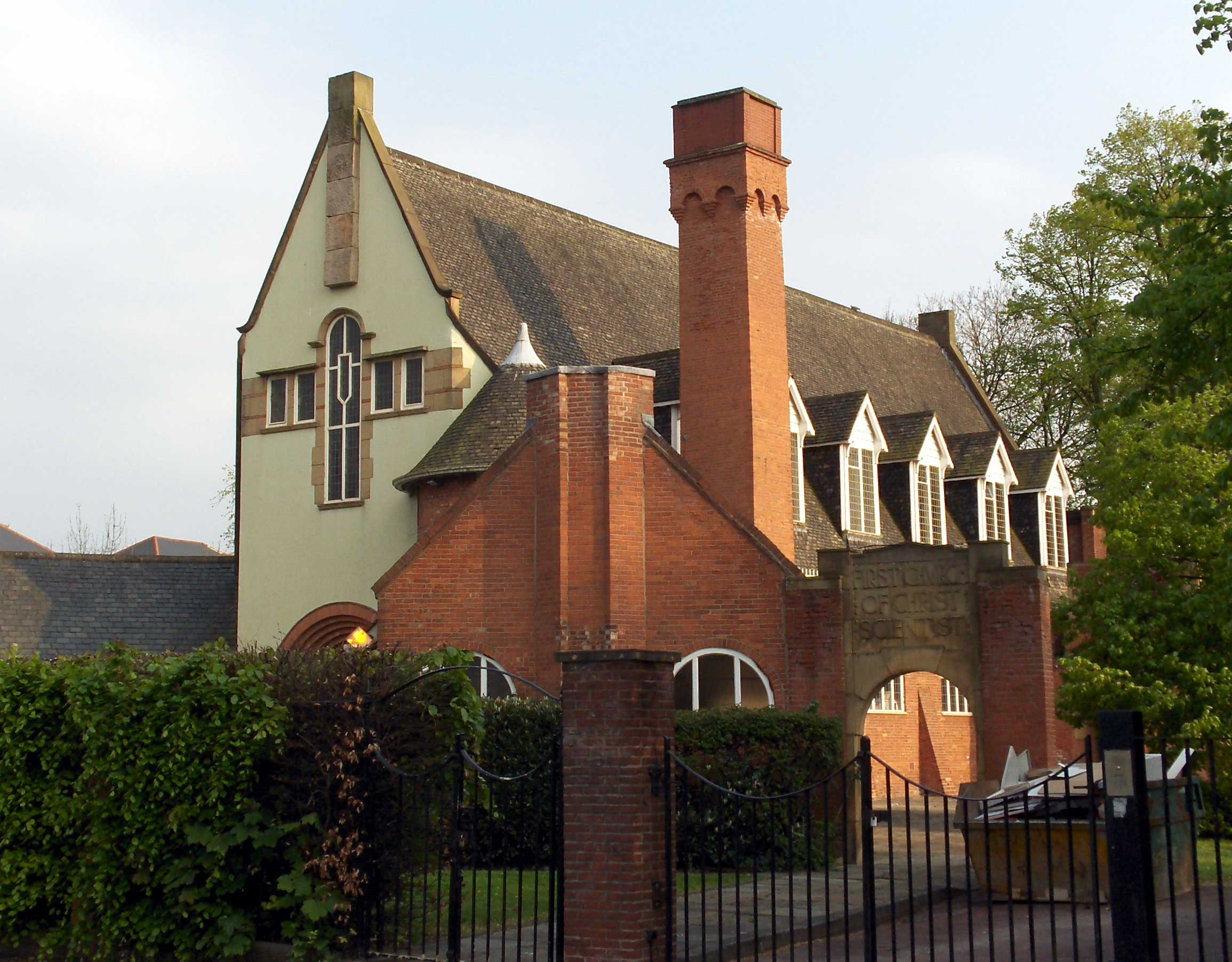
Former First Church of Christ, Scientist by Edgar Wood

Slade Hall

The area of Longsight contains many of the notable buildings of Victoria Park. Daisy Bank Road is a particularly good example, featuring Edgar Wood's Grade I listed First Church of Christ, Scientist and the Edwardian art nouveau Chadlington House, as well as the residences of Charles Hallé and Emmeline Pankhurst. Pankhurst's family house is also situated on the edge of Longsight at Plymouth Grove.

Larger Victorian period properties are predominantly clustered around the leafy western parts of Longsight, an area informally known as Westpoint. Many grand Victorian villas can also be found overlooking Crowcroft Park in the most southern part of Longsight.

Situated on Stockport Road near the main market of Longsight is Longsight Library. Run by Manchester City Council, it provides services such as borrowing books, adult education services and a child homework centre. Great measures have been taken to make the architectural view of new Longsight Library building aesthetically pleasing.

The Apollo Theatre, Longsight Market, Noman Newsagents, Crowcroft Park and new Longsight Library are the important places in the Longsight area.

== Transport ==
=== Railway ===
A spur of the West Coast Main Line passes through Longsight, which is located between Manchester Piccadilly and Stockport.

The area was once served by Longsight railway station, but this was closed in 1958. The nearest station is now at Levenshulme, which provides local Northern stopping services between Manchester, Stockport and locations in Cheshire. Ardwick station is also situated nearby, on the Hope Valley Line, but has a threadbare service.

Longsight Electric TMD and Longsight Diesel TMD service trains for Avanti West Coast, CrossCountry, Northern and TransPennine Express. A plan to house Eurostar trains at Manchester International Depot was abandoned in the 1990s.

The earliest railway works was set up in 1842 by the Manchester and Birmingham Railway (M&BR). Little is known about its early history, except that it produced fifteen single wheeler passenger engines to a design by Sharp, Stewart and Company. In 1846, the M&BR was amalgamated with the London and North Western Railway (LNWR) under John Ramsbottom. One 0-6-0 was produced in 1858, but then the works closed down as the LNWR transferred its operations to Crewe. The Longsight steam locomotive depot provided engines for express trains to London and elsewhere, and for local passenger trains.

=== Buses ===
Bus services in the area are provided by Stagecoach Manchester. The 192, according to Stagecoach, is the busiest bus route in Great Britain, with around 9 million passengers carried annually. The service runs every 5–10 minutes daily until the late hours.

The following routes serve Longsight:

- 53: Cheetham Hill – Gorton – Rusholme – Old Trafford – Salford Quays – Pendleton
- 150: Gorton – Levenshulme – Chorlton-cum-Hardy – Stretford – The Trafford Centre
- 191: Manchester (Albert Sq.)– Longsight – Levenshulme – Stockport – Stepping Hill Hospital – Hazel Grove
- 192: Manchester (Piccadilly) – Longsight – Levenshulme – Stockport – Stepping Hill Hospital – Hazel Grove
- 197: Manchester (Albert Sq.) - Longsight – Levenshulme – Green End – Stockport

=== Roads ===
The A6, which connects Carlisle with Luton, passes through Longsight; it connects the suburb with Stockport and Manchester city centre.

== Notable residents ==
- Aziz Ibrahim, former guitarist for The Stone Roses.
- Davy Jones, member of 1960s pop group The Monkees born 1945.
- Charles Hallé lived at 3 Addison Terrace, on the north side of Daisy Bank Road in Victoria Park, in 1848; he was founder of the Hallé Orchestra.
- Artist Ford Madox Brown lived at the same address as Hallé from 1883 to 1887.
- Edwin Chadwick, social reformer and liberal politician, was born in Longsight. He was later partially responsible for the 1848 Public Health Act and then the succeeding 1875 Public Health Act. A Wetherspoons pub in the area was named the Sir Edwin Chadwick, but closed within three years after custom failed to live up to expectations.
- Jason Garrity, speedway rider.
- John Thaw, television, stage and cinema actor, was born in Longsight in 1942.
- Ethel 'Sunny' Lowry, the first British woman to swim the English Channel, was born in Longsight in 1911.
- Former Manchester United footballers Danny Welbeck and Wes Brown are both from the area.
- Harry Potter actress Afshan Azad was born in Longsight.
- Keith Bennett, one of the Moors murders victims, was from Longsight. He was 12 years old when he disappeared on his way from his house to that of his grandmother on 16 June 1964. His disappearance was reported to police the following morning but, in spite of endless police searches, he was not found. 22 years later, in November 1986, Moors murderers Ian Brady (who had also lived in Longsight when he was younger) and Myra Hindley revealed that he was one of their victims, just as police had first suspected after arresting them for three other murders in October 1965. Despite numerous searches for his body on Saddleworth Moor, it has yet to be found. His mother Winnie Johnson continued to live locally until her death in August 2012; she made constant calls in the media for help to locate her son's body.
- Faisal Islam, of BBC News, grew up in Longsight and attended the local private school.
- Mohammed Amin, was raised on a Turnbull Road terraced house.
- Oasis members Liam and Noel Gallagher were born in Longsight, but later moved to Burnage.
- Menelik Watson, former NFL offensive tackle with the Oakland Raiders and the Denver Broncos

== Cultural references ==
Longsight was immortalised in song by local singer Ian Brown formerly of the Stone Roses on his album Solarized. The song was titled "Longsight M13" reflecting the postcode of the area, which begins with M13. Graffiti appeared locally saying 'Stone Roses RIP' when the band split up, and 'Free Ian Brown' when he was jailed. The song was written with Brown's former bandmate, guitarist Aziz Ibrahim, who still lives in Longsight. Brown also mentions the area in the Stone Roses song "Daybreak" which contains the line "From Atlanta, Georgia, to Longsight, Manchester".

== See also ==
- Listed buildings in Manchester-M13
