= Grove House, Manchester =

Listed building in Manchester, England

Grove House
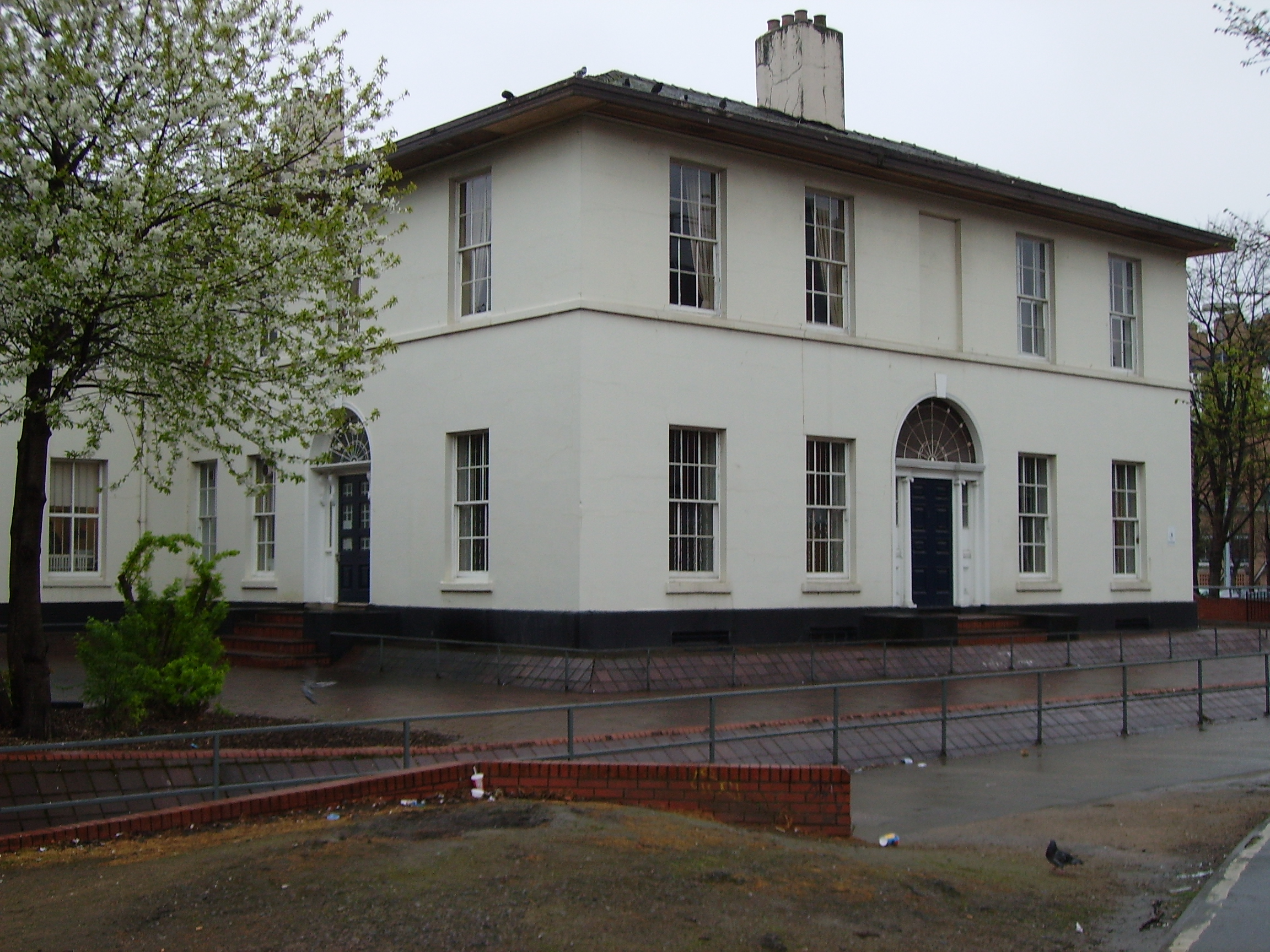
- Grove House, 316–324 Oxford Road

- Location within Greater Manchester

General information
- Status: Converted to administrative use
- Location: Oxford Road, Chorlton-on-Medlock, Manchester, England
- Coordinates: 53.4623°N 2.2302°W
- Year built: Early 19th century

Technical details
- Floor count: 2

Design and construction
- Designations

Listed Building – Grade II*
- Official name: Student Health Centre, University of Manchester
- Designated: 18 December 1963
- Reference no.: 1246450

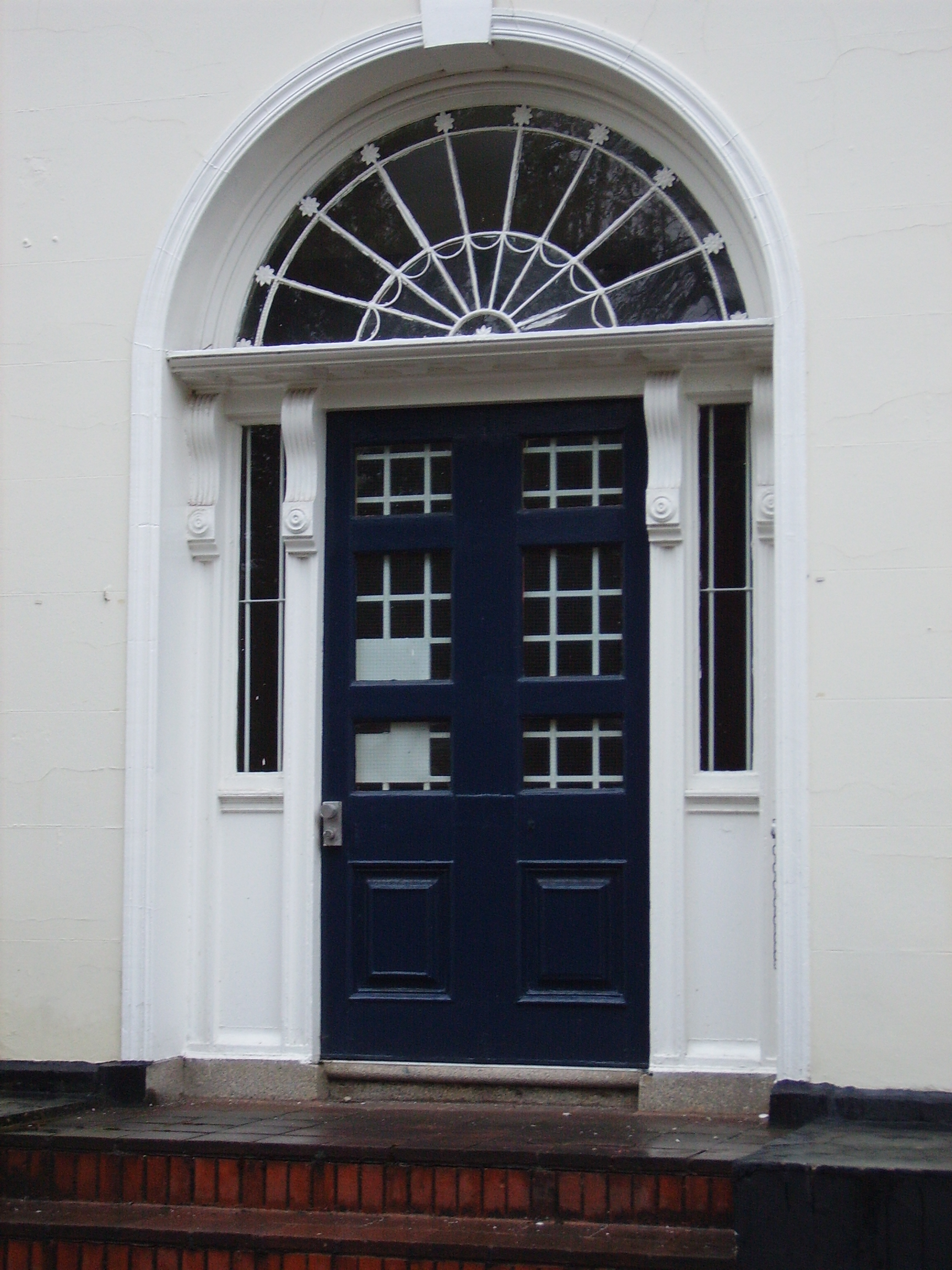
Doorcase with fanlight

Grove House (officially listed as Student Health Centre, University of Manchester) is a Grade II* listed early Victorian building on Oxford Road in Chorlton-on-Medlock, an inner-city area of Manchester, England. Built in the early 19th century as three houses later combined into one, it became part of Edmund Potter's estate and featured in 1880s debates about creating a public park. The property was purchased in 1887 for the Whitworth Trust, which redesigned the grounds and adapted Grove House for a growing art collection, with further gallery additions made by the Whitworth Institute in the 1890s. From about 1952 it was occupied by the Victoria University of Manchester and used for various university purposes, including as a student health centre, and it now serves as the main administrative building for the University of Manchester's Whitworth Park halls of residence.

== History ==
The building was constructed in the early 19th century, according to its official listing, and began as a block of three houses that were later combined into a single property. (Note: Another source states it was built in 1838–40.)

After a series of owners, it subsequently formed part of Edmund Potter's 20-acre (8.1 ha) estate, stood within maintained gardens, and became central to debates in the 1880s about whether the estate should be acquired for a public park rather than sold for housebuilding. After Potter's death, the estate remained unsold and public pressure for its purchase continued. The situation changed in 1887 when Joseph Whitworth's legatees bought the land for the Whitworth Trust, the body responsible for administering Whitworth's estate.

They cleared and replanned the grounds and adapted Grove House to display a growing art collection. The Whitworth Institute, created by the Trust and supported by new donations after its incorporation, then sought improved accommodation for this expanding collection. In 1891 it organised a competition to remodel Grove House as an art gallery, awarding the commission to J. W. Beaumont, a Manchester architect already involved in projects for the legatees. The rear of the building was demolished to allow for new galleries built between 1892 and 1898.

Grove House was first occupied by the Victoria University of Manchester in c. 1952 and has had various uses since, including serving as a student health centre.

On 18 December 1963, the building was designated a Grade II* listed structure.

It was later refurbished internally to provide administrative and office space on the ground and first floors for the university campus, though the dates of these works have not been made public. The building now functions as the main administrative centre and shared facilities building for the University of Manchester's Whitworth Park halls of residence.

== Architecture ==
The building has scored render walls and a hipped slate roof. It has a square main block with small wings at the back, two storeys and a symmetrical front of five windows, with a plinth, a band at first‑floor level and deep eaves. The centre features a broad arched doorway with a detailed surround, divided doors, side panels and a fanlight with fine glazing bars. Each floor has four sash windows, with a blind opening above the entrance. The side elevations have four windows arranged in a similar manner, with simpler doorways and smaller sash windows.

Pevsner described it as "a large detached house set back from the street."

== See also ==
- Grade II* listed buildings in Greater Manchester
- Listed buildings in Manchester-M13

== Bibliography ==
- Charlton, H. B. (1952). Portrait of a University, 1851–1951. Manchester: Manchester University Press. OCLC 7455878.
- Hartwell, Clare; Hyde, Matthew; Pevsner, Nikolaus (2004). Lancashire: Manchester and the South East. The Buildings of England. New Haven, US and London: Yale University Press. ISBN 978-0-300-10583-4.
