= Plymouth Grove Hotel =

Listed former hotel-pub in Manchester, England

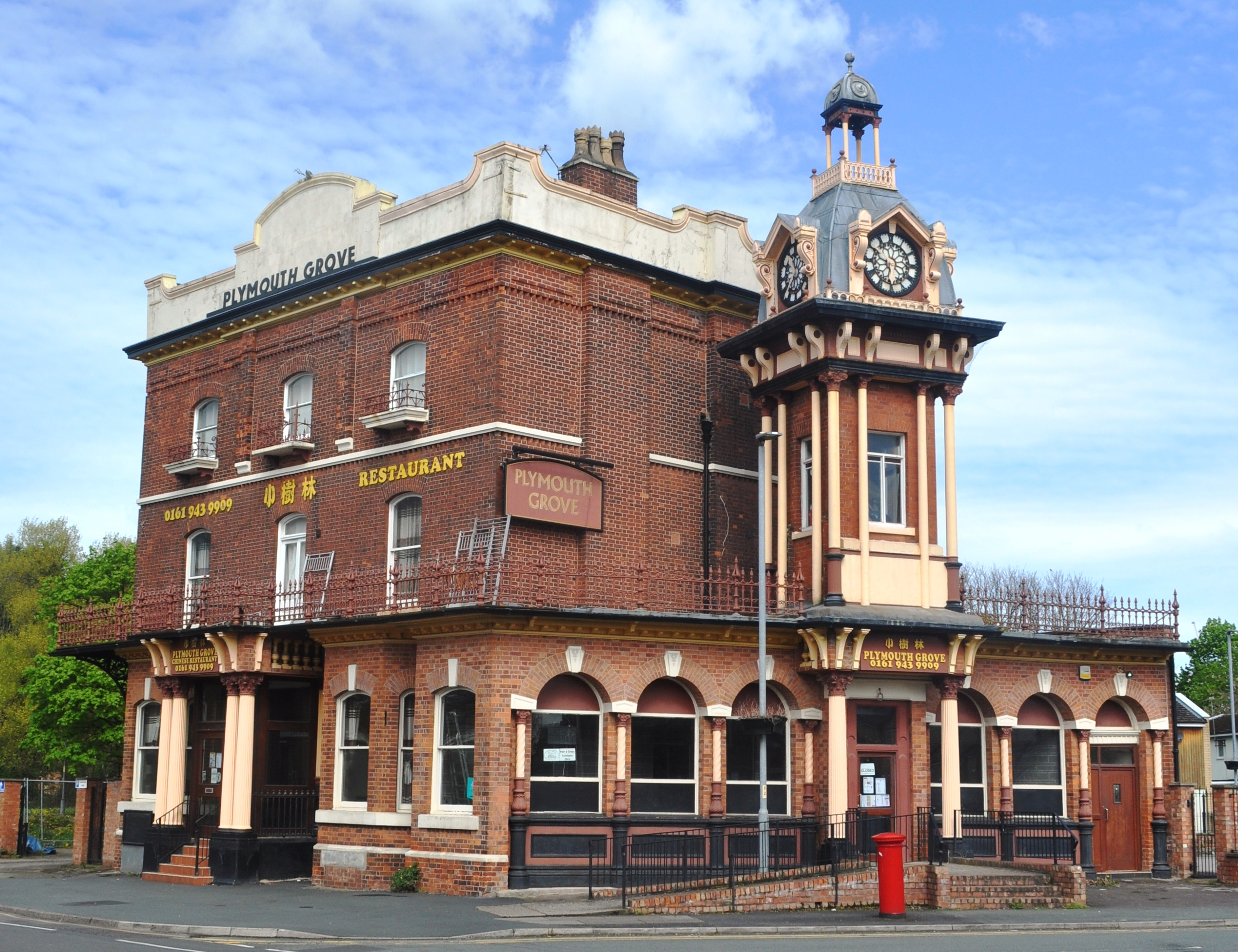
- The building in 2024
- Alternative names: Plymouth Grove Chinese Restaurant

General information
- Status: Converted to restaurant use
- Type: Hotel-pub (1873–2003); Vacant (2003–2016); Restaurant (2016–present)
- Location: 65 Plymouth Grove, Chorlton-on-Medlock, Manchester, England
- Coordinates: 53.4645°N 2.2232°W
- Year built: 1873; 153 years ago
- Opening: 2016 (as a restaurant)
- Renovated: 1887 (extended) c. 2013–2016 (converted)
- Closed: 2003 (as a pub)

Design and construction
- Designations

Listed Building – Grade II
- Official name: Plymouth Grove Hotel
- Designated: 3 October 1974
- Reference no.: 1271094

The Plymouth Grove Hotel is a Grade II listed former hotel and public house on Plymouth Grove in Chorlton-on-Medlock, an inner city area of Manchester, England. Built in the early 1870s and later incorporated into the Boddingtons Brewery estate, it closed in 2003 and remained derelict for more than a decade before reopening as a restaurant in 2016.

== History ==
According to one source, the Plymouth Grove Hotel was built in 1871 for Michael Cummins. However, its official listing gives a construction date of 1873, with extension work undertaken in 1887 for Eliza Jane Cummins. The pub later became part of the Boddingtons Brewery estate, although the date at which it entered the tied estate is not recorded in the available sources.

The building is shown on 1890s and 1920s Ordnance Survey maps as a hotel and a public house, respectively.

Imagery from the 1950s shows that the building was then surrounded by housing. On 3 October 1974, the pub was designated a Grade II listed building.

The building was closed and vacant from 2003, and although Manchester City Council granted planning permission in 2005 for the conversion of the property into ten flats, the scheme was never implemented. The building subsequently fell into disrepair, was boarded up, and became a target for vandalism. In August 2011, Greater Manchester Police raided the derelict premises and discovered a cannabis‑growing operation inside.

The property changed ownership in March 2012, and revised proposals submitted in late 2013 set out plans for a 128-seat restaurant on the ground and first floors, with storage and toilets in the basement and two apartments on the upper floors. The building reopened in 2016 as a Chinese restaurant following restoration.

== Architecture ==
The building is constructed of red brick with stone detailing, and its roofline is hidden from view. It has a square layout with an angled porch and clock tower on the east side. It rises three storeys above a basement and has three front windows. A broad first‑floor balcony wraps around the front and continues onto the porch, with a band marking the second‑floor window line and a shaped parapet carrying the name "PLYMOUTH GROVE." The main entrance sits beneath the projecting centre of the balcony, supported by paired columns, and is flanked by angled bay windows. All windows have shallow arched heads; those on the ground floor have stone surrounds with keystones, and those on the top floor are shorter and fitted with small railings. The balcony is cantilevered and edged with cast‑iron railings.

The porch forms a wide diagonal projection on the right‑hand side, with seven bays including a central doorway framed by columns and arched windows on either side. Above this is a tall, narrow tower with slender columns, decorative capitals, a large bracketed cornice, and a domed top with clock faces and a small ornate cupola.

== See also ==
- Listed buildings in Manchester-M13
- Listed pubs in Manchester
