= Greater Manchester Council for Voluntary Organisation =

Defunct regional infrastructure organisation in Greater Manchester

The Greater Manchester Centre for Voluntary Organisation (GMCVO), previously known as the Greater Manchester Council for Voluntary Service (GMCVS), was a regional infrastructure organisation supporting the voluntary, community and social enterprise (VCSE) sector across Greater Manchester, United Kingdom. Operating from 1975 until 2025, GMCVO provided advocacy, funding support, partnership coordination and research on behalf of local civil society groups. The organisation became a prominent advocate for voluntary sector interests, particularly during the 1980s when public funding cuts threatened many civic organisations.

== GMCVS (1975–1995) ==
Many Councils for Voluntary Service (CVSs) were established in England following local government reorganisation in 1974. In 1975 the Greater Manchester Council for Voluntary Service (GMCVS) was established to operate across the ten districts of Greater Manchester (Bolton, Bury, Manchester, Oldham, Rochdale, Salford, Stockport, Tameside, Trafford and Wigan). The funding for GMCVS came through Greater Manchester Council. The first chief officer (General Secretary) was appointed in January 1975 and the organisation was registered as a charity (504542) and as a non-profit company (01223344) in August / September 1975. After the General Secretary, one of the first jobs to be advertised was Information Officer.

The original functions of the organisation were:

- to extend co-operation between voluntary organisations and public bodies (liaison),
- to ensure the views of the voluntary sector were recognised and taken account of by statutory authorities and others (representation),
- to provide services to district CVSs and voluntary organisations so they were more effective in what they did (services), and
- to initiate projects in response to needs and foster new organisations to meet those needs (development).

The first office was at Elliot House, 3 Jacksons Row, Manchester M2 5WD; then in the late 1970s nearby at Croxley House, Lloyd Street, Manchester M2 5ND, and finally moving in 1982 to the St Thomas Centre, Ardwick Green North, Manchester M12 6FZ, which is a Georgian Grade II listed former church built in 1741. GMCVS shared this repurposed church building with the Greater Manchester Youth Association (GMYA) on lease from Greater Manchester Council, which had bought the disused church for £10,000 in 1979 and paid £500,000 for its renovation, the works completed in May 1983.

=== Abolition of principal funder, Greater Manchester Council ===
In 1986 the Thatcher government abolished the Greater London Council (GLC) and the six metropolitan county councils in England. Henry West, the GMCVS General Secretary, led a campaign to protect the funding of voluntary organisations in the major cities outside of London, including a letter to Kenneth Baker MP, the Secretary of State for the Environment dated 4 March 1986, which was replied to on 7 April 1986, both letters held in the House of Commons Library. This campaign led to a new Section 48 with grant-making powers for successor bodies being added to the Act of Parliament.

The GMCVS Annual Report was quoted in the press as saying that a result of this was that funding for voluntary organisations was "a mess", but also that voluntary organisations in the Greater Manchester county "had coped with abolition ... better than any other area of the country. [... because] The grants committee of the new Association of Greater Manchester Authorities [will continue to fund] voluntary organisations."

In the 1980s and 1990s GMCVO staff supported significant sector initiatives, including backing the Greater Manchester Coalition of Disabled People through its community development activities.

By 1992 the AGMA Grants Committee was proposing to cut its funding for GMCVS from £204,000 to £98,000 (52% less), caused by a 10% cut overall to the committee's £3-million budget. However, arts organisations funded by the committee would receive additional funds to allow for inflation. The General Secretary, Judy Robinson, was quoted in the press saying, "These cuts are utterly indefensible and reflect a wholly unacceptable set of principles, values and social priorities". A previous, smaller cut in 1991 had led to two redundancies and service reductions. Following this campaign the cut was reduced to £54,000 (26% less). A press quote was, "We are pleased ... [but we] won't able to carry out two of our long term projects involving the elderly and health care."

Heads of Staff
Name	Title	From	To
Henry West	General Secretary	1975	1990
Judy Robinson	General Secretary (Deputy GS from 1986)	1991	2002
Alex Whinnom	Director	2003	2021
John Hannen	CEO	2021	2024

The organisation was briefly renamed as Centre for Voluntary Organisation between 1995 and 1997.

== GMCVO (1997–2025) ==
Renamed as GMCVO in 1997, the organisation's role started to broaden by supporting social enterprises and getting more involved in local projects, including elderly people in Salford using stage drama for oral histories, youth employment placements in inner Salford and Manchester, reducing the social isolation of elderly people in Bolton, a £2.25 million social investment fund to provide loans of £50k to £250k to voluntary, community and social enterprises (VCSE) organisations struggling with the COVID-19 pandemic, Greater Manchester's Hidden Talent, and funding a co-working space for creativity in Leigh.

GMCVO reportedly faced further funding cuts in 2013.

=== GMCVO Trading Ltd ===
In November 2014 the GMCVO Trading Ltd company was established. It was a Single Member Private Company where the sole member was GMCVO, being the only organisation which could receive donations and assets. In the 2017 financial year it reported a net profit of £19,487. In June 2025 an application was made to close the company, with its most recent balance sheet showing a net debt liability of £16,541.

=== Social investment funds ===
On 10 July 2017 the Big Society Capital Ltd (connected to the Big Lottery Growth Fund) registered a charge (securing an obligation to repay when due against assets) at Companies House relating to Access to Growth GM Ltd, and on 20 October 2023 the Greater Manchester Combined Authority registered a charge at Companies House relating to Access to Emergency Investment GM Ltd.

== Closure ==
The closure of GMCVO by its four remaining trustees in November 2024 (being put into administration, to be managed by Opus Restructuring LLP) was a significant and unexpected event for the VCSE (voluntary, community and social enterprise) sector in Greater Manchester. Four other trustees had resigned in 2024 according to Companies House. Press reporting by The Mill, citing six former staff, described its closure as an 'abrupt collapse'.

The most recent return to the Charity Commission stated it had 34 employees and two volunteers. The organisation had been a hub for innovation, particularly in social enterprises, running programmes like the Growth Fund, Enterprising Communities Fund, and Local Access Programme. In November 2024 these were transferred to Key Fund Investments, based in Sheffield, following the appointment of administrators.

In June 2025 the Administrators submitted a report to Companies House, 33 pages, which states that five employees (including the building's facility management staff) were transferred to other service providers, the rest being made redundant in phases from November 2024 to March 2025. The St Thomas Centre building lease was taken on by Manchester Community Central (Macc) and continues to operate as a meeting and event venue for charities and community projects.
