= Ardwick Green =

Public park in Manchester, England

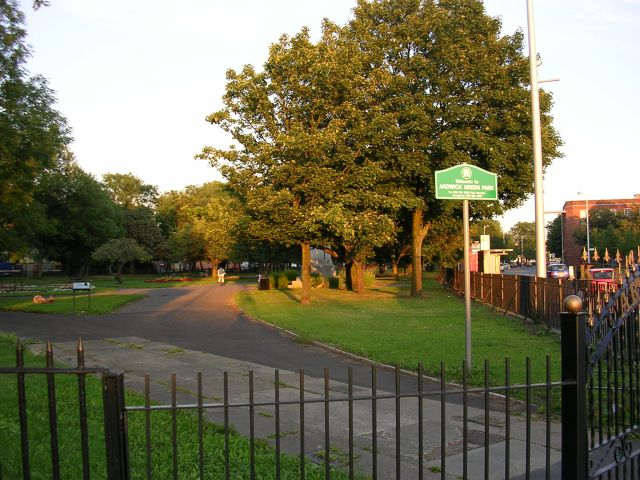
- Ardwick Green Park
- Interactive map of Ardwick Green
- Type: Public park
- Location: Ardwick
- Nearest city: Manchester
- Coordinates: 53.4714°N 2.2243°W
- Created: 1867
- Operator: Manchester City Council
- Open: Dawn to dusk

Listed Building – Grade II
- Official name: Railings of Ardwick Green
- Designated: 3 October 1974
- Reference no.: 1207603

Ardwick Green is a public space in Ardwick, Manchester, England. It began as a private park for the residents of houses surrounding it before Manchester acquired it in 1867 and turned it into a public park with an ornamental pond and a bandstand.

It contains a cenotaph commemorating the dead of the Eighth Ardwicks, a former unit of the Territorial Army belonging to the Manchester Regiment. The old drill hall at one end of the park is still used by volunteer soldiers. The other end of the park contains a large boulder, a glacial erratic.

The business premises of Thomas Brown, surveyor and Resident Engineer for the construction of the Peak Forest Canal, were in Manchester and by 1841 he was living in Allerton Place at 16 Ardwick Green. He died here on the 30 January 1850, aged 78 years. Allerton Place was demolished and by 1915 a tyre works had been built on the site.

The early 19th-century cast iron railings on the north and west sides of Ardwick Green were Grade II listed on 3 October 1974.

Many of the grand buildings have been demolished, including the Ardwick Empire Music Hall (later Manchester Hippodrome) at the eastern end.

== Church of St Thomas ==
The Church of St Thomas, on the north side of Ardwick Green, was consecrated as a chapel of ease in 1741. It was rebuilt and extended in the course of the late eighteenth century, and acquired a campanile tower in the 1830s. After closure it was, from 1982 to 2024, the headquarters of the Greater Manchester Council for Voluntary Organisation. As of 2025, the building, now known as The St Thomas Centre, is managed by Manchester Community Central (Macc).
