= Listed buildings in Manchester-M12 =

Manchester is a city in Northwest England. The M12 postcode area is to the east of the centre of the city and includes the district of Ardwick. This postcode area contains 16 listed buildings that are recorded in the National Heritage List for England. Of these, two are listed at Grade II*, the middle of the three grades, and the others are at Grade II, the lowest grade. Most of the listed buildings are houses. The other listed buildings include a former charity hospital with associated structures including two monuments, two churches, a drill hall, a shop, and a theatre.

== Key ==
Grade	Criteria
II*	Particularly important buildings of more than special interest
II	Buildings of national importance and special interest

== Buildings ==
Name and location	Photograph	Date	Notes	Grade
Former Church of St Thomas; 53.47242°N 2.22463°W		1741	The former church was widened in 1777, extended in 1831, and the tower was added in 1836. It is in red brick with some sandstone dressings, and is in Georgian style. The church has rusticated quoins, a moulded cornice, and a brick parapet with stone coping. At the west end is a tower in the style of an Italian campanile, with a round-headed west doorway, clock faces, an open arcaded belfry, a cornice, and a pyramidal roof with a weathervane. Along the sides of the church are two tiers of round-headed windows.	II
21 and 23 Manor Street; 53.47276°N 2.22557°W	—	c. 1805–06	A pair of red brick houses in a terrace with some sandstone dressings and a slate roof. They have two storeys over a basement, a double-depth plan, and each house has a symmetrical front of three bays. Three steps lead up to central round-headed doorways that have recessed Tuscan doorcases and fanlights. The windows have flat-arched heads with altered glazing.	II
25 Manor Street; 53.47266°N 2.22573°W	—	c. 1805–06	A house in a terrace in red brick with some sandstone dressings and a slate roof. It has two storeys over a basement, a double-depth plan, three bays, and a rear extension. Three steps lead up to a central round-headed doorway with a recessed Tuscan doorcase and a fanlight, and to the right is an elliptical-headed wagon entrance. The windows are sashes with flat heads.	II
31 Ardwick Green North; 53.47235°N 2.22519°W		Early 19th century	A red brick house with some sandstone dressings, dentilled stone eaves, and a slate roof. There are two storeys over a basement, a double-depth plan, and a symmetrical front of five bays. Flights of steps from the sides lead up to the central doorway that has an architrave and a pediment. The windows are sashes with flat-arched heads, the window above the door having an architrave, a bracketed sill, and a dentilled cornice.	II
Milford House; 53.47243°N 2.22564°W	—	Early 19th century	A house in red brick on a stone plinth, with sandstone dressings, a wooden modillioned eaves cornice, and a hipped slate roof. There are three storeys and a basement, a double-depth plan, three bays, and a rear extension. In the left bay steps lead up to a segmental-headed doorway with engaged Ionic columns, an entablature and a fanlight. The windows are sashes.	II
27 Manor Street; 53.47252°N 2.22581°W		c. 1830	A house at the end of a terrace in red brick on a stone plinth, with some sandstone dressings, a wooden modillion eaves cornice, and a hipped slate roof. There are three storeys and a basement, a double-depth plan, and a symmetrical front of three bays, with two bays on the right return. Steps lead up to a central round-arched doorway with a recessed Tuscan doorcase with a fanlight. The windows are sashes with flat heads, and on the first floor is an inscribed stone plaque.	II
2 and 4 Palfrey Place; 53.47143°N 2.22030°W		Early to mid-19th century	A pair of houses in stuccoed brick with a sill band, corner pilasters, a plain frieze, and a slate roof. They have three storeys with cellars, a double-depth plan, and each house has three bays and rear extensions. The ground floor is rusticated and in the right bay is a doorway approached by steps that has a porch with Doric columns and pilasters, an entablature and cornice, and a doorway with a fanlight. The windows on the upper two floors have architraves, and all have altered glazing.	II
Fenton House; 53.47103°N 2.22147°W		c. 1840	The house is in rendered brick with a coped parapet and a slate roof. It has a double-depth plan, two storeys and a basement, and a front of five bays with a lower two-bay wing to the left. Steps lead up to a central doorway with an ironwork canopy, and to the right is a segmental bow window. The windows are sashes.	II
Former Nicholls Hospital; 53.46929°N 2.21646°W		1879–80	Originally a charity school, later used for other purposes, it was designed by Thomas Worthington in Gothic style. It is in red brick with sandstone dressings and a slate roof. There are two storeys with a basement and attic, a symmetrical front of eleven bays with a central tower, and extensions to the rear. The tower has a machicolated parapet with corner tourelles, and a steeply pitched saddleback roof with ridge cresting. At its base is a doorway with a moulded surround and oriel windows above. There are tourelles on the corners of the building, and each bay contains cross-windows with gabled half-dormers in the attic.	II*
Walls, gates and gate piers, Nicholls Hospital; 53.46911°N 2.21647°W	—	1879–80	The walls and gate piers are in sandstone, and the gates are in cast iron. There are dwarf walls along the front, and four square gate piers with moulded plinths, brattished cornices, and pyramidal caps with finials.	II
Anglican Church of St Benedict; 53.46940°N 2.20400°W		1880	The church was designed by J. S. Crowther in Early English style, and incorporated a clergy house and a Sunday school. It is in red brick with dressings in orange brick, stone tracery, and a slate roof. The church consists of a nave with a clerestory, a south aisle, a chancel with transepts, and a northwest steeple. To the north is a two-storey clergy house. The steeple has a tower with buttresses, three stages above the eaves, a bell stage with tourelle pinnacles, a machicolated pierced parapet and a steep pyramidal roof. At the west end are buttresses, an entrance with two doorways and a moulded pointed arch, above which is a blank arcade with shafts, and a rose window.	II*
Benjamin Nicholls Memorial; 53.46919°N 2.21650°W	—	c. 1880	The memorial commemorates the founder of the Nicholls Hospital, and is sited near its entrance. It is in polished grey granite with a square plan. There is a base of two chamfered steps, a tapered pedestal with triangular-headed panels, and on the top are pediments, acroteria and a draped urn. On the east side is an inscribed epitaph.	II
Drill Hall; 53.47231°N 2.22710°W		1886	The entrance block of the drill hall is in sandstone with bands, a corbel table, and an embattled parapet. It has three storeys, three wide bays, and a four-storey tower on the left. In the central bay is a segmental-arched entrance, above which is a three-light window under another segmental arch, slit windows and a lettered panel. This is flanked by corbelled tourelles rising to form chimneys. On the ground floor are arcades of round-headed windows, on the middle floor are arched windows with an oriel window in the right bay, and on the top floor are slit windows. The tower is square, and contains slit windows and one small oriel window.	II
John Nicholls Memorial; 53.46900°N 2.21650°W		1904	The memorial is in the grounds of the Nicholls Hospital. It is in polished grey granite, and consists of an obelisk on a square pedestal on a base of three square steps. On the front is an inscription.	II
Former Beswick Cooperative Society building 53.45635°N 2.19303°W		1912	The building is in red brick with dressings of green and buff glazed terracotta, and has a red tiled roof with ridge tiles. It is in Edwardian Baroque style, with two storeys and an attic, and eleven bays. In the centre is a recessed porch with Ionic columns and a segmental pediment, above which is a canted bay window with a parapet and a segmental pediment. Flanking the centre are shop fronts between which are Ionic pilasters. Between the bays on the upper floor are Ionic semi-columns, above which is a cornice, a frieze with swags, a parapet with balustrades, and triangular dormers. At the left end is a square Baroque turret.	II
Apollo Theatre; 53.46954°N 2.22228°W		1938	Originally a cinema, it is in Modernist style, and built in red brick with a front of white glazed terracotta. It has two unequal storeys and an attic, and rounded corners. On the ground floor are doorways, and above are three-light windows, flanked by panels with Art Deco decoration. In the attic is a set-back centre with banded pilasters, small oblong windows, and a parapet. In the curved corners are small oblong and slit windows.	II
