= Ardwick =

District of Manchester, England

Coordinates: 53°28′20″N 02°12′58″W

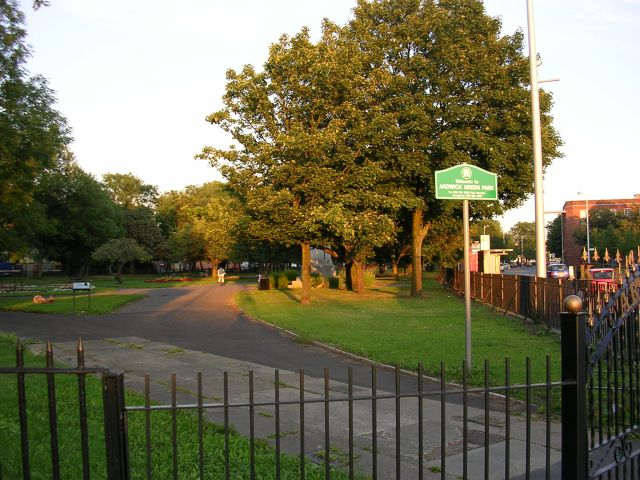
- Ardwick Green Park

- Location within Greater Manchester
- Population: 19,250 (2011 Census
- OS grid reference: SJ856975
- Metropolitan borough: Manchester
- Metropolitan county: Greater Manchester
- Region: North West
- Country: England
- Sovereign state: United Kingdom
- Post town: MANCHESTER
- Postcode district: M12 M13
- Dialling code: 0161
- Police: Greater Manchester
- Fire: Greater Manchester
- Ambulance: North West
- UK Parliament: Manchester Central
- Councillors: Alex-Salik Imran ((Green)); Amna Abdullatif ((Green)); Abdigafar Muse ((Labour))

Ardwick is an area of Manchester, England, one mile (1.5 kilometres) southeast of the city centre. The population at the 2011 census was 19,250.

Historically in Lancashire, by the mid-nineteenth century Ardwick had grown from being a village into a pleasant and wealthy suburb of Manchester, but by the end of that century became heavily industrialised. When its industries fell into decline so did Ardwick, becoming one of the city's most deprived areas. Substantial development has since taken place, including the construction of facilities for the 2002 Commonwealth Games at the nearby City of Manchester Stadium.

In the late nineteenth century, Ardwick had many places of entertainment, but the only remnant of that today is the Art Deco-style Manchester Apollo, a venue for pop and rock music concerts.

== History ==
Before the Industrial Revolution, Ardwick was a small village just outside Manchester in open countryside. The principal residents were the Birch family, one of whom was a major general when Oliver Cromwell (briefly) instituted direct military rule.

One Samuel Birch was instrumental in providing a small chapel of ease, dedicated to St. Thomas, and consecrated in 1741. This soon expanded into a Georgian church, to which a brick campanile was added in 1836. It contained a very rare Samuel Green organ, installed in 1787 or 1788, the first in which the sharp keys were distinguished in black. When the building ceased to be used as a church in 1978, the organ was rescued by an organ builder called George Sixsmith, and installed in St Paul's Church, Pendleton. There was also a memorial chapel to the dead of the First World War, chiefly men of the local territorial unit. These have been removed, and the building has been used as offices for voluntary organisations. The structure is now Grade II Listed.

Grand terraces of regency houses (some of which still survive) were built either side of the church, and these were fronted by Ardwick Green, a private park for the residents, containing a pond. Similar housing developments to those around the Green took place along Higher Ardwick and the area known as the Polygon.

Early inhabitants included members of Sir Robert Peel’s family. Charles Dickens drew many of his characters from life, and was a frequent visitor to Manchester. It is said that Dickens based the character of the crippled Tiny Tim in A Christmas Carol on the invalid son of a friend who owned a cotton mill in Ardwick.

Ardwick Cemetery was established in 1838 as a prestigious place for fashionable burials. By the time the cemetery closed in 1950, around 80,000 people had been buried there. John Dalton, the chemist and physicist best known for his advocacy of atomic theory, was amongst them. It was reported that some 100 coaches followed the funeral cortege to the cemetery on the day of his burial in 1844. Other notable interments, recorded on a plaque when the grounds were turned into a sports field in 1966, included Sir Thomas Potter, the first mayor of Manchester, who died in 1845, the Chartist Ernest Charles Jones, who died in 1869, and Buglar Robert Hawthorne, of the 52nd Light Infantry, who was awarded the Victoria Cross in 1857. Following the closure, the granite top of Dalton's tomb was relocated to the John Dalton building of Manchester Metropolitan University, where it lies beside a statue of the man.

The Grade II* listed Church of St Benedict on Bennet Street was erected in 1880 by the noted Gothic Revival architect J. S. Crowther. Although no longer in use as a place of worship, it still stands today and its tall red brick tower is visible for miles around.

Ardwick once had its own football team, Ardwick AFC, but following a meeting at the Hyde Road Hotel in 1894, it became Manchester City F.C. The Hyde Road ground, close to the maze of railway tracks extending outwards from Manchester Piccadilly station, was extended in a piecemeal fashion until it could hold crowds of 40,000, but the main stand was destroyed by a fire in 1923, and the club moved to a new stadium on Maine Road, Moss Side.

=== Industrial Revolution ===
During the nineteenth century, Ardwick became heavily industrialised and it was characterised by factories, railways and rows of back-to-back terraced houses being juxtaposed. Large numbers of Irish immigrants settled here, as they did throughout Manchester. Ardwick railway station is at a junction where the Manchester and Birmingham Railway, later the London and North Western Railway diverged from the line to Sheffield that became the Great Central Railway. Nicholls Hospital, a neo-gothic building that was later a school, was constructed on Hyde Road in the last quarter of the nineteenth century. More recently it has become the Nicholls Campus of the Manchester College.

The railway bridge across Hyde Road was known by older residents as the "Fenian Arch". On 18 September 1867 it was the scene of an attack upon a prison van carrying two Fenian prisoners to the former Belle Vue jail. One police officer was shot dead. Three Irishmen involved in the affray were caught, tried and executed. The men are referred to by their supporters as the "Manchester Martyrs".

Close to the bridge, which has been replaced by a modern concrete structure, is a family-run business called Hyde Road Wheels and Tyres. In 2005 they abandoned their premises in the railway arches, which had become run down, and completed the construction of a new glass-fronted building in November 2005. The project was an unexpected recipient of a "Built in Quality" award in February 2006. Twelve awards are given annually, and the garage was awarded the recognition, despite there being over 2,600 other construction projects in Manchester which were considered.

=== 20th Century ===
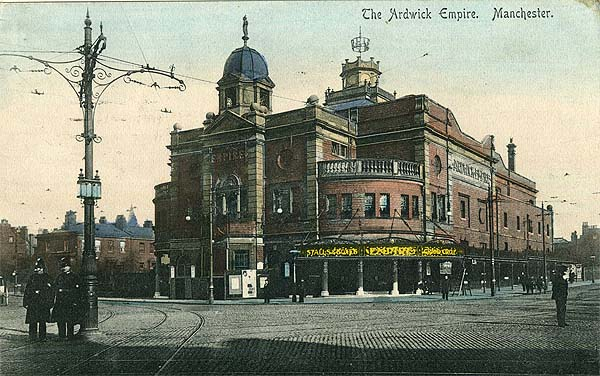
The Ardwick Empire Theatre, 1904

In 1904, a new variety theatre, the Ardwick Empire, opened on the corner of Hyde Road and Higher Ardwick overlooking Ardwick Green. It was an opulent building designed by the noted theatre architect Frank Matcham for Oswald Stoll. It became established as a centre of variety entertainment and billed performers such as Fred Karno, Dan Leno, Charlie Chaplin, Buster Keaton and Harry Lauder. Occasional Bioscope shows proved popular, and in 1930 it became a cinema, but continued to present variety acts on its stage. Stoll also owned another theatre in Manchester, the Manchester Hippodrome on Oxford Street. When this was demolished in 1935 to make way for a new Gaumont cinema, Stoll refurbished the Ardwick Empire and renamed it the New Manchester Hippodrome Theatre. Variety stars continued to appear on the stage, including Larry Adler, Max Wall and Joe Loss, and musical theatre shows such as The White Horse Inn and The Student Prince were staged. After 57 of popular entertainment, the New Hippodrome closed in 1961. There was a plan to concert it into a bowling allay, but the building was destroyed by fire in 1964 and subsequently demolished. Today, the site of the former Ardwick Empire remains empty and is used as a car park.

Historic architecture of Ardwick

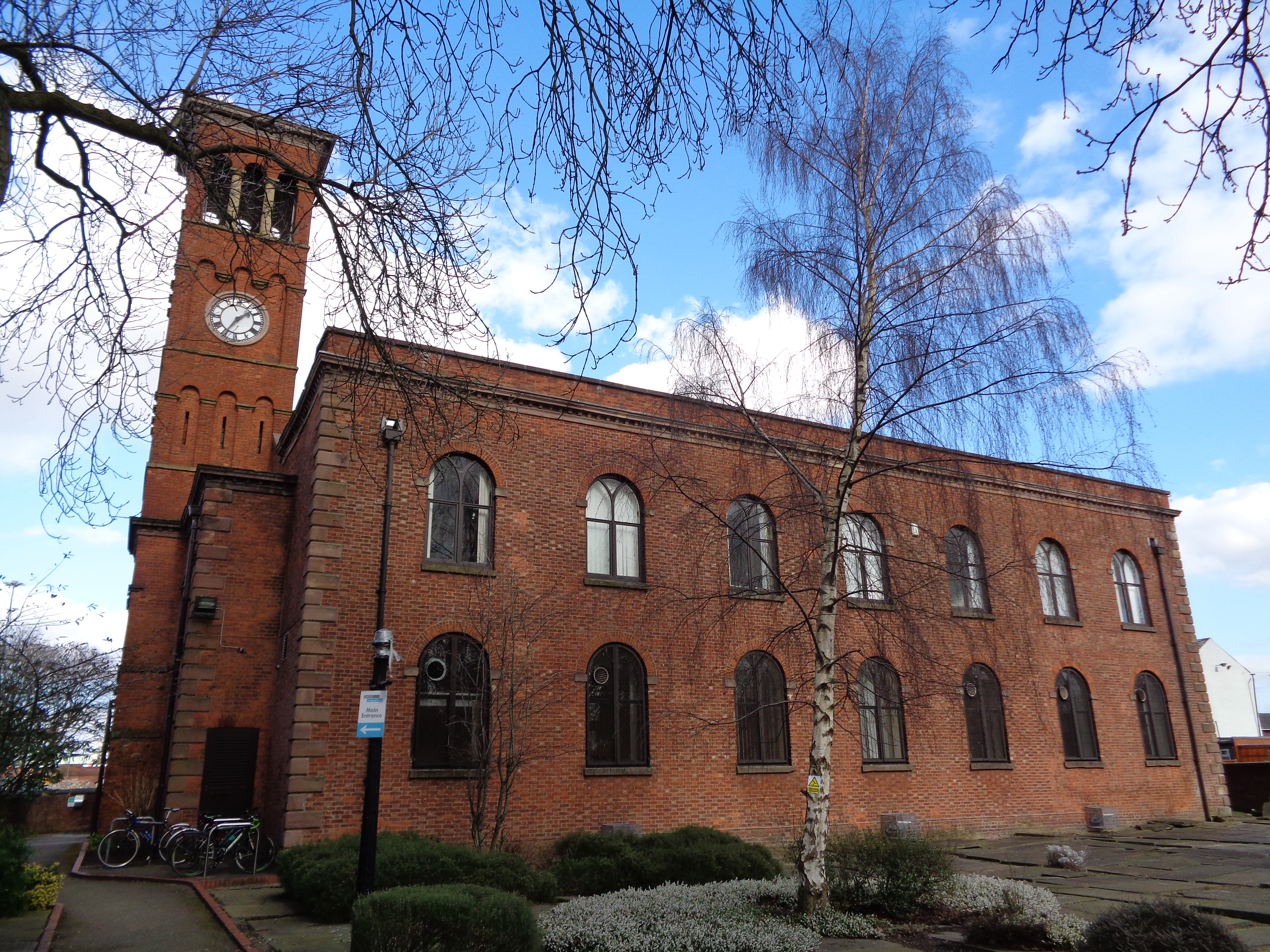
The Italianate St Thomas's, Ardwick

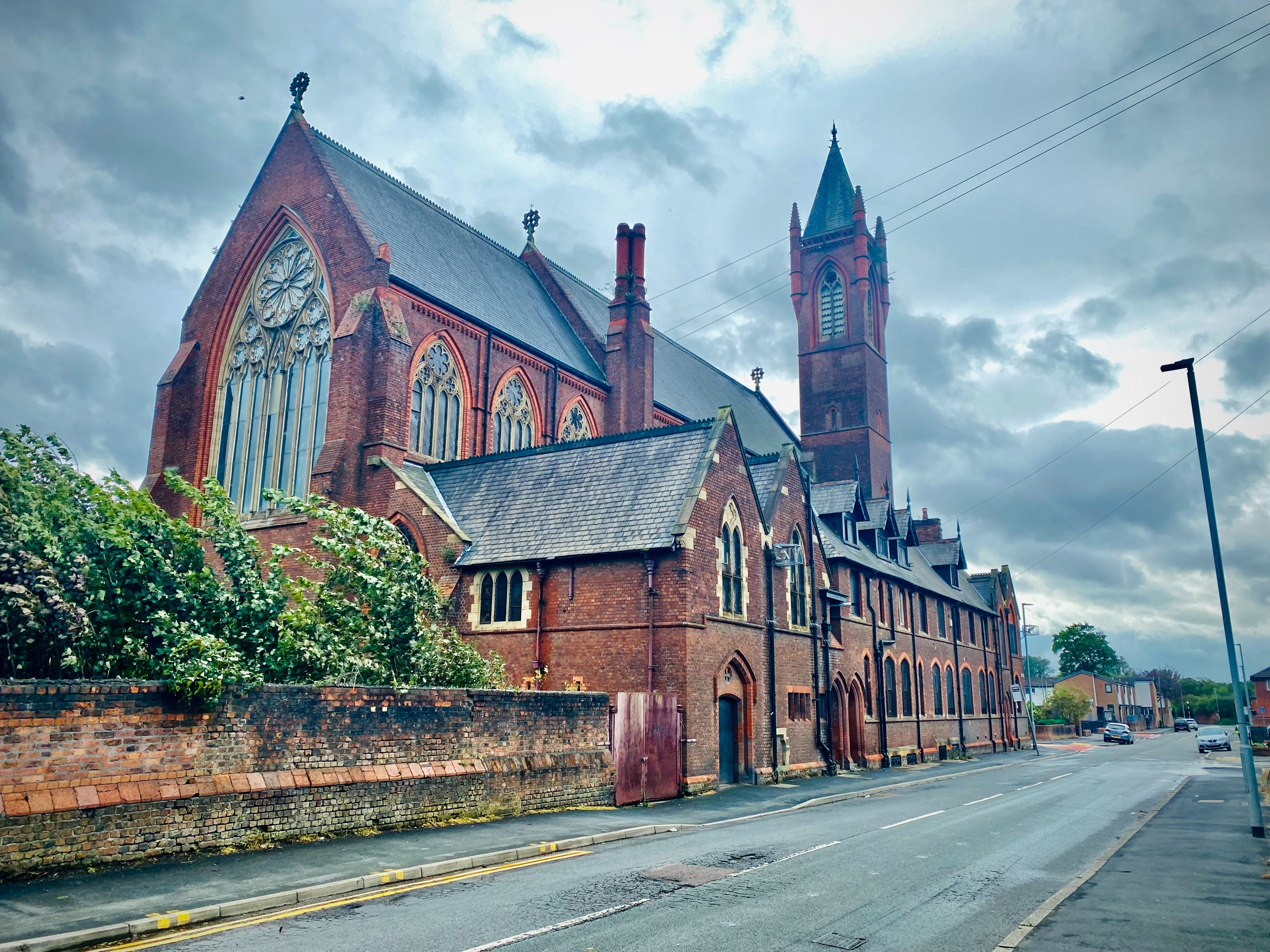
The Gothic Revival St Benedict's Church

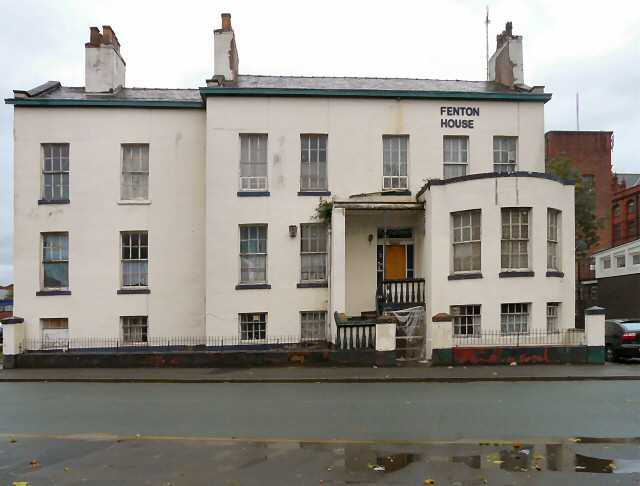
The Regency-style Fenton House on Higher Ardwick

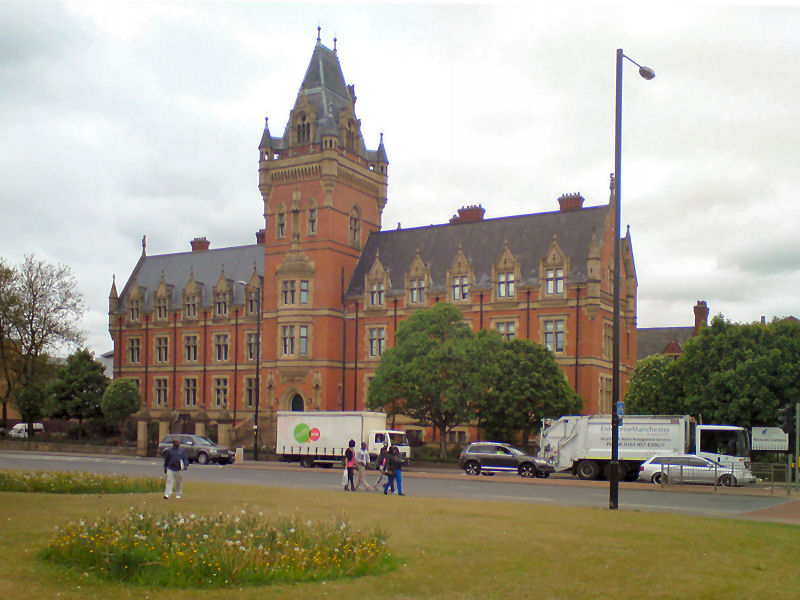
Nicholls Hospital on Hyde Road

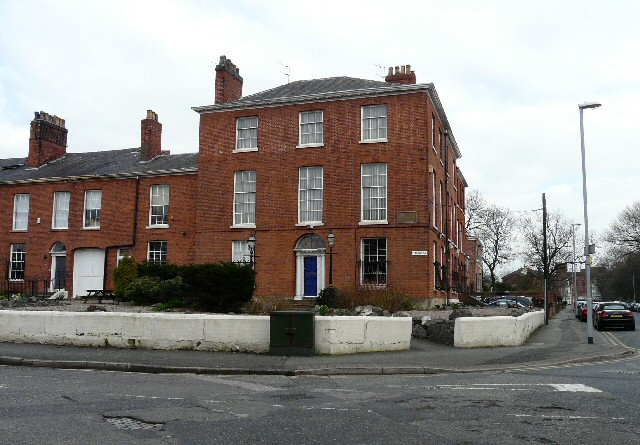
Regency houses on Manor Street

== Governance ==
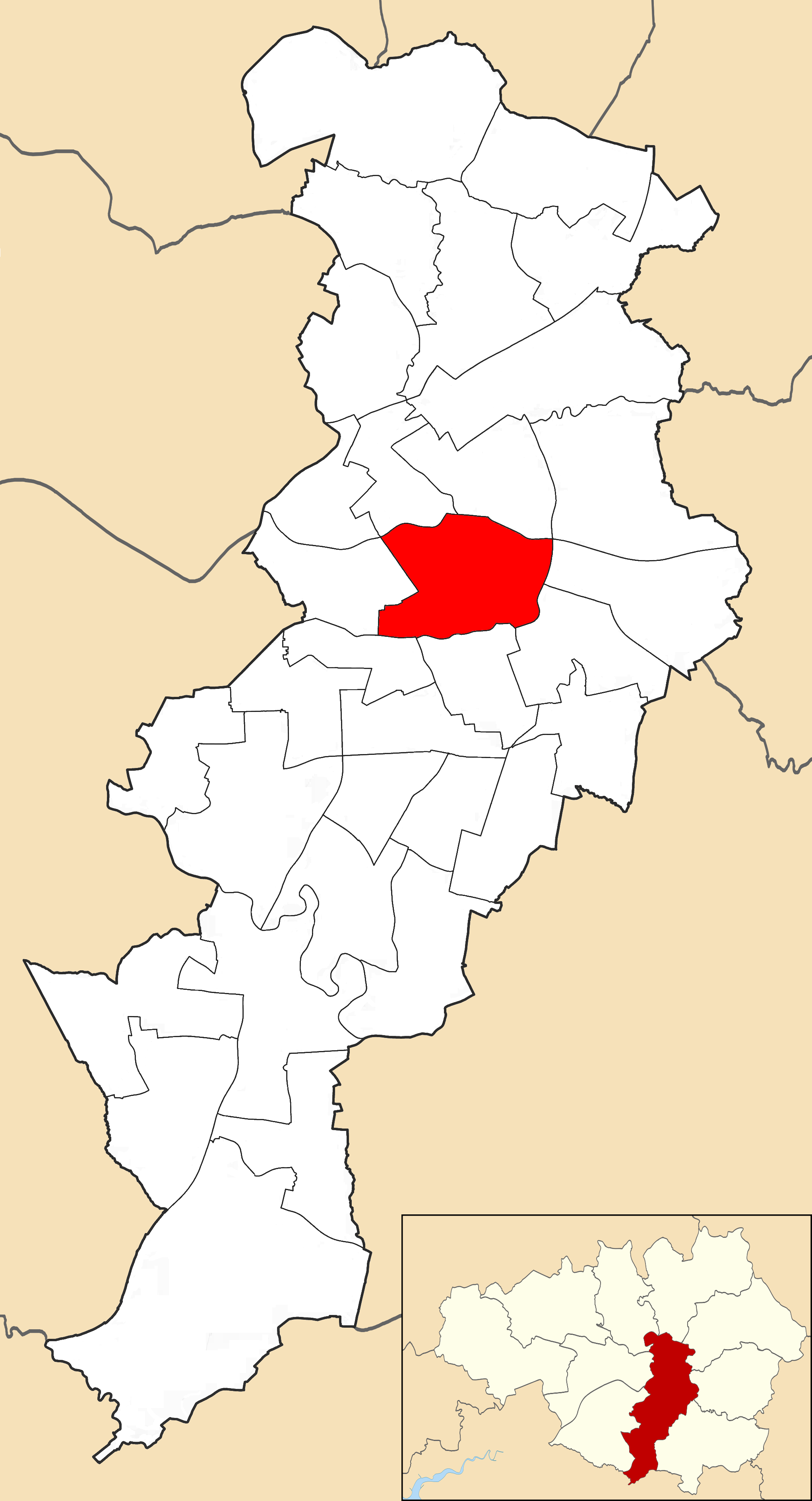
Ardwick electoral ward within Manchester City Council

Ardwick ward is represented by three councillors, Amna Abdullatif (Grn), Abdigafar Muse (Lab) and Alex-Salik Imran (Grn).

Former councillor Mavis Smitheman (2008–09) served as Lord Mayor of Manchester.

Election	Councillor	Councillor	Councillor
2018	Mavis Smitheman (Lab)	Bernard Priest (Lab)	Tina Hewitson (Lab)
2019	Amna Abdullatif (Lab)	Bernard Priest (Lab)	Tina Hewitson (Lab)
2021	Amna Abdullatif (Lab)	Bernard Priest (Lab)	Tina Hewitson (Lab)
2022	Amna Abdullatif (Lab)	Bernard Priest (Lab)	Tina Hewitson (Lab)
May 2023	Amna Abdullatif (Lab)	Abdigafar Muse (Lab)	Tina Hewitson (Lab)
Oct 2023	Amna Abdullatif (Ind)	Abdigafar Muse (Lab)	Tina Hewitson (Lab)
2024	Amna Abdullatif (Ind)	Abdigafar Muse (Lab)	Tina Hewitson (Lab)
April 2026	Amna Abdullatif (Grn)	Abdigafar Muse (Lab)	Tina Hewitson (Lab)
May 2026	Amna Abdullatif (Grn)	Abdigafar Muse (Lab)	Alex-Salik Imran (Grn)

indicates seat won in regular election. indicates seat won in by-election. indicates councillor changed party.

== Geography and administration ==
=== Civic history ===
The village of Ardwick can be traced back to 1282, when it was known as Atherdwic and the road between Manchester and Stockport runs through it. From mediaeval times Ardwick was an independent township in the ancient parish of Manchester within the Salford hundred of Lancashire. It became part of the Borough of Manchester on the borough's creation in 1838. The historic boundary between Ardwick and Manchester was the River Medlock. In 1866 Ardwick became a separate civil parish, on 26 March 1896 the parish was abolished to form South Manchester. In 1891 the parish had a population of 35,021.

== Transport ==
=== Railway ===
Ardwick railway station is on the Hope Valley Line and is served by only one service every weekday from Manchester Piccadilly to Rose Hill Marple.

The station opened in 1842 and was operated by a number of railway companies over the years. There were plans to close it in the 1980s and its future looked bleak for a long period after that, but closure plans were finally scrapped in 2006. The current service is operated by Northern. The station consists of a waiting shelter on a single island platform between the tracks, access to which requires the use of steps. The station is the site of a memorial to Paul McLaughlin, who died there on 13 December 1997.

Ardwick railway depot is a passenger multiple unit traction maintenance depot, located on the Hope Valley Line. It was opened in 2006 for the servicing of Siemens-built Class 185 DMUs, which are used on the TransPennine Express franchise. It was electrified in 2012–13 to allow the servicing of Siemens Class 350/4 EMUs.

=== Buses ===
Bus services in the area are provided by Stagecoach Manchester. The following routes serve Ardwick:

- 192: Manchester – Longsight – Levenshulme – Stockport – Stepping Hill Hospital – Hazel Grove
- 201: Manchester – Gorton – Denton – Hyde – Hattersley
- 202: Manchester – Gorton – Denton – Haughton Green – Hyde – Gee Cross
- 203: Manchester – Reddish – Belle Vue – Stockport
- 205: Manchester – Ardwick – West Gorton – Gorton – Dane Bank
- 219: Manchester – Openshaw – Guide Bridge – Ashton-under-Lyne – Stalybridge
- 220: Manchester – Openshaw – Audenshaw – Dukinfield – Stalybridge
- 221: Manchester – Openshaw – Audenshaw – Dukinfield

== Present day ==
Ardwick Green Park has recently been refurbished, and though the pond is no more, it still contains an interesting glacial erratic in the form of a boulder. There is also a cenotaph commemorating the Eighth Ardwicks, once a Territorial Army unit of the Manchester Regiment. Ardwick Green Barracks is a fine Victorian castellated structure bearing the old volunteer motto "Defence Not Defiance". It is still in military use today.

The Manchester Apollo, a 1930s Art Deco theatre, is one of Ardwick's most famous landmarks: it was in use as a cinema from 1943 and was renamed the ABC Ardwick in 1962. An independent operator took over in 1977 and staged pop concerts interspersed with the occasional film, until dropping films entirely. The venue now plays host to national and international performing artists.

Extensive demolition of dilapidated Victorian terraces took place around Ardwick during the 1960s. Some residents remained in the area in new council-owned houses and flats, while others were moved to overspill estates such as Hattersley.

== Demographics ==
(According to 2011 census)

- White British – 35.5%
- White Irish – 2.4%
- White Other – 5.4%
- Black or Black British – 17.7%
- Asian or Asian British – 27.4%
- Other – 5.5%
- Mixed Race – 6.0%

As of 2021, around 40% of Ardwick's residents were born outside of Europe.

As of 2016, nearly half (48.9%) of all households in Ardwick may be in need of intensive levels of support in order to manage their own health and prevent over-dependence on health services in the future. 61.9% of households in Ardwick may be described as 'deprived' in some way.

== Notable people ==
- Nellie Beer Lord Mayor of Manchester
- Samuel Birch (1735–1811), military officer, was owner of the Ardwick estate (1780–1795)
- Stephen Bradbury. Artist and illustrator. Born and brought up as a boy in Ardwick. Heywood House, Bennet Street.
- Edward Brotherton, 1st Baron Brotherton, businessman and philanthropist
- Joe Brown (1930–2020), climber, was born in Ardwick
- Tom Chantrell, designer of many film posters including The Sound of Music and Star Wars
- Harry H. Corbett, actor, moved to Ardwick after mother's death in Burma.
- Edward Evans, the last of the five Moors Murders victims, was from Ardwick. He was 17 years old when murdered in October 1965 by Ian Brady in Hattersley.
- Elizabeth Gaskell, lived in Gaskell House
- J. Milton Hayes, actor and poet, best known for his 1911 dramatic monologue "The Green Eye of the Little Yellow God"
- Samuel Hibbert-Ware geologist
- Samuel Hole (1819-1904), Anglican priest, author and horticulturalist, was born in Ardwick
- Khiara Keating, footballer for the England national team
- Leslie Lever, Baron Lever, lawyer and politician, MP for Ardwick
- Johnny Marr, guitarist, most notably of the Smiths
- Arthur Moreland, political cartoonist and artist
- John Howard Nodal, journalist and philologist
- Edmund Peck, the illegitimate son of Sir Edmund Buckley. Peck later took the surname Buckley and became Sir Edmund Buckley, 1st Baronet
- John Rylands, businessman and philanthropist
- Bill Tarmey (né William Piddington), actor and singer best known for his portrayal as Jack Duckworth in Coronation Street
- Ellen Wilkinson, MP, the Ellen Wilkinson High School, was named after her.
- Charlotte Seymour Yapp (1879–1934), British nurse, was born in Ardwick

== See also ==
- Listed buildings in Manchester-M12
