= Chorlton-on-Medlock Town Hall =

Listed building in Manchester, England

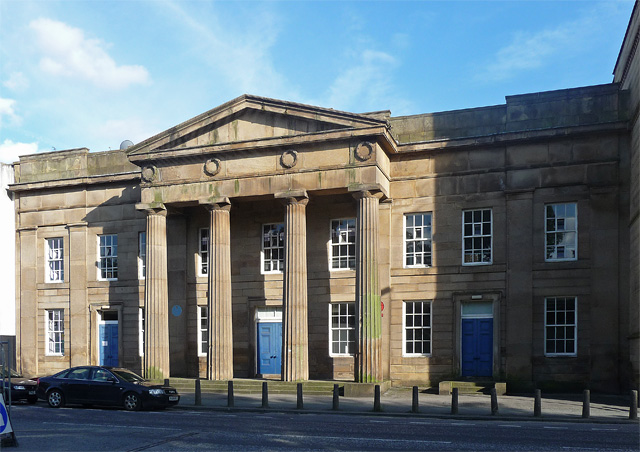
- Chorlton-on-Medlock Town Hall

General information
- Architectural style: Neoclassical style
- Location: Cavendish Street, Chorlton-on-Medlock, Manchester, England
- Coordinates: 53.4698°N 2.2375°W
- Year(s) built: 1831

Design and construction
- Architect(s): Richard Lane
- Designations

Listed Building – Grade II
- Official name: Former Town Hall Facade to Mabel Tylecote Building, Manchester Metropolitan University
- Designated: 25 February 1952
- Reference no.: 1283062

Chorlton-on-Medlock Town Hall is a former municipal building in Cavendish Street in Chorlton-on-Medlock, Manchester, England. The structure, of which only the façade is original, is a Grade II listed building.

== History ==
=== 19th century ===
After significant population growth in the late 18th century, mainly associated with the township's status as a residential suburb, the police commissioners who administered the area decided to procure a town hall. Construction work started on the new building on 13 October 1830. It was designed by Richard Lane in the neoclassical style, built in ashlar stone and was officially opened on 14 October 1831.

The design involved a symmetrical main frontage with nine bays facing onto Cavendish Street with the end bays slightly projected forward and with pilasters to support an entablature; the central section of three bays, which also slightly projected forward, featured a full-height tetrastyle portico with Doric order columns supporting an entablature, a frieze with four paterae, and a pediment. The building was fenestrated with sash windows on both floors. Internally, the principal room was the assembly hall, but the building also included rooms for the police commissioners, the poor law guardians and the local dispensary.

The town hall ceased to be the local seat of government when the municipal borough of Manchester was formed in 1838. Instead the building became a divisional police headquarters in 1842 and continued to operate in that role into the 20th century. The building was also used as an events venue: the conductor, Charles Seymour, performed his quartet series in the town hall in the early 1850s. The Manchester School of Art was built on an adjacent site to the southwest and completed in 1881.

=== 20th century–present ===
The Fifth Pan-African Congress was held in the former town hall from 15 October to 21 October 1945: attendees included the future President of Malawi, Hastings Banda, the future President of Ghana, Kwame Nkrumah, and the future Premier of Western Nigeria, Obafemi Awolowo, as well as the future President of Kenya, Jomo Kenyatta. Decisions taken at that conference led to independence for a number of these countries.

On 25 February 1952, the building was Grade II listed.

The building was remodelled in the early 1970s, with the façade retained but the interior of the building demolished to create a new refectory for the School of Art, which by that time had become part of the new Manchester Polytechnic. The Mabel Tylecote Building, named after the Labour politician, Dame Mabel Tylecote, was built on an adjacent site to the northeast and was completed in 1973. Manchester Metropolitan University, which evolved from Manchester Polytechnic after a rebranding in 1992, decided to redevelop the site with a proposed new arts and humanities building in 2018. The construction work, which was carried out by Morgan Sindall to a design by Allies and Morrison, involved the demolition of both the 1970s building behind the town hall façade and the Mabel Tylecote Building: the work, which also included the restoration and cleaning of the town hall façade, was completed and the complex re-opened in December 2020. The project was highly commended in North West Project of the Year category for Constructing Excellence in 2020.

== See also ==
- Listed buildings in Manchester-M15
