= Listed buildings in Manchester-M15 =

Manchester is a city in Northwest England. The M15 postcode area is to the southwest of the centre of the city and includes the areas of Hulme, and parts of Moss Side and Chorlton-on-Medlock. The postcode area contains 32 listed buildings that are recorded in the National Heritage List for England. Of these, two are listed at Grade II*, the middle grade of the three grades, and the others are at Grade II, the lowest grade.

Hulme and Moss Side, to the west of the area, contain mainly industrial and residential buildings. The industrial buildings that have survived and are listed include a floodgate, canal offices, a former canal warehouse, a canal, a brewery, a former cotton mill, and a flour mill. Elsewhere are houses, churches and associated buildings, a former public house, a railway bridge, a boundary stone, and two former theatres. In Chorlton-on-Medlock most of the listed buildings are university buildings, although many have been altered from their original purposes. This part of the area also includes a church and an art gallery.

== Key ==
Grade	Criteria
II*	Particularly important buildings of more than special interest
II	Buildings of national importance and special interest

== Buildings ==
Name and location	Photograph	Date	Notes	Grade
Boundary stone 53.47342°N 2.25203°W	—	18th century (probable)	The boundary stone is in sandstone, and consists of a low slab with a rounded top and a canted face. It contains lettering which is mainly illegible.	II
Floodgate; 53.47337°N 2.25199°W	—	1765 (probable)	The stone floodgate was designed by James Brindley as part of a hydraulic system to control the flow of water between the River Medlock and the Bridgewater Canal, diverting the water through a culvert.	II
Bridgewater Canal offices 53.47266°N 2.25485°W	—	c. 1800	The building, which has had various uses, is in red brick on a rendered plinth, with sandstone dressings, a modillioned cornice, and a slate roof with coped gables. It is in Georgian style, with an L-shaped plan. There are two storeys and 10 bays with two pediments and sash windows. At the left end is a single-storey single-bay extension that has a doorway with a moulded surround, a fanlight, and a cornice.	II
Hulme Barracks; 53.46833°N 2.26425°W		c. 1807	Originally a house, in 1817 it was converted for use as an officers' mess, and later made into flats. It is in red brick, partly rendered at the rear, with sandstone dressings, a dentilled cornice, and hipped slate roofs. It is in Georgian style, with two storeys and a basement, and consists of a main block with five bays, the middle three bays projecting under a pediment, a three-bay wing to the right, and a cross-wing to the right of this. In front of the main block is a rectangular loggia with square pillars, and entablature, a cornice, and wrought iron railings. The doorway is round-headed with a fanlight, and the windows are sashes. At the rear is a two-storey segmental bow window.	II
St George's Church, Hulme; 53.47214°N 2.25930°W		1826–1828	A Commissioners' church designed by Francis Goodwin in Perpendicular style, and restored in 1884 by J. S. Crowther. It is in sandstone with slate roofs, and consists of a nave, north and south aisles with a porch at the west end of each aisle, a chancel with a polygonal apse, and a west tower. The tower has four stages, buttresses rising to form octagonal traceried pinnacles, a west doorway, a clock face, and an openwork parapet with crocketed spirelets. Along the aisles the bays are separated by buttresses rising to pinnacles with embattled parapets between. At the east end of the nave are corner turrets.	II*
Churchyard walls, gate piers and gates, St George's Church, Hulme; 53.47196°N 2.25984°W	—	1826–1828 (probable)	The dwarf sandstone walls with railings enclose most of the four sides of the churchyard. On each side is a pair of octagonal gate piers with chamfered plinths, buttressed angles, traceried Gothic panels, and caps with carved shields. The gates are in cast iron, their top panels having Perpendicular tracery.	II
Middle Warehouse; 53.47320°N 2.25601°W		1828–1831	The former warehouse is in red brick with sandstone dressings. It has five storeys and a symmetrical front of 26 bays, the ten middle bays containing a giant segmental blank arch with two segmental-arched shipping holes, all the arches with keystones. Most of the windows are small and round-headed, and between some are five stage loading slots. At the rear is a central projection. (Note: Street View in June 2015 shows that the warehouse has been converted for residential use.)	II
Former town hall façade 53.46990°N 2.23771°W		1830–31	The façade is all that remains of Chorlton-on-Medlock Town Hall, and it forms the front of the Mabel Tylecote Building. It was designed by Richard Lane in Greek Revival style. The building is in sandstone, and has two storeys and a symmetrical front of nine bays, the outer bays projecting slightly. The ground floor is rusticated, the end bays have pilasters, and there is an entablature with a frieze, a cornice and a parapet. In the centre is a tetrastyle portico of fluted Doric columns with four paterae on the frieze. There are three doorways with moulded architraves, and the windows are sashes.	II
Former Manchester Ear Hospital; 53.47027°N 2.23942°W		1831	Originally a house, later used for other purposes, and in 1987 converted into offices, with only the façade remaining. This is in red brick on a stone plinth, with sandstone dressings, a sill band, and an eaves cornice. There are three storeys and a cellar, and a symmetrical front of three bays. Steps lead up to a central doorway with engaged Ionic columns, an entablature with a cornice, and a three-pane fanlight. Above the doorway is a window with a pedimented architrave and an apron. The windows are sashes.	II
Hulme Locks Branch Canal; 53.47347°N 2.26166°W		1838	The canal was built to link the Bridgewater Canal and the Mersey and Irwell Navigation. It is in sandstone, brick and concrete, and consists of a canal arm with a passing pound, a turning basin, a lock with gates in timber and steel, and a steel bridge spanning the lock.	II
St Wilfrid's Church, Hulme; 53.46905°N 2.25297°W		1840–1842	A Roman Catholic church designed by A. W. N. Pugin in Early English style, now redundant and converted into offices. Three confessionals were added to the south aisle in the 1860s by E. W. Pugin. The church is in red brick with sandstone dressings and a slate roof, and consists of a nave with north and south aisles, a south porch, confessionals, a chancel with a north chapel, and an uncompleted tower at the northwest with a pyramidal roof. On the north side of the tower is an arched doorway with a moulded surround and two pairs of shafts, and a niche above.	II
Railway bridge over canal (east); 53.47147°N 2.26565°W		c. 1850	The bridge carries the railway over the Bridgewater Canal.	II
St Mary's Church, Hulme; 53.46134°N 2.25160°W		1853–1858	The church, designed by J. S. Crowther in Geometrical style, is now redundant and used for other purposes. It is in sandstone with slate roofs, and consists of a nave with a clerestory, north and south aisles, north and south porches, a chancel, and a northwest steeple. The steeple has a four-stage tower with angle buttresses, a corbel table with a gargoyle in the centre of each side, a parapet with crocketed corner pinnacles, and a tall octagonal tower with four tiers of lucarnes that rises to a height of 241 feet (73 m). At the east ends of the nave and aisles are corner pinnacles.	II*
Moss Side People's Centre; 53.46110°N 2.25089°W	—	1855–1860	Originally a school and teacher's house, since used for other purposes, it is in red brick with slate roofs and is in Gothic style. The building has a hall range parallel to the street, a domestic wing to the left, two cross-wings at the right, and other wings. In the hall range is an arched doorway with a chamfered surround, and gabled windows. Elsewhere are windows that are mullioned or mullioned and transomed.	II
St Mary's House; 53.46092°N 2.25124°W	—	1855–1860	Originally a rectory, the house is in brown brick with sandstone dressings and a red tiled roof, and is in Gothic style. There are two storeys and four bays, the outer bays gabled, and the right bay with a half-hipped roof. On the front are two buttresses, and an arched doorway with a quatrefoil fanlight. In the left bay is a three-light arched window, in the middle two bays the ground floor windows have two lights and cusped heads, and on the upper floor are mullioned windows in half-dormers with hipped roofs, and in the right bay the windows are mullioned.	II
St Mary's Junior School; 53.46091°N 2.25186°W	—	1855–1860	The school, later used for other purposes, is in red brick with bands in blue brick and a slate roof. It consists of a single-storey hall and a two-storey cross-wing, at the same height. The hall has two tall gabled transomed windows, and a gabled porch in the angle that has an arch doorway with a chamfered surround and a hood mould. In the north wall is a large 14-light transomed window.	II
Playground wall, St Mary's Junior School; 53.46087°N 2.25211°W	—	1855–1860	The wall surrounds the west, north and east sides of the playground. It is a dwarf wall in brown brick with a string course in black brick, and coping in ashlar stone. On the wall are cast iron railings, and in the west side is an arched gateway with a double-chamfered surround.	II
Churchyard wall, St Mary's Church; 53.46172°N 2.25186°W	—	1856–1858	The wall forms a boundary around the churchyard, and is curved on the corners. It was designed by J. S. Crowther, and is in sandstone on a chamfered plinth, with steeply pitched coping. At the west end are cast iron gates.	II
Hydes Anvil Brewery; 53.45971°N 2.25454°W		1861	The brewery consists of ranges of buildings around a long courtyard, built in red brick with stone dressings and slate roofs. At the entrance are elaborate gate piers, and to the left is a two-storey four-bay building with quoins, bands, and a modillion cornice, and containing sash windows. Further back the buildings have two or three storeys, the rear building having a central gable with a clock and an ornamental finial.	II
Former Albert Mill; 53.47116°N 2.26393°W	—	1869	The former cotton mill is in red brick with sandstone dressings, sill bands, an impost band, a stylised Lombard frieze and a coped parapet with a dated upstand. There are four storeys and a basement, five bays on Hulme Hall Road, and eight on Ellesmere Street, with a three-bay extension to the west. The openings have segmental heads, and on Ellesmere Street are two projecting towers.	II
Former Turville public house 53.46997°N 2.26505°W		c. 1870	The former public house is in red brick with sandstone dressings, a sill band, a prominent ground-floor cornice, oversailing eaves, and a slate roof. It is in Italianate style, standing on a corner, and has a triangular plan with seven bays on both long fronts. There are two storeys with cellars and attics, and a round-headed doorway with a cornice. The windows on the ground floor are rectangular, and on the upper floor they are round-headed with imposts, keystones, and arch bands. The attic contains dormers with hipped roofs and an oriel window above the doorway.	II
Pharmacy Department; 53.46513°N 2.23649°W	—	1874	Originally a medical school designed by Alfred Waterhouse, and later extended, it is in yellow brick with sandstone dressings and a red tiled roof. The building has an L-shaped plan, with a main block of four storeys, and rear wings with two storeys. The main block has nine bays and corner pinnacles with spirelets. The windows are sashes with two or three lights, and on the roof is a flèche.	II
Chapel building, Loreto College; 53.46143°N 2.25273°W		1874–1876	The chapel is in polychromic brick, with stone dressings, and a slate roof, pyramidal at the east end, with pierced ridge tiles, and a metal cross. There are two storeys with the chapel on the upper floor and a hall below. The east end is canted, and the west end is gabled. The interior of the chapel is richly decorated.	II
Grosvenor Building; 53.46971°N 2.23819°W		1880–81	The building was designed by G. T. Redmayne in Gothic style, and it was extended at the rear in 1898. The building is in sandstone, with dressings in red brick and buff terracotta, and slate roofs. There are two storeys and basements, and a front of nine bays, the outer bays larger with gables and pinnacles. In the centre is a doorway with a chamfered surround, a moulded arch and carved spandrels, above which is a canted oriel window with a crocketed gable, corner pinnacles and a finial. Flanking this are arcaded bays containing rectangular windows with a parapet above.	II
Ormond Building; 53.46984°N 2.23902°W		1881	Offices with a rectangular plan on a corner site, in red brick with sandstone dressings, sill bands, corner pilasters, corbel tables, moulded cornices, a parapet, partly balustraded, and a slate roof. There are two storeys and a basement, with fronts of nine and eight bays, and a turret on the corner. The round-headed ground floor windows have two lights, shafts, and moulded heads with mask keystones. On the upper floor are round-headed sash windows with corniced architraves. The turret is octagonal and has a domed roof with a lantern.	II
Whitworth Gallery; 53.46033°N 2.22905°W		1894–1900	The front of the art gallery is in red brick on a plinth, with terracotta dressings, a sill band, corbel tables, a moulded cornice, a parapet, and green slate roofs, and is in free Jacobean style. There are two storeys and a basement, and the central nine bays have a balustraded parapet that continues over a large semicircular porch with paired Ionic columns and a frieze. On the upper floor are cross-windows with a bowed window in the centre. Flanking the main range are towers with canted oriel windows, corner pinnacles, and pyramidal roofs. On the roof ridge is a lantern with pedimented faces.	II
Former Canal Flour Mills; 53.47371°N 2.25967°W		1896	The former flour mill is in Italianate style. It is in red brick with a four-span slate roof, and has four storeys with a basement, a tower, and a chimney in the style of a campanile. Most of the openings have segmental heads, and there are gables of varying types. At the north end is a shipping hole, and a sprinkler tower.	II
Hulme Hippodrome; 53.46457°N 2.24993°W		1901	The former theatre is in red brick, partly rendered, with dressings in glazed white brick and with a roof of slate and corrugated metal. It has a central section of three storeys and three bays, and wings of two storeys and three bays. On the middle floor are large windows and on the top are sash windows, all with segmental heads. Inside is detailed decoration.	II
The Playhouse; 53.46426°N 2.24946°W		1902	The former theatre, which was used for some years by the BBC, is in red brick with dressings in glazed white brick, a parapet with a dentilled band, and a slate roof. These are three storeys and a basement, and fronts of eight bays, with six bays on the sides. On the upper floor are casement windows. Inside there is Baroque-style plasterwork.	II
Righton Building; 53.46938°N 2.23870°W		1905	Originally a draper's shop, later part of a college, it has a front of white glazed brick and buff terracotta, a sill band, a frieze, a cornice, a shaped parapet, and a roof in slate and glass. The building is on a corner site and has a rectangular plan with a chamfered corner, two storeys and cellars and fronts of eleven and five bays. On the ground floor is a doorway, two oriel windows and three oval windows, the other windows having been altered. The upper floor contains alternating oriel and transomed windows with upstands.	II
School House; 53.47024°N 2.25451°W	—	1908	A school, later converted into flats, in red brick with a hipped roof in Welsh slate. It has three and four storeys and is in Jacobean style. The front facing the street has nine bays, the middle three bays projecting and canted, and it contains mullioned and transomed windows. The entrances are on the side, and on the top are pavilion roofs.	II
St Augustine's Church; 53.46989°N 2.23987°W		1967–68	A Roman Catholic church in dark brown brick with felt roofs, and a rear range in brick with timber cladding. It has an almost square plan with a link to a cross-wing. The church has a recessed central entrance approached by steps, with a projection to the left containing a ceramic plaque with a star and a mitre. To the right are four full-height fins, with a figure of the Madonna on the inner face of the first fin.	II

== Notes and references ==
=== Sources ===
- Historic England, "Boundary stone on Knott Mill Bridge, Manchester (1282975)", National Heritage List for England
- Historic England, "Floodgate on east side of Knott Mill Bridge, Manchester (1210156)", National Heritage List for England
- Historic England, "Bridgewater Canal Offices, Manchester (1283068)", National Heritage List for England
- Historic England, "Hulme Barracks, Manchester (1247392)", National Heritage List for England
- Historic England, "Church of St George, Manchester (1208640)", National Heritage List for England
- Historic England, "Churchyard walls, gate piers and gates at Church of St George, Manchester (1197789)", National Heritage List for England
- Historic England, "Middle Warehouse, at former Castle Field Goods Yard, Manchester (1208653)", National Heritage List for England
- Historic England, "Former town hall facade to Mable Tylecote Building, Manchester Metropolitan University, Manchester (1283062)", National Heritage List for England
- Historic England, "Former Manchester Ear Hospital, Manchester (1197922)", National Heritage List for England
- Historic England, "Hulme Lock Branch Canal, Manchester (1208196)", National Heritage List for England
- Historic England, "Roman Catholic Church of St Wilfrid, Manchester (1283075)", National Heritage List for England
- Historic England, "Railway bridge over canal, the east of two at SJ 824 972, Manchester (1283078)", National Heritage List for England
- Historic England, "Church of St Mary, Manchester (1270659)", National Heritage List for England
- Historic England, "Moss Side People's Centre, Manchester (1270695)", National Heritage List for England
- Historic England, "St Mary's House, Manchester (1271229)", National Heritage List for England
- Historic England, "St Mary's Junior School, Manchester (1208702)", National Heritage List for England
- Historic England, "Playground wall of St Mary's Junior School, on west, north and east sides, Manchester (1197792)", National Heritage List for England
- Historic England, "Boundary wall to churchyard of Church of St Mary, Manchester (1270671)", National Heritage List for England
- Historic England, "Hydes Anvil Brewery, Manchester (1291088)", National Heritage List for England
- Historic England, "Former Albert Mill on west corner of junction with Ellesmere Street, Manchester (1200817)", National Heritage List for England
- Historic England, "Turville public house, Manchester (1283069)", National Heritage List for England
- Historic England, "Pharmacy Department, Department of Adult Education, University of Manchester, Manchester (1209002)", National Heritage List for England
- Historic England, "Chapel Building, Loreto College, Manchester (1389525)", National Heritage List for England
- Historic England, "Grosvenor Building, Manchester Metropolitan University Faculty of Art and Design, Manchester (1293192)", National Heritage List for England
- Historic England, "Ormond Building, Manchester Metropolitan University (Formerly municipal offices), Manchester (1219718)", National Heritage List for England
- Historic England, "Whitworth Gallery, Manchester (1246569)", National Heritage List for England
- Historic England, "Former Canal Flour Mills, Manchester (1200858)", National Heritage List for England
- Historic England, "Hulme Hippodrome, Manchester (1283070)", National Heritage List for England
- Historic England, "The Playhouse, Manchester (1293008)", National Heritage List for England
- Historic England, "Righton Building, Manchester (1197781)", National Heritage List for England
- Historic England, "School House, Manchester (1197761)", National Heritage List for England
- Historic England, "Roman Catholic Church of St Augustine, Manchester (1392331)", National Heritage List for England
- Historic England, Listed Buildings
- Hartwell, Clare; Hyde, Matthew; Pevsner, Nikolaus (2004), Lancashire: Manchester and the South-East, The Buildings of England, New Haven and London: Yale University Press, ISBN 0-300-10583-5
