= Holehird Gardens =

Coordinates: 54.3993°N 2.9096°W

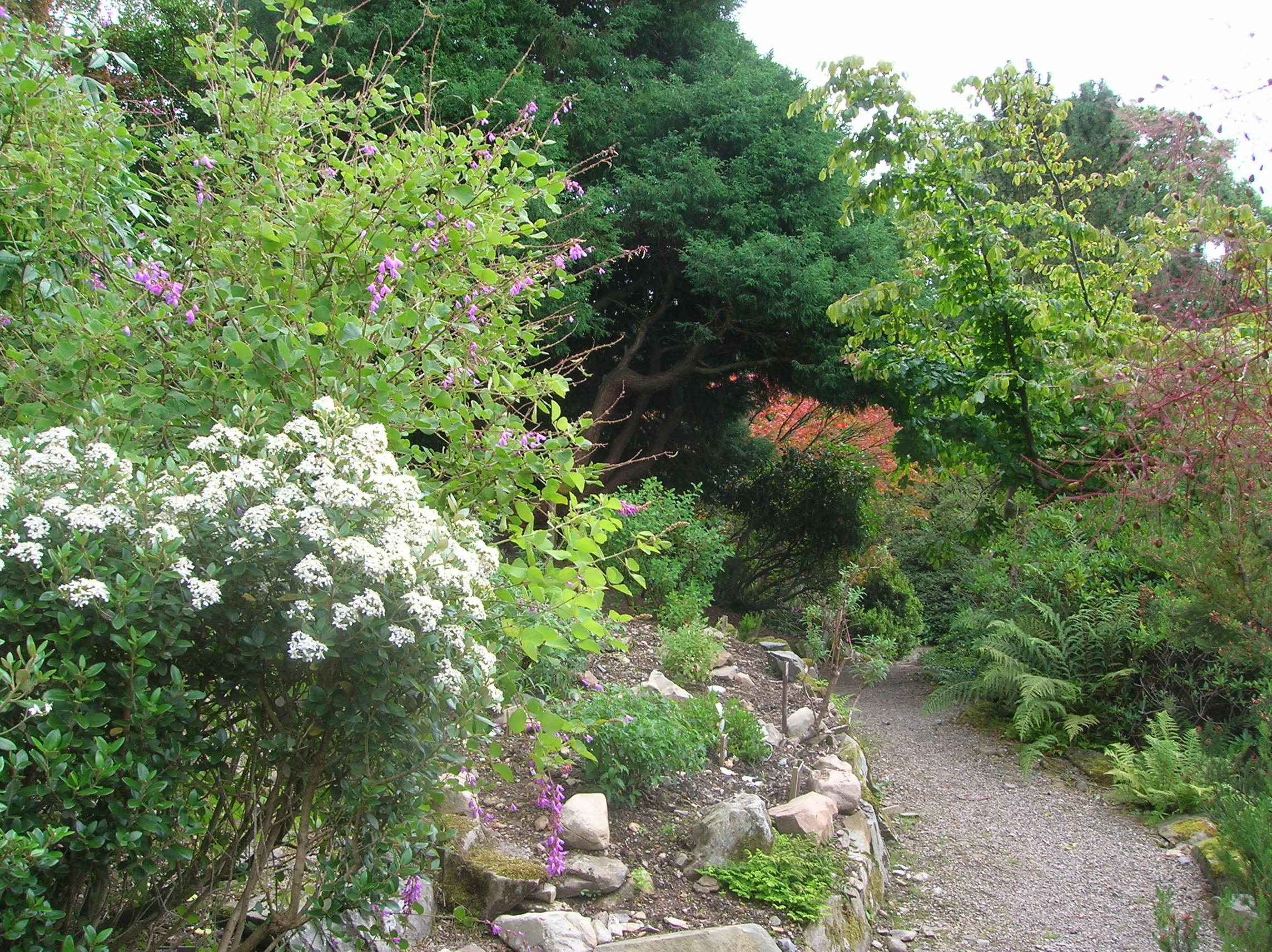
A pathway leading through Holehird Gardens

Holehird Gardens is an extensive 10-acre site located near Windermere, Cumbria, England. It is the home of the Lakeland Horticultural Society. The garden consists of a large variety of plants, particularly those suited to the local climate with its high rainfall. It is made up of extensive rock and heather gardens, alpine houses, and a walled garden which is of particular interest for its herbaceous borders. It was once voted by BBC gardeners to be one of the nation's favourite gardens.

== History ==
Holehird was built in the 1860s as a private home to a design by J. S. Crowther. The house was used by Leonard Cheshire Disability until 2020.

The garden was created in the late nineteenth century by three successive owners of the mansion. The landscape architect Thomas Mawson enlarged the garden in 1902. However, by 1945 it became too expensive to maintain and it was effectively abandoned and totally overgrown.

In 1969 the Lakeland Horticultural Society was formed and began to rescue the derelict garden. The staff at the gardens are all volunteers from the Lakeland Horticultural Society. They are the planters, weeders, propagators, designers and administrators. The guidebook "The Best of Britain" described it as a garden with "numerous different areas to explore including rock heather and walled gardens and herbaceous borders all bursting with colourful plants and enhanced with stunning views". The astilbes are a national Plant Heritage collection.

== Access ==
The garden is open to the public throughout the year. Donations are invited for the upkeep of the gardens. There are also openings as part of the National Gardens Scheme. Holehird has been a regular participant in a "daffodil day", which the NGS organises in Cumbria.

== Gallery ==
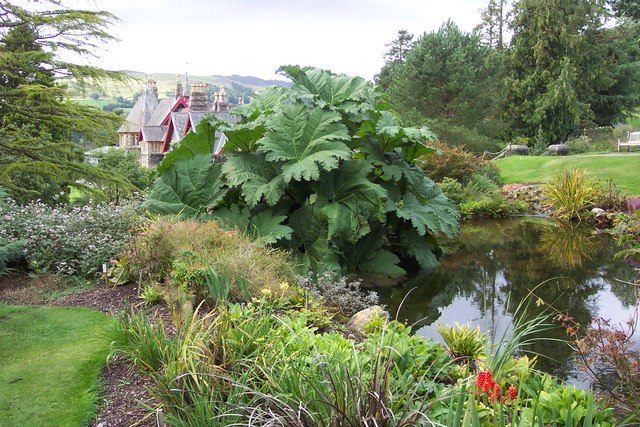
A water feature at Holehird Garden with a partial view of the house in the background

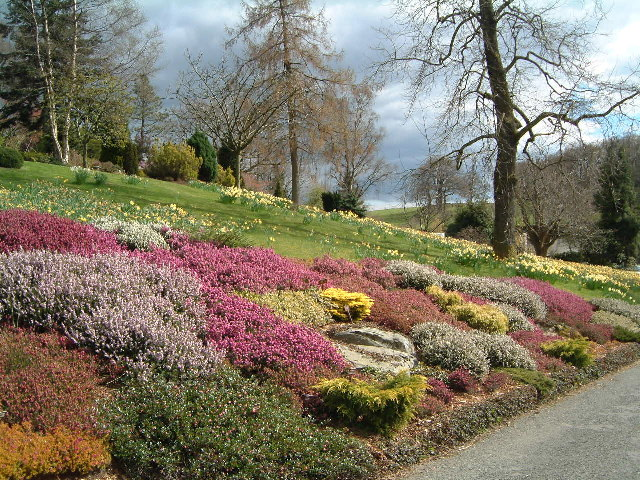
A Spring-time floral display at Holehird Garden.

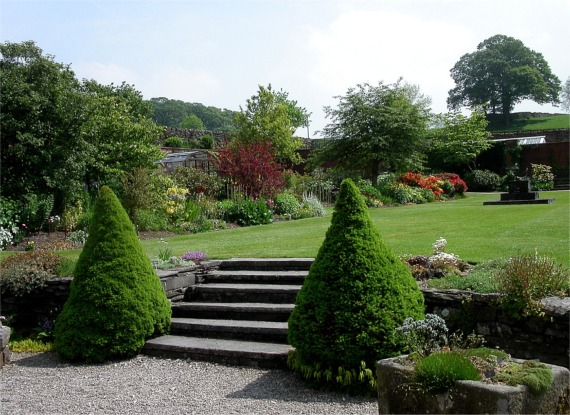
An expanse of lawn surrounded by flowers within the walled garden.
