= Ardwick Green Barracks =

- Manchester
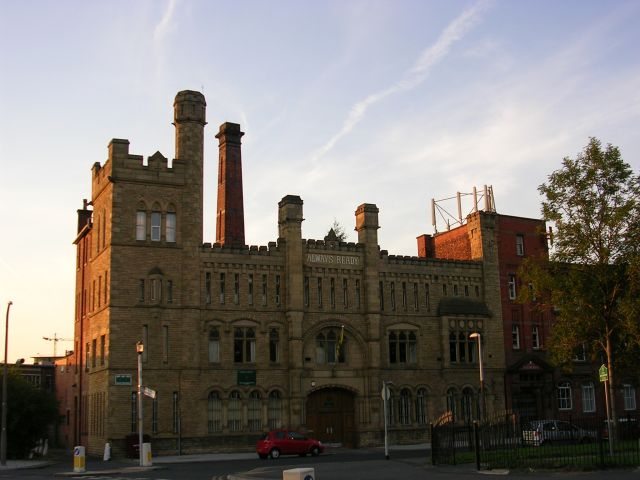
- Ardwick Green Barracks

Site information
- Type: Barracks
- Owner: Ministry of Defence
- Operator: British Army

Location
- Location within Greater Manchester
- Coordinates: 53.47132°N 2.22594°W

Site history
- Built: 1887
- Built for: War Office
- In use: 1887-2018

Ardwick Green Barracks is a former military installation in Ardwick, Manchester.

== History ==
The barracks were designed by Lawrence Booth as the headquarters of the 5th (Ardwick) Volunteer Battalion, The Manchester Regiment; they were completed in 1886 and opened by Prince George, Duke of Cambridge, Commander-in-Chief of the Forces in September 1887. The 5th (Ardwick) Volunteer Battalion evolved to become the 8th battalion the Manchester Regiment in 1908. The battalion was mobilised at the drill hall in August 1914 before being deployed to Gallipoli and ultimately to the Western Front.

During the Second World War, the barracks were used a detention centre for deserters. After the War the barracks were restored to use as the headquarters of 8th battalion of the Manchester Regiment. They became home to the Manchester Regiment (Ardwick and Ashton) Territorials in 1967 and then became base to C Company of 5th/8th (Volunteer) Battalion of the King's Regiment in 1971. This unit evolved to become C (King's) Company of the King's and Cheshire Regiment, still based at Ardwick Green, in 1999. From 2006, the barracks were the home of D (Inkerman) Company of the 4th Battalion of the Duke of Lancaster's Regiment. The barracks were vacated in 2018, and put up for sale following year.

== See also ==
- Listed buildings in Manchester-M12
