= Church of St Mary, Hulme =

Former church in Manchester, England

Church of St Mary
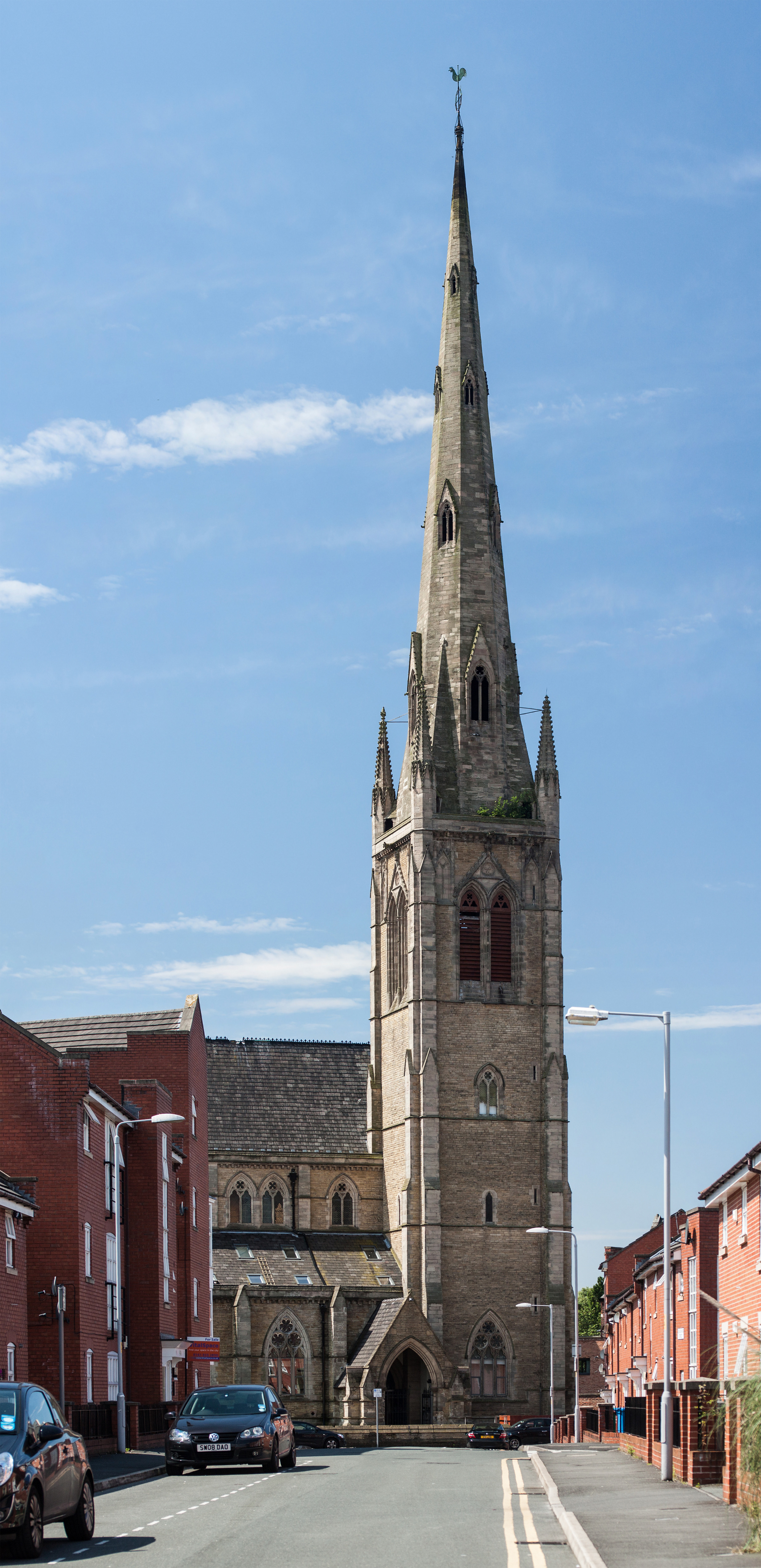
- The church in 2012

- Location within Greater Manchester
- 53.4613°N 2.2516°W
- OS grid reference: SJ 83396 96089
- Address: Upper Moss Lane, Hulme, Manchester
- Country: England
- Denomination: Anglicanism (formerly)

History
- Former name: Shaw Ardell African Methodist Evangelical Church
- Status: Converted to residential
- Founder: Wilbraham Egerton
- Consecrated: 13 November 1858

Architecture
- Heritage designation: Grade II*
- Designated: 3 October 1974
- Architect: J. S. Crowther
- Architectural type: Gothic Revival
- Years built: 1853–1858
- Construction cost: £16,000
- Closed: 1978

Specifications
- Height: 241 feet (73 m)
- Materials: Sandstone, ashlar

The Church of St Mary is a Gothic Revival former Anglican church on Upper Moss Lane in Hulme, an inner city area of Manchester, England. Built between 1853 and 1858 for Wilbraham Egerton and designed by J. S. Crowther, it was consecrated in 1858 and became known for its exceptionally tall spire and large capacity. After closing in 1978, the building was converted into flats, while its altar screen was relocated to the Church of the Ascension. St Mary's forms a group with the former school, rectory and Moss Side People's Centre, and has been noted for its survival through repeated phases of urban decline and redevelopment.

== History ==
The church was constructed between 1853 and 1858, according to its official listing. It was founded by Wilbraham Egerton, whose family owned land in Hulme, and designed by J. S. Crowther at a cost of £16,000. Wilbraham died in 1856 before the building was completed, and its final stages were overseen by his son, William Tatton Egerton. St Mary's was consecrated on 13 November 1858 by James Prince Lee, the first Bishop of Manchester.

The spire, at 241 feet (73 m), was the tallest in the north of England at the time of building. The church was designed to accommodate 1,000 people, with 692 free places and 308 appropriated places.

On 3 October 1974 the church, then used by the Shaw Ardell African Methodist Evangelical Church, was designated a Grade II* listed building.

St Mary's closed in 1978, although its altar screen was preserved and later installed in the Church of the Ascension on Royce Road. The building has since been converted into flats, and a contemporary architectural review described the interior as "horribly divided".

The former church forms a group with St Mary's Junior School, St Mary's Rectory, and the Moss Side People's Centre. The Pevsner Buildings of England volume for Manchester describes the Church of St Mary as having "stood through two complete cycles of urban decay, dereliction, destruction and renewal, standing alone amid utter desolation in the 1960s and again in the 1990s".

== Architecture ==
The church is constructed of sandstone with dressed stone details and has a slate roof. It is designed in a Gothic Revival style and consists of a large nave and chancel with aisles on both sides, and a very tall steeple at the north‑west corner. The tower rises in four stages with corner buttresses and a sequence of differently shaped window openings. At the top it has a carved parapet with pinnacles and a slender octagonal spire that includes small openings on several levels.

The nave has five bays and is marked by vertical pilasters, carved bands beneath the parapet, and paired clerestory windows with varied decorative stops. A large west window fills much of the end wall. The chancel, almost the same height as the nave, has three bays with clerestory windows set between blind arches, and a tall east window with multiple lights and elaborate tracery.

The aisles are supported by buttresses and have large arched windows with intersecting stonework and carved stops. At the west end of each aisle is a gabled porch with corner buttresses and an arched outer doorway. The south porch has shafted sides and more elaborate moulding, while the north porch has semi‑octagonal supports and wrought‑iron gates. Both porches have timber roofs with scissor‑bracing and inner doorways with moulded surrounds and doors fitted with decorative strap hinges.

== See also ==
- Grade II* listed buildings in Greater Manchester
- List of works by J. S. Crowther
- Listed buildings in Manchester-M15

== Bibliography ==
- Hartwell, Clare; Hyde, Matthew; Pevsner, Nikolaus (2004), Lancashire: Manchester and the South East, The Buildings of England, Yale University Press, ISBN 0-300-10583-5
