= The Turville =

Listed former pub in Manchester, England

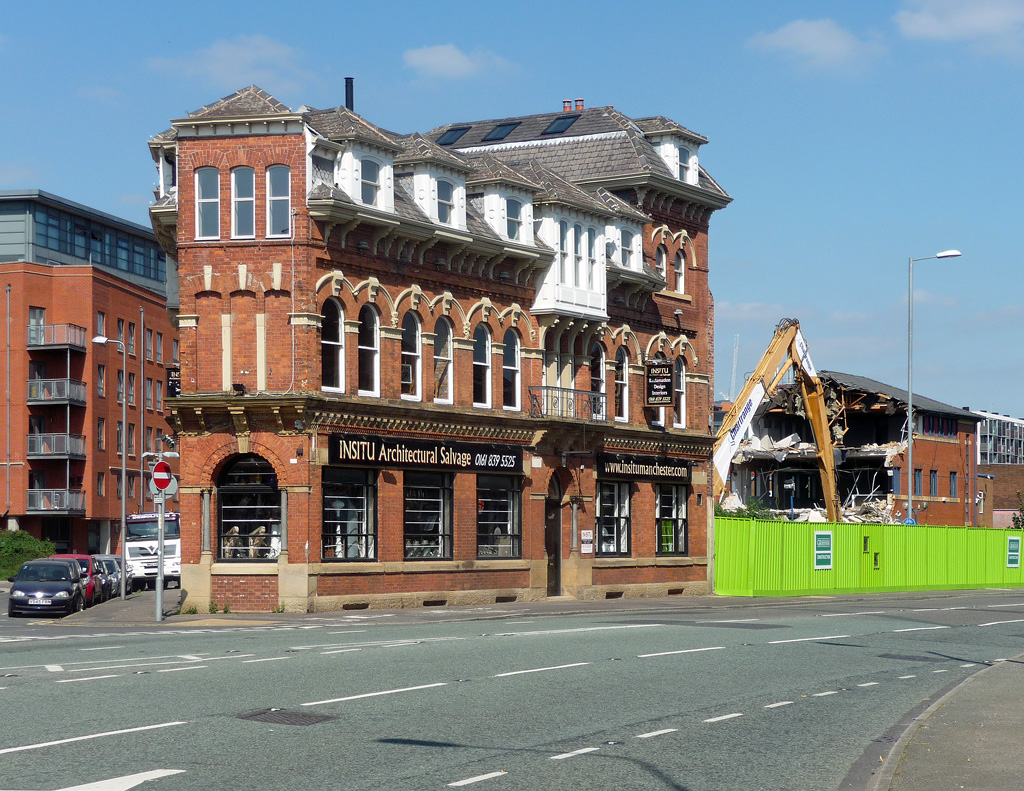
- The former pub in 2016
- Former names: Commercial Hotel; Last Hop
- Alternative names: Insitu Manchester

General information
- Status: Converted to commercial use
- Type: Public house (former)
- Location: 252 Chester Road, Hulme, Manchester, England
- Coordinates: 53.4699°N 2.2652°W
- Year built: c. 1870; 156 years ago (probable)

Design and construction
- Designations

Listed Building – Grade II
- Official name: Former Turville public house
- Designated: 6 June 1994
- Reference no.: 1283069

Website
- insitumanchester.com

The Turville (now trading as Insitu Manchester) is a Grade II listed former public house on Chester Road in Hulme, an inner city area of Manchester, England. Probably built around 1870, it later ceased trading as a pub and has been occupied since at least 1994 by Insitu, an architectural salvage and antiques business.

== History ==
The building was probably constructed in the 1870s and originally traded as the Commercial Hotel. According to a summary of Bob Potts' The Old Pubs of Hulme and Chorlton‑on‑Medlock (1997), the hotel was later renamed the Turville public house and subsequently the Last Hop. The same source records that the house received a spirits licence in 1896. The pub remained in use through the 20th century and had closed by 1994, when the building was taken over by Insitu, an architectural salvage and antiques business that has occupied the premises since then. On 6 June 1994, the building was designated a Grade II listed structure.

== Architecture ==
The building is constructed of red brick with stone detailing and has a slate roof. It occupies a sharply angled corner plot, giving it a triangular footprint, and is designed in an ornate Italianate style. It has two main storeys with a cellar and attic, and long side elevations divided into seven bays. The ground floor has a horizontal band and a projecting roofline above it, while the upper floor contains a row of arched windows. The eaves project, with a small oriel dormer set above the entrance, and the attic contains large dormer windows with hipped roofs.

Near the east end are arched doorways with recessed shafts and heavy cornices. The ground floor has wide rectangular openings, and the first floor has arched windows with stone imposts, keystones, and moulded surrounds. The west end consists of a single bay with a former doorway now converted to a window, and above it a row of blind arched panels.

== See also ==
- Listed buildings in Manchester-M15
- Listed pubs in Manchester
