= Ellen Wilkinson High School =

Listed building in Manchester, England

The Manchester College Nicholls Campus
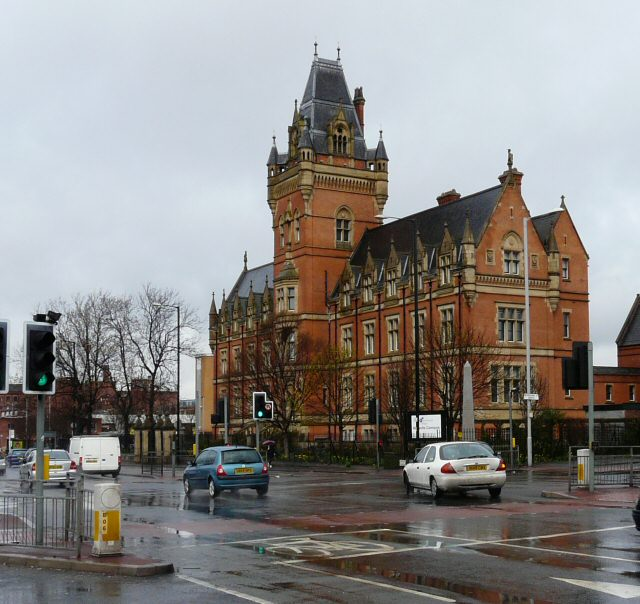
- The former Ellen Wilkinson High School in 2009

- Location within Greater Manchester
- Former names: Nicholls Hospital, Nicholls Secondary Boys School, Nicholls Ardwick High School, Ellen Wilkinson High School

General information
- Architectural style: Flemish Gothic
- Location: Hyde Road, Ardwick, Manchester, England
- Coordinates: 53.4692°N 2.2165°W
- Year built: 1878–1880

Design and construction
- Architect: Thomas Worthington
- Designations

Listed Building – Grade II*
- Official name: Former Nicholls Hospital including gymnasium, governor's house, stone setted and flagged forecourt, boundary walls and gates, stone gate piers on Ford Street and Devonshire Street, and two granite memorials in the forecourt
- Designated: 3 October 1974
- Reference no.: 1291812

Website
- Nicholls Campus website

The Manchester College Nicholls Campus (officially listed as Former Nicholls Hospital and later known as Ellen Wilkinson High School) is a Grade II* listed building on Hyde Road in Ardwick, an area of Manchester, England. Built between 1878 and 1880 to designs by Thomas Worthington and funded by Benjamin Nicholls as a memorial to his son, it originally served as an orphanage and bluecoat school. The building was used as the Nicholls Secondary Boys School from 1952 to 1967 and subsequently became Ellen Wilkinson High School. After the school's merger in 2000, the site was acquired by MANCAT and, following further institutional changes in 2008, became a principal campus of the Manchester College.

== History ==
The building was constructed between 1878 and 1880, according to its official listing, and was originally a bluecoat school. It was designed by Thomas Worthington, and funded by Benjamin Nicholls as a memorial to his son, John Ashton Nicholls. Nicholls commissioned Worthington to prepare the designs, with instructions that construction should begin only after his own death. It was Worthington's last significant commission in the city. The original use was as an orphanage, with the Ashton family contributing over £100,000 towards its construction and endowment.

From 1952 to 1967, the building was used as the Nicholls Secondary Boys School. On 3 October 1974, the former Nicholls Hospital was designated a Grade II* listed building. The school later amalgamated with Ardwick High School. It was initially known as Nicholls Ardwick High School but in 1983 was renamed in honour of Ellen Wilkinson, a socialist, feminist and first female Minister for Education, who was born in Ardwick. The school became noted for its strong emphasis on the arts, anticipating specialist‑school status by several decades.

In 2000, following the merger of Ellen Wilkinson High School into Cedar Mount High School in Gorton, the former school site was acquired by the Manchester College of Arts and Technology (MANCAT). In 2008, after MANCAT merged with City College Manchester, the site became a principal campus of the newly formed Manchester College.

== Architecture ==
The building is constructed of red brick with pale sandstone and has slate and lead roofs. It is designed in a Flemish Gothic style, with simple, flat‑headed windows and decoration that becomes more elaborate higher up. It has two tall main floors with a basement and attic, and a symmetrical 11‑bay front facing south. A central tower projects forward and rises to about 130 feet (40 m). The design shows clear similarities to Worthington's City Police Courts on Minshull Street. Worthington is thought to have intended carved animal figures for the tower, and Pevsner later suggested that most had been removed in the 20th century. However, an 1879 lithograph shows the tower without such carvings, and the 2010 Pevsner volume does not repeat the claim.

The front has continuous stone bands, corner turrets, and gabled dormers. The tower has two stages above the roofline, with a carved parapet, small octagonal turrets, and a steep roof. The entrance sits at the base of the tower, reached by a long flight of steps with stone balustrades, and framed by a pointed arch and flanking niches. Above are tiered stone projections with small windows and a niche at the top.

The side wings have regular stone‑framed windows on all floors, with slightly projecting dormers at attic level and decorative gables. Rainwater pipes run between the bays. The entrance steps span a wide basement area enclosed by a stone retaining wall with buttresses. Behind the main front, the gymnasium and governor's house sit slightly set back.

The west end repeats the main detailing, with matching corner turrets and a carved roundel. It also carries shields and motto panels linked to the building's original use. A small tower containing lavatories stands to one side, with narrow windows and simplified stone bands. Modern links connect this area to the gymnasium.

The rear elevation is symmetrical, with a tall central block flanked by the rear walls of the main range and the lavatory towers. The roof valleys contain tall chimney stacks. The rear has gabled dormers, stone‑framed windows, and several full‑height chimney breasts. The central block includes two gabled towers beside a polygonal tower with steep roofs and matching Gothic details. Behind this, the main tower repeats the front's form except for a tall chimney replacing the upper window.

The east end mirrors the west, with some later inserted openings. At the base of the lavatory tower, a short wall extends back to a low arched gateway leading to the governor's house, above which a small corridor links the two buildings.

== See also ==
- Grade II* listed buildings in Greater Manchester
- Listed buildings in Manchester-M12
