= Cedar Mount Academy =

Coordinates: 53.4520°N 2.1817°W

- Manchester, England; United Kingdom

Information
- Type: Academy
- Established: 2012
- Department for Education URN: 138097 Tables
- Ofsted: Reports
- Headteacher: K. Hodgeson
- Staff: 58
- Age: 11 to 16
- Enrollment: 824
- Colours: Green, Yellow, Black
- Website: Cedar Mount Academy

Cedar Mount Academy is an academy in Gorton, Manchester, England. The school caters for boys and girls aged 11–16 years and is located in the East of the city of Manchester.

The school has moved into the new building with Melland High School called Gorton Education Village. They moved into this new state-of-the-art building in 2008. The school has its own website in which parents can visit in which to gain information, make inquiries and read about upcoming events.

== Academy Status ==
In late 2011/early 2012 it was announced that Cedar Mount High School would be transformed into Cedar Mount Academy. On 1 August 2012 Cedar Mount had officially gained its academy status.

== House System ==
Cedar Mount has a house system which is incorporated in the school life. There are four houses which the system offers, each of which is named after a gem:

House Name	House Colour
Sapphire	Blue
Ruby	Red
Emerald	Green
Diamond	Yellow

== History ==
=== Former schools ===
At Spurley Hey school, there was an arson attack on the morning of Saturday 14 February 1987.

=== Formation ===
Cedar Mount High School was founded in 2000, after the merger of Ellen Wilkinson High School and Spurley Hey High Schools on the Mount Road site in Gorton

During the Conservative Party conference which was held in Manchester in 2011, Prime Minister David Cameron visited the school on 4 October 2011. There he met the staff from Cedar Mount High School along with a handful of Year 11 pupils. He did a live video call to the conference from the school where he described the school as "absolutely inspirational" and congratulated the headteacher, stating that "It's not rocket science. It's about good leadership." Cameron also praised the schools future ambitions and rise in standards.

On 1 June 2012 Cedar Mount had officially turned into an academy.

== Joining of schools ==
The school's decision to join with Melland High School was made between Judith O'Kane, headteacher of Melland's High School, and former headteacher of Cedar Mount High School, Guy Hutchence. They believed that "inclusion was priority", and as a result, both shared a dream of the two schools joining, where SEN and mainstream students could mingle, and work in the same school.

In the words of O'Kane, the joining was a "complete success" and "had went better than we could have hoped".

== Notable former pupils ==
=== Spurley Hey High School ===
- Judi Shekoni, actress
- Robert Owen, musician

=== Spurley Hey Secondary Modern School ===
- Wayne Fontana (Glyn Ellis), 1960s musician with The Mindbenders, known for A Groovy Kind of Love
- Brian Statham, England test cricket fast bowler

=== Cedar Mount High School ===
- Katie Thistleton, television presenter

== See also ==
- Spurley Hey Comprehensive School, former school in Rotherham
