= Church of St Benedict, Ardwick =

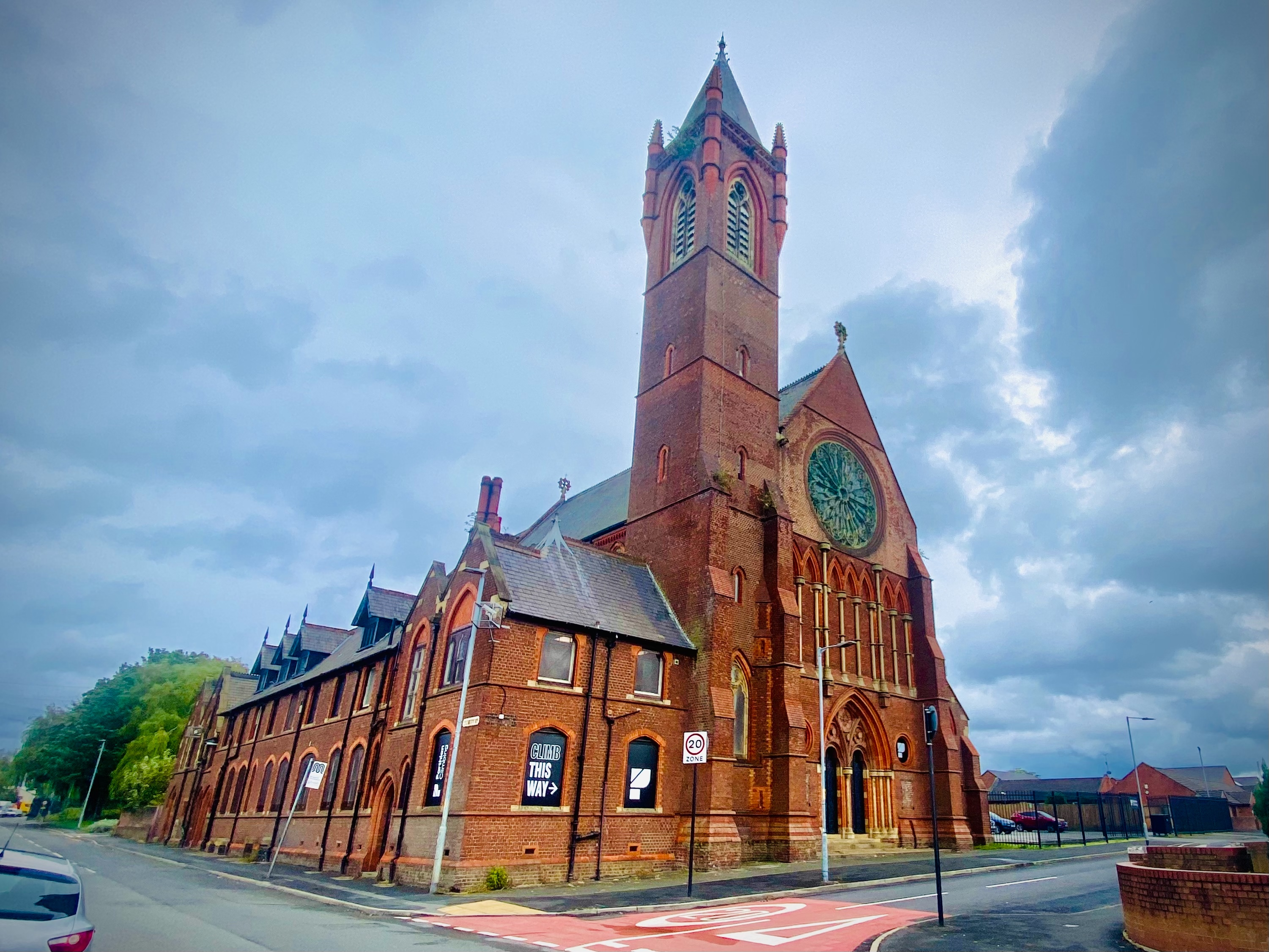

- Location in Manchester
- 53.4695°N 2.2039°W
- OS grid reference: SJ 86558 96989
- Location: Ardwick, Manchester
- Country: England
- Denomination: Church of England

History
- Status: Parish church
- Dedication: St Benedict

Architecture
- Functional status: Redundant
- Heritage designation: Grade II* listed
- Designated: 26 February 1966
- Architect: J. S. Crowther
- Style: Gothic Revival

Specifications
- Materials: Brick

The Church of St Benedict is a redundant church in the Ardwick district of Manchester, England. The church is dedicated to the saint Benedict of Nursia, was designed by J. S. Crowther for a Manchester merchant John Marsland Bennett, and built in 1880. It is generally considered to be Crowther's masterpiece and is a Grade II* listed building. Declared redundant in the early 2000s, the church was home to Parthian Climbing Manchester, formerly the Manchester Climbing Centre. Parthian Climbing Manchester closed permanently in July 2025.

== History ==
John Marsland Bennett (1817–1889) was a prosperous stone merchant who served two terms as Mayor of Manchester between 1863 and 1865. He lived at Buile Hall in Salford. Approached to donate land for a church to serve the growing community of Ardwick, he agreed both to provide the site and fund the building of the church. He also selected J. S. Crowther as architect, acted as project manager and took a keen interest in the church liturgy. Construction began in 1877 and the church was complete by 1880. In addition to the church, Crowther built an attached clergy house and Sunday School. The work cost Bennett £20,000.

St Benedict's followed the Anglo-Catholic High Church tradition, offering masses rather than services. Falling attendance in the 20th century saw the church declared redundant and it closed in 2002. (Note: The Church of England Heritage Record for St Benedict's incorrectly records the church as being unlisted.) In 2005, the church building reopened as the Manchester Climbing Centre. Its potential as an indoor climbing centre was identified by a British climber, John Dunne, who had been looking for a suitable building in which to establish a club in North West England. (Note: John Dunne features in the 1998 British rock-climbing film, Hard Grit.) The centre has one of the largest climbing walls in Europe.

== Architecture and description ==
Bennett's commission to Crowther emphasised that he wanted a church "plain but massive...[with] a shell which would be standing years after many cheap, 'dressy' churches had crumbled to ruins". Crowther obliged; St Benedict's is "remarkably large", built of red brick with stone and terracotta dressings. The style is Early English Gothic, Crowther himself dating it, rather precisely, as "Early Geometric Decorated of the year 1245". The nave is very high, with a hammerbeam roof and ending in a tall tower. (Note: The height of the nave was the principal attraction to John Dunne, who had seen climbing centres constructed in other redundant churches in England but none which offered the scale and size of St Benedict's.) The clergy house and Sunday school buildings are attached to the north side. St Benedict's has been a Grade II* listed building since 3 October 1974, its Historic England listing record describing it as "the most original of JS Crowther's church designs."

== Sources ==
- Hartwell, Clare; Hyde, Matthew; Pevsner, Nikolaus (2004). Lancashire: Manchester and the South East. The Buildings of England. New Haven, US and London: Yale University Press. ISBN 978-0-300-10583-4.
- Hartwell, Clare (2001). Manchester. Pevsner Architectural Guides. New Haven, US and London: Yale University Press. ISBN 978-0-300-09666-8.
