= Patera (architecture) =

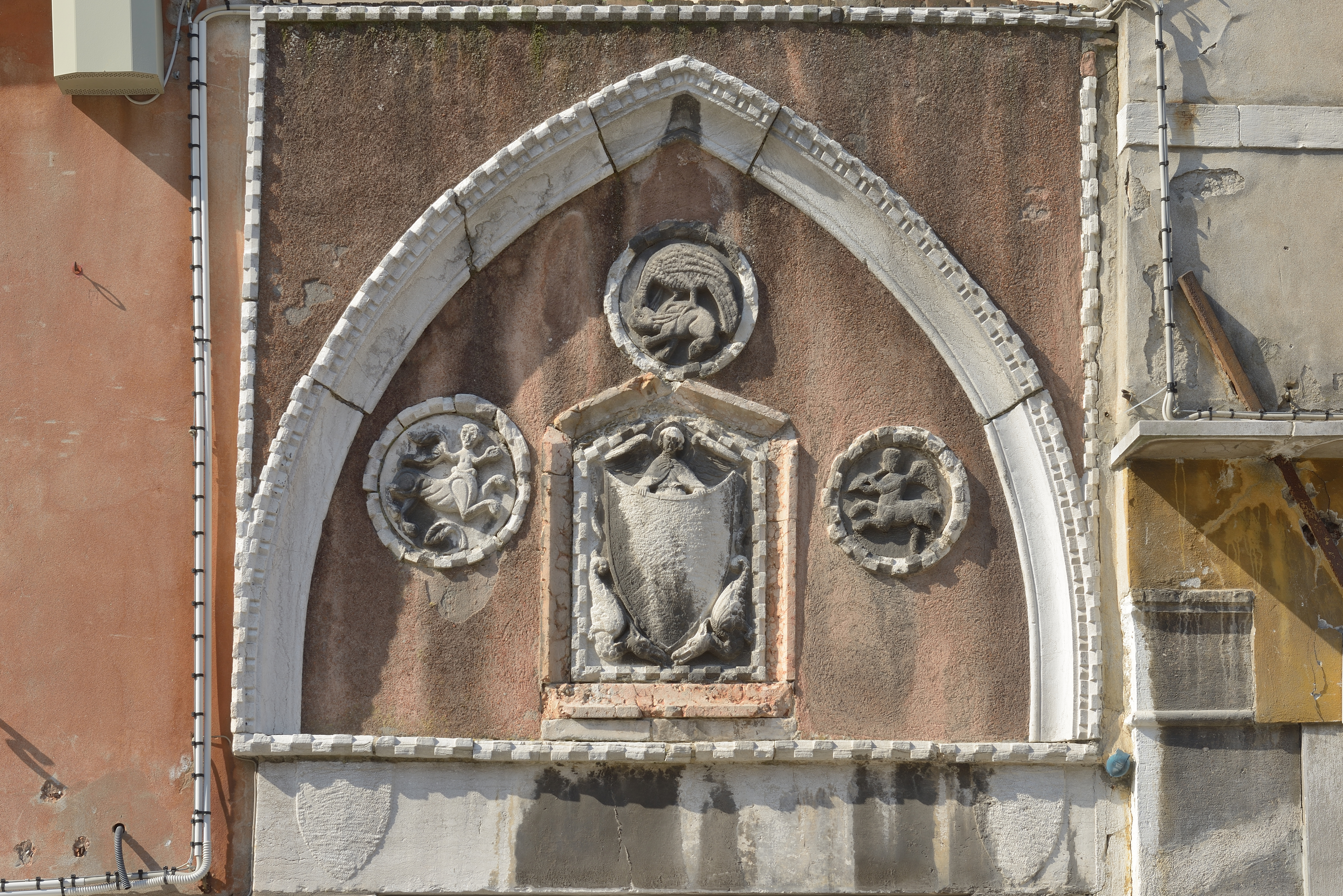
Gothic arch with paterae on a doorway on Strada Nuova in Venice

In architecture, patera (pl. paterae) is an ornamental circular or elliptical bas-relief disc. The patera is usually used to decorate friezes and walls, and to interrupt moldings. Patera is also used in furniture-making. It can be carved, incised, inlaid, or even painted.

== Overview ==
The patera is found in the ancient Roman architecture and in almost all later western styles of architecture. The patera is used both within the civil and church architecture is usually made of marble or Istrian stone. It has a variable diameter between 20 and 80 cm, while the thickness is around 10 cm. The subject represented in the bas-relief is generally of floral or animal type, but there are also figures symbolizing trades or people. Being mainly a decorative element, the patera may also perform an apotropaic function to keep away evil spirits.

== Gallery ==
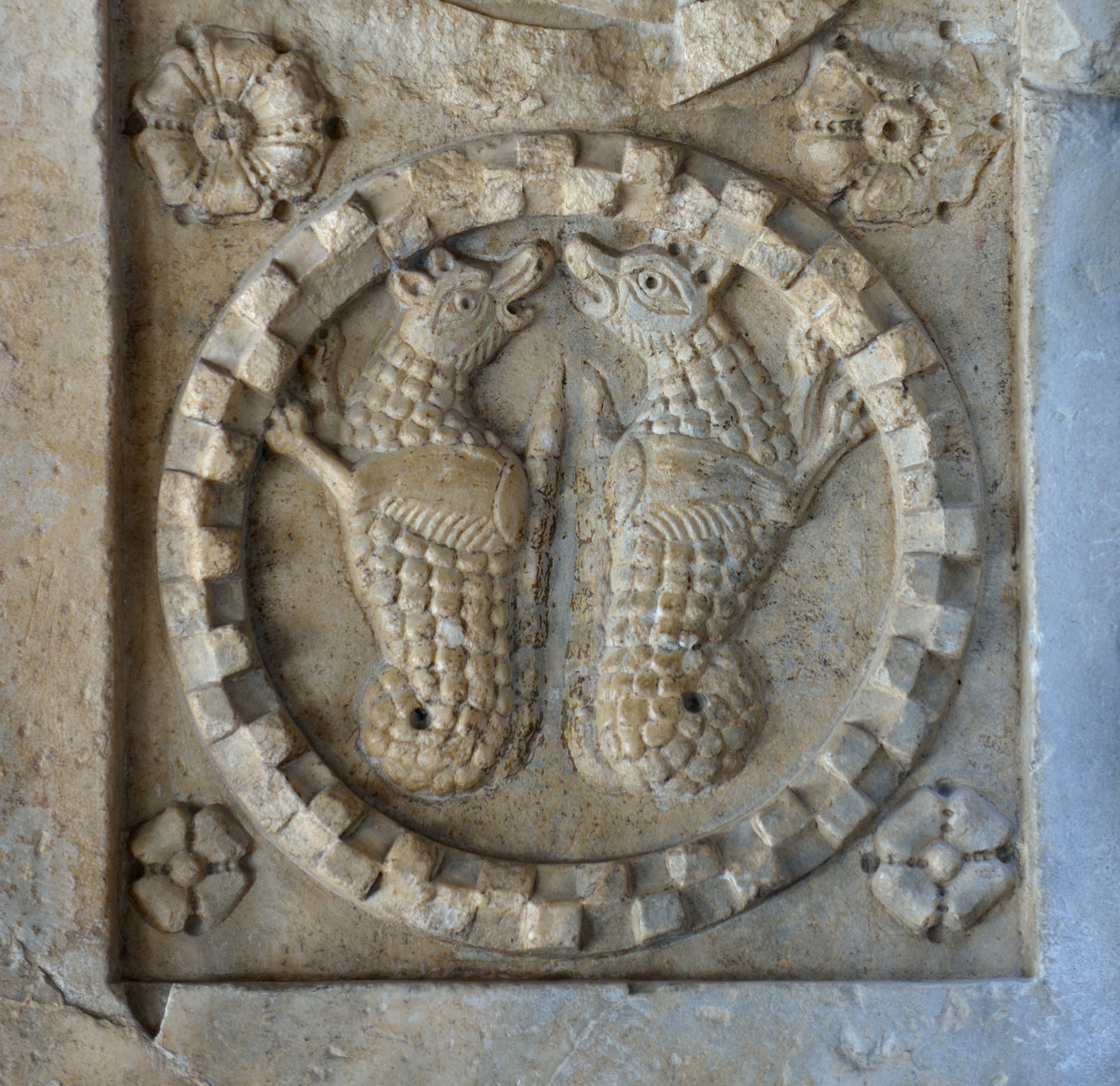
Patera in the Corte seconda del Milion court and the romanesque archway Sotoportego del Teatro in Venice.

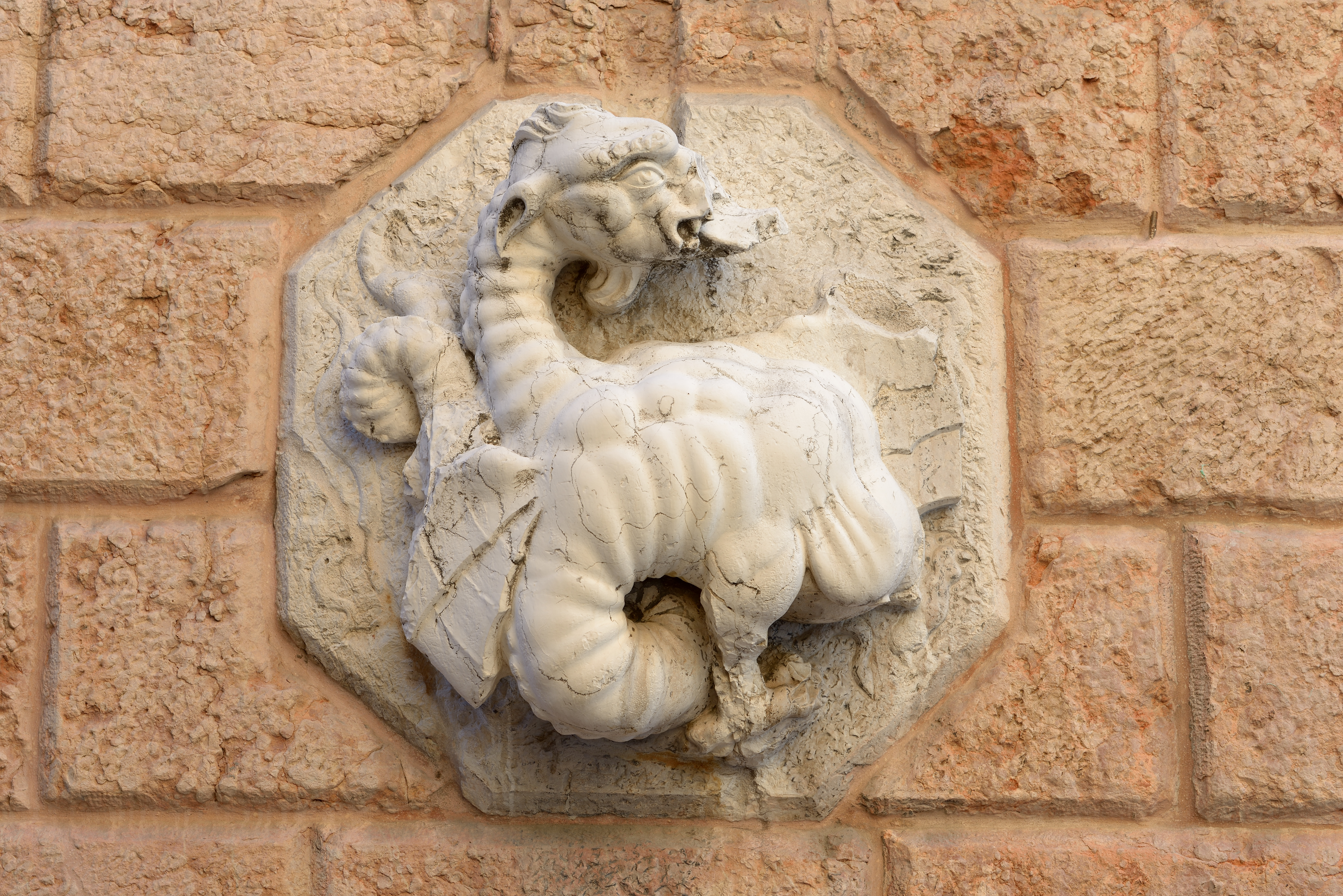
Detail of the church Santa Margherita in Venice.

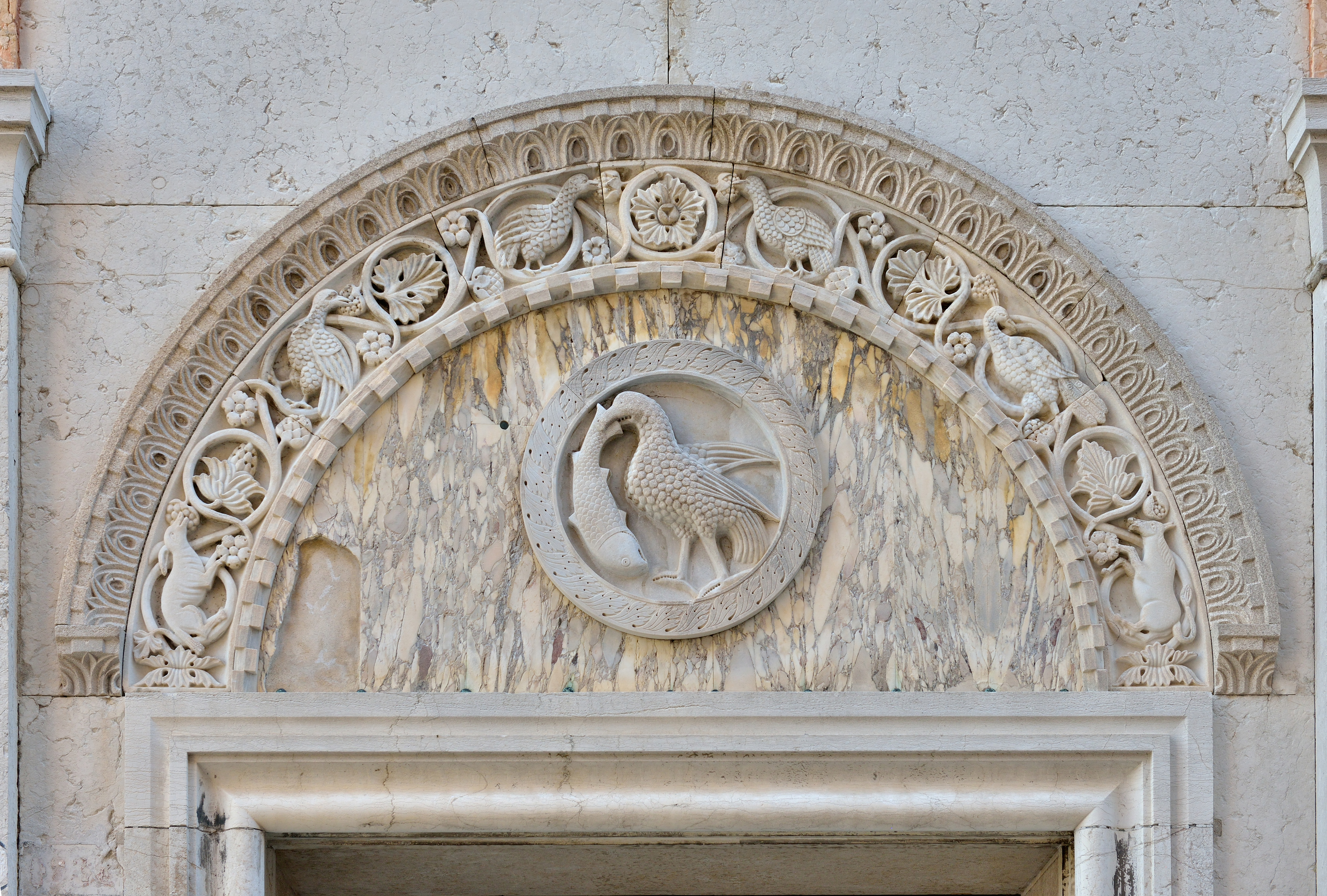
Lunette above the entrance to the Fondaco dei Turchi reconstructed in neobyzantine stile by Federico Berchet AD 1869 in Venice.

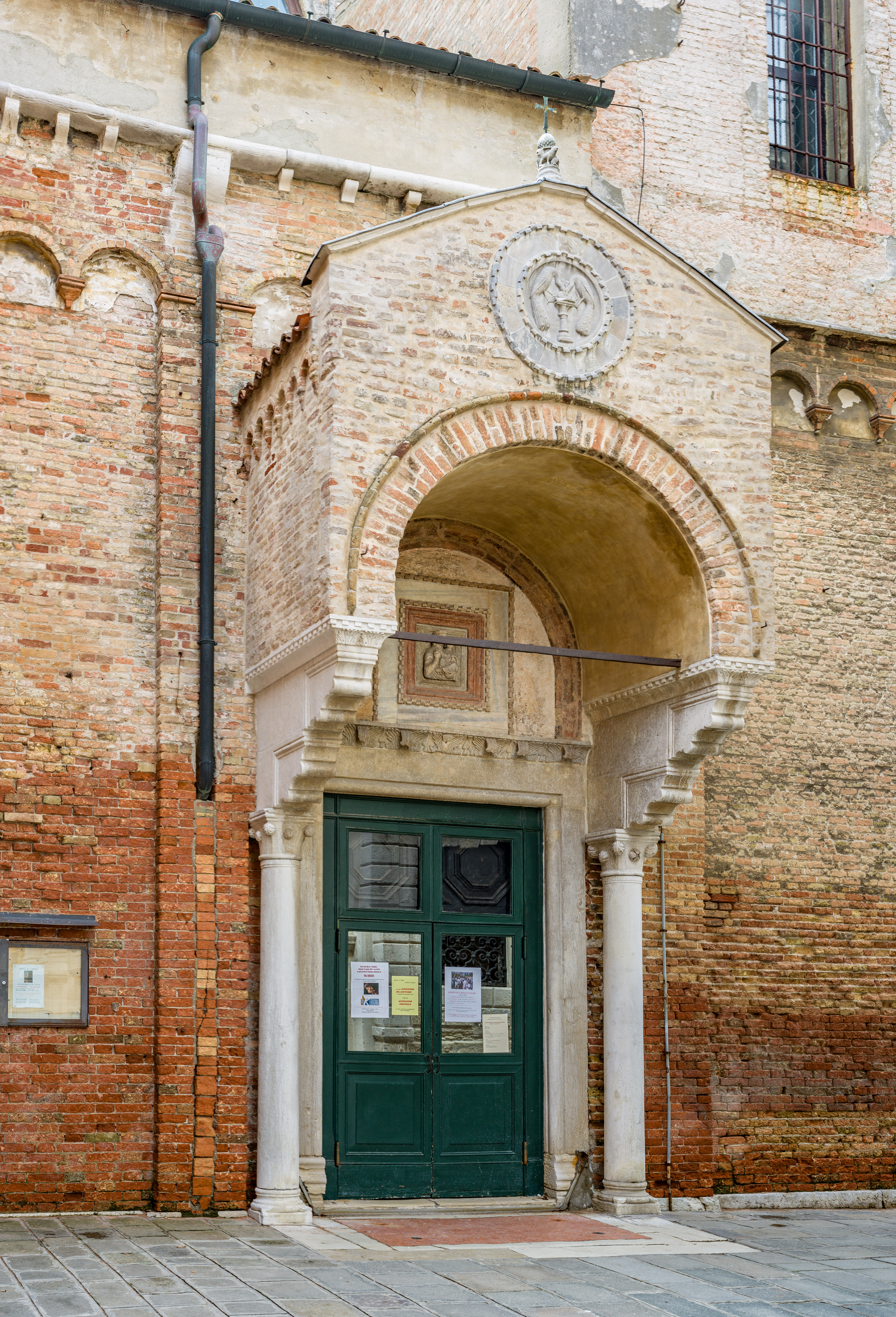
Entrance to the Carmini church in Venice.

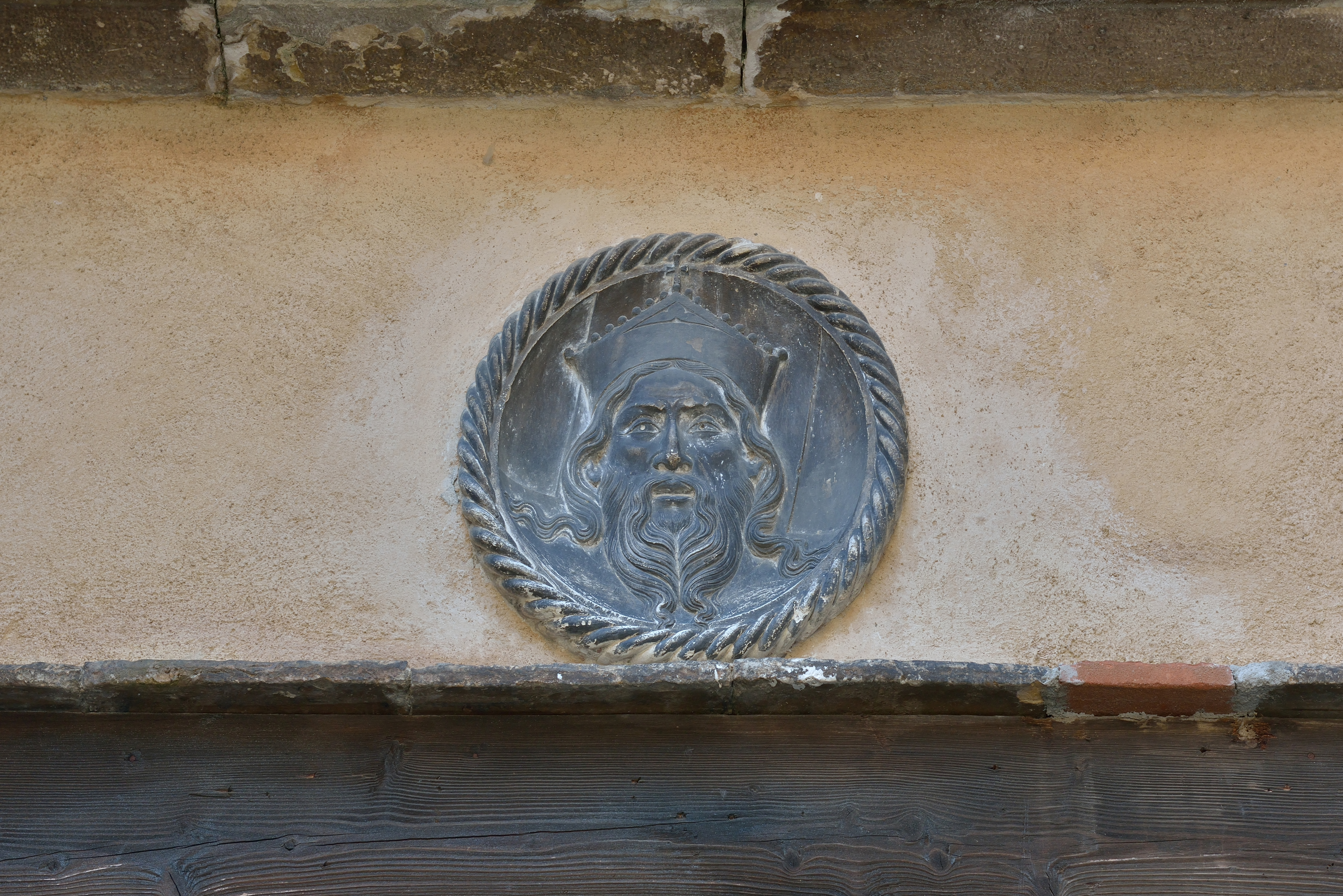
Volto Santo on the Strada Nuova in Cannaregio Venice.
