= J. S. Crowther =

English architect (1820–1893)

Joseph Stretch Crowther
- Born: c. 1820; Coventry, Warwickshire, England
- Died: March 1893 (aged 72–73); Essex, England
- Occupation: Architect

Joseph Stretch Crowther (1820 – March 1893) (usually known as J. S. Crowther) was an English architect who practised in Manchester. His buildings are mainly located in Manchester, Cheshire and Cumbria.

== Life and career ==
Crowther studied under Richard Tattersall from 1838 to 1843. He then worked as a managing clerk for Henry Bowman until 1846, when Bowman took him into partnership, the firm being known as Bowman and Crowther. Crowther, like Bowman, were both elected to membership of the Manchester Literary and Philosophical Society, Crowther on 25 January 1849. In 1845 Bowman and Crowther published a book titled Churches of the Middle Ages (with a second edition in 1853). A reviewer for The Ecclesiologist praised it for its "accurate illustrations of some of the finest examples of our old churches". The partnership started by designing churches for the Unitarians, including chapels at Hyde, Cheshire, and in Leeds, Yorkshire. The authors of the Buildings of England series consider that the best of these was at Bury, built in 1852, but since demolished.

When Crowther established his own practice, his earlier works were in the Gothic Revival manner of George Gilbert Scott. His first independent work was the church of St Philip, Alderley Edge (1851–1852). He moved to live in Alderley Edge, where he built a house for himself, Redclyffe Grange. The Buildings of England authors consider that Crowther's best churches of this period were St Mary, Hulme (1853–1858), St Alban, Cheetwood (1857–1864, since demolished), and St Mary, Bury. He later incorporated Perpendicular features in his designs, for example in St Chad, Rochdale (1884–85) where he added a chancel and chapels, and Holy Trinity, Littleborough (1889) where he added the chancel. The Buildings of England authors consider that Crowther's "most creative" church was St Benedict's, Ardwick (1877–1880) with large high-set windows, an Italianate tower, and an attached clergy house.

As well as churches, Crowther took the opportunity of designing villas in varying styles for the more wealthy people to move from the industrial cities to more attractive places such as Alderley Edge, although apart from his own house, Redclyffe Grange, most of his commissions in this town have been demolished. Further afield, in what is now Cumbria, he designed country houses such as Holehird in Troutbeck (1854), Wynlass Beck in Windermere (1854), and Parkside in Kendal (1865). He also designed a school for his home town of Alderley Edge.

Crowther was appointed as the diocesan architect for Manchester Cathedral. His restoration of the cathedral is considered by the Buildings of England authors as "his final great work", which was incomplete at the time of his death.

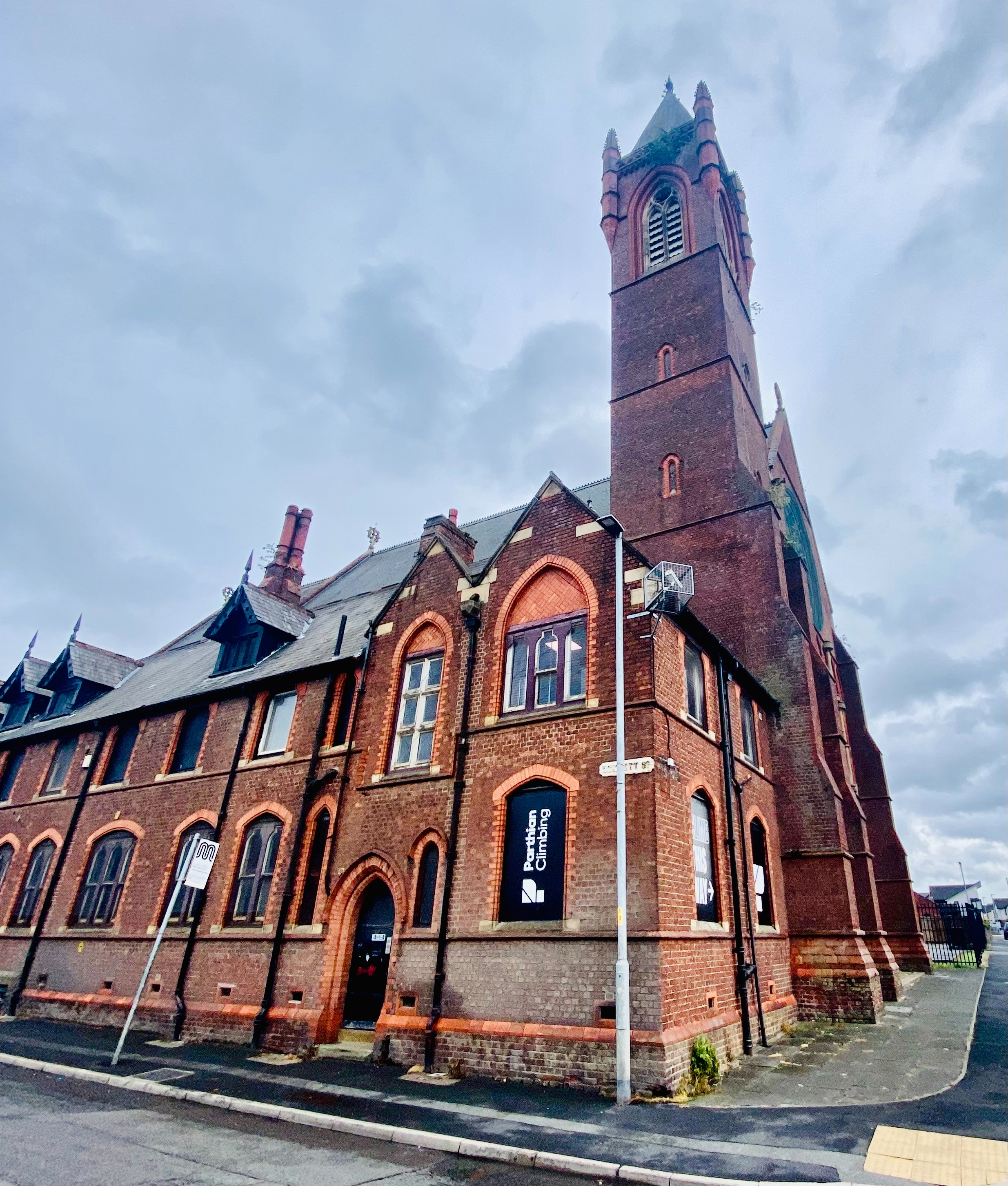
Church of St Benedict, Ardwick

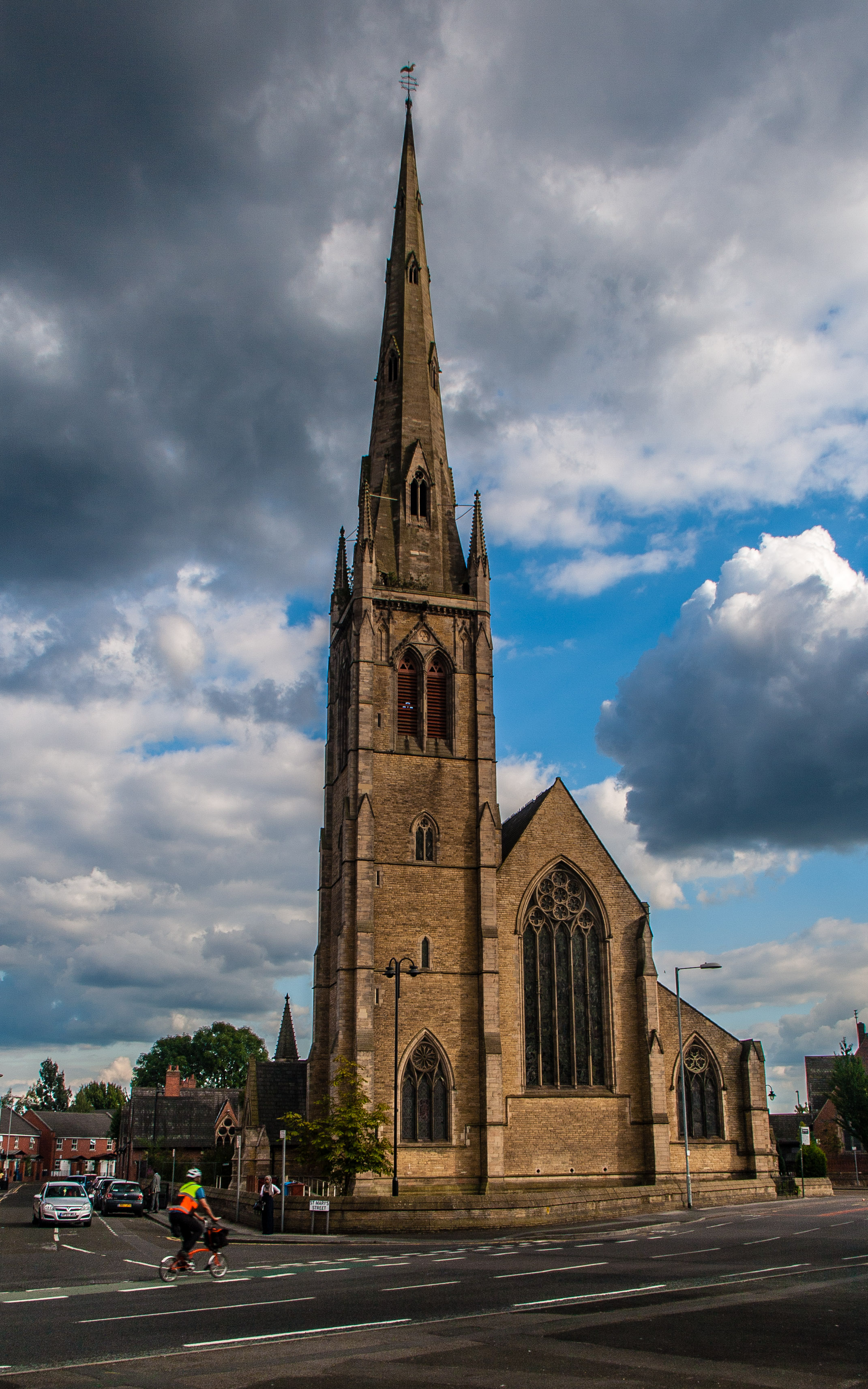
Church of St Mary, Hulme

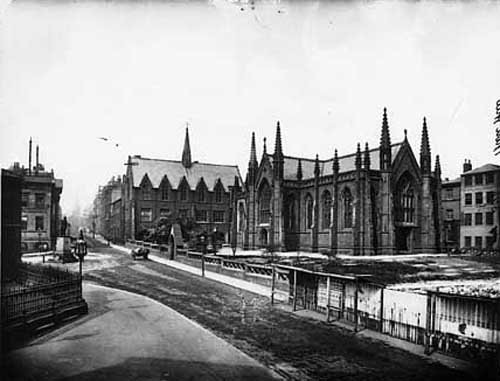
Mill Hill Unitarian Chapel, Leeds

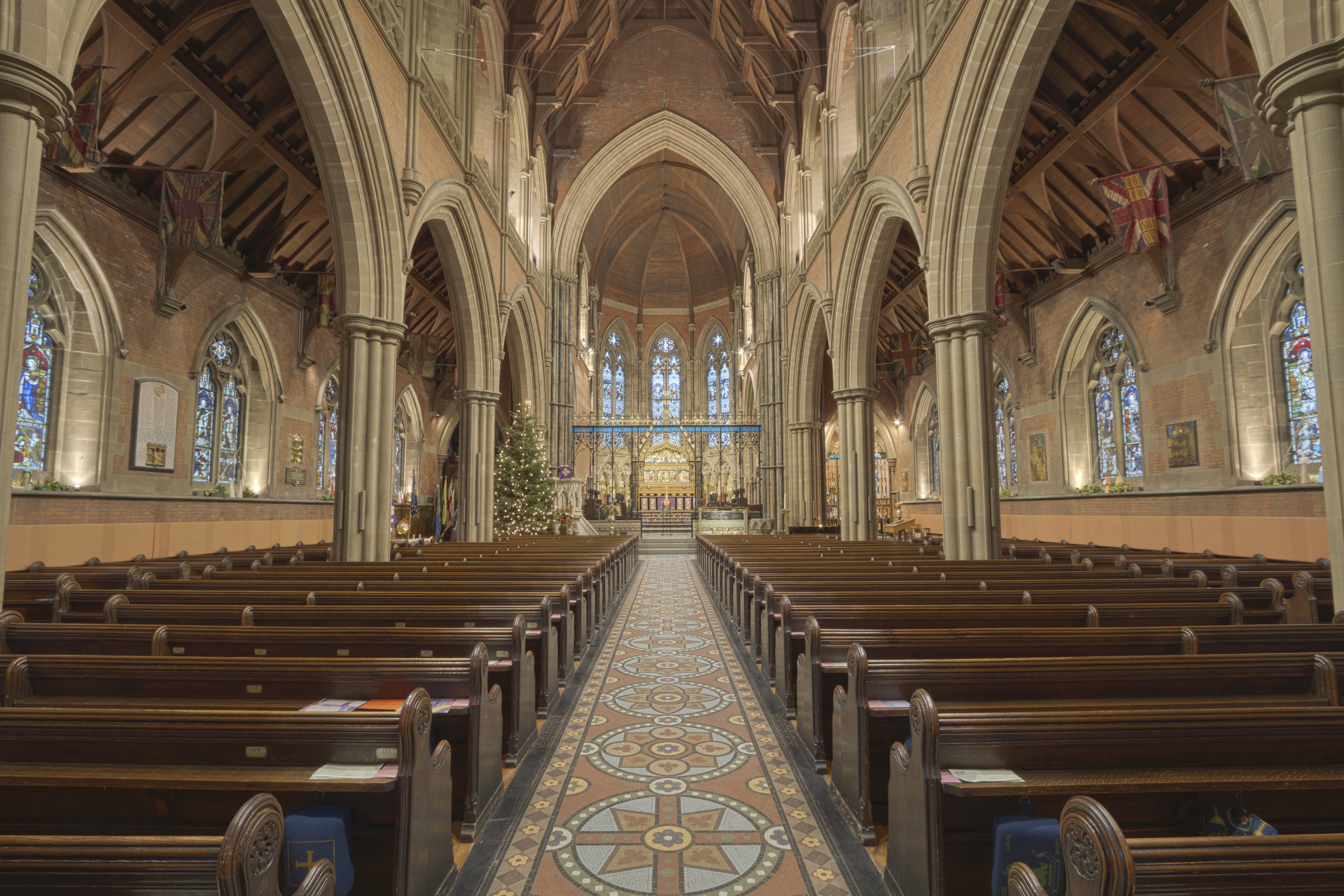
Bury Parish Church

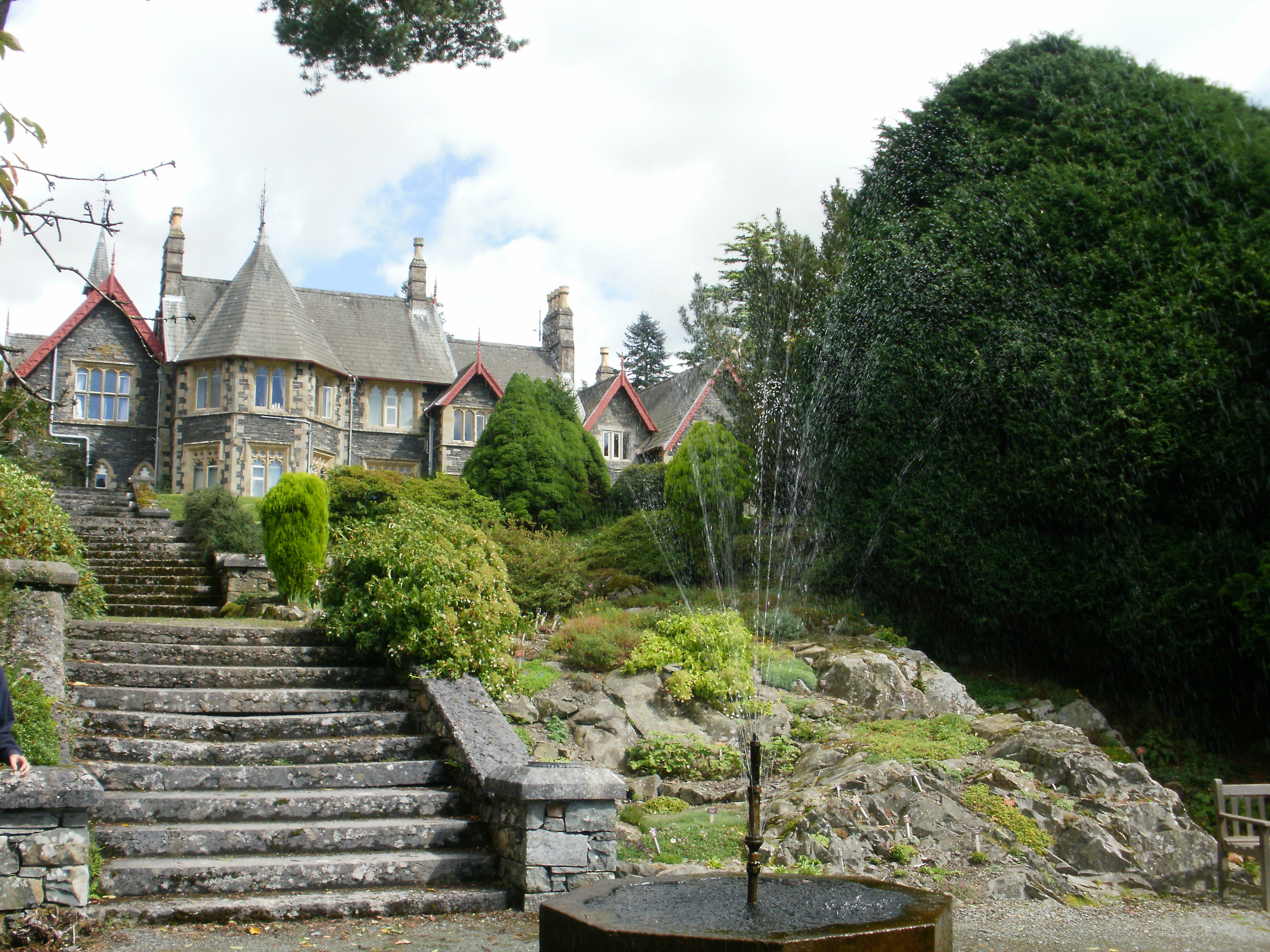
Holehird House, Cumbria

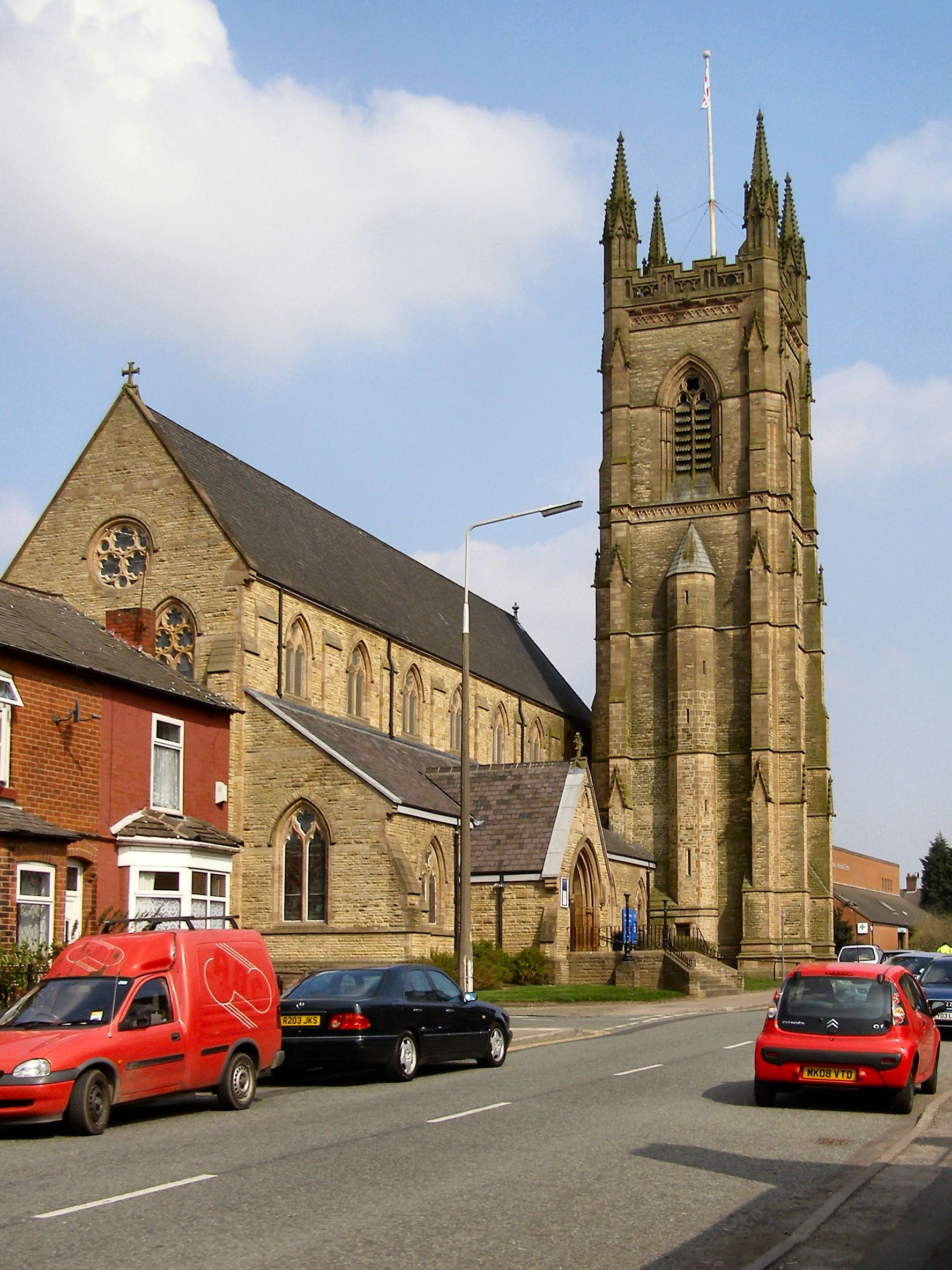
Church of St Andrew, Eccles

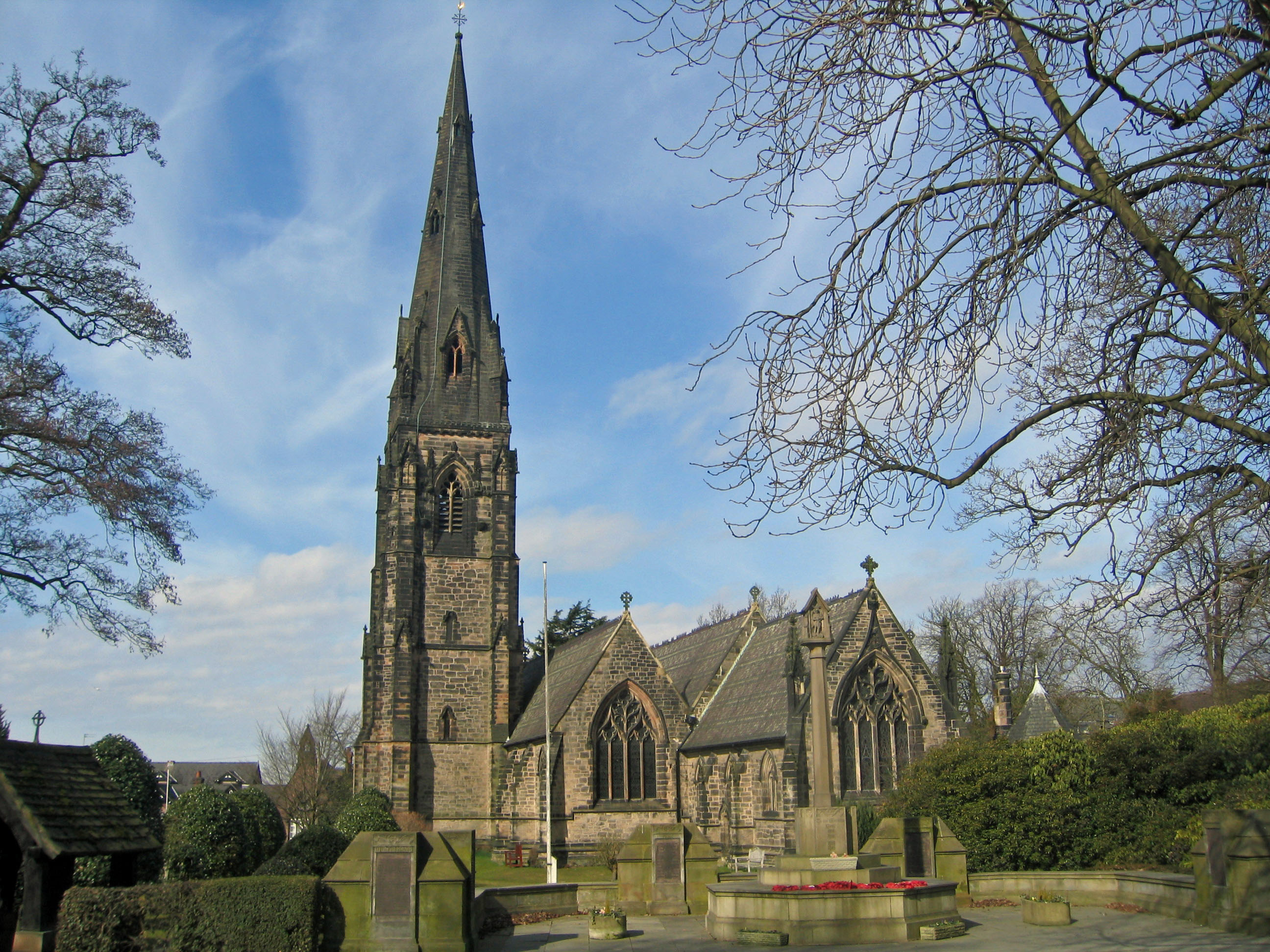
St Philip's Church, Alderley Edge

== Personal life and death ==
Crowther married a fisherman's daughter, Richanda Barber (from Pakefield, Suffolk, and 48 years his junior) in 1891 in Stanford-le-Hope, Essex. The marriage had no issue.

Crowther died on 24 March 1893 in a nursing home in Southport. His widow remarried three years after his death, and died in 1929 in Lowestoft, having spent the rest of her life in Suffolk.

== Bibliography ==
- Crowther, J. S.; Bowman, Henry (1845). The Churches of the Middle Ages: Being Select Specimens of Early and Middle Pointed Structures with a Few of the Purest Late Pointed Examples. London: George Bell. OCLC 154133727.
- Renaud, Frank, ed. (1893). An Architectural History of the Cathedral Church of Manchester Dedicated to St Mary, St. George, and St. Denys: With Illustrations by J.S. Crowther. Manchester: J. E. Cornish. OCLC 156169688.

== See also ==
- List of works by J. S. Crowther
