= Religion in the United Kingdom =

Religion in United Kingdom (2021–2022 census)
1. Christian (46.5%)
2. No religion (37.8%)
3. Muslim (5.97%)
4. Hindu (1.59%)
5. Sikh (0.79%)
6. Buddhist (0.43%)
7. Jewish (0.41%)
8. Other religions (0.58%)
9. Not stated (5.91%)

Christianity is the largest religion in the United Kingdom, though it no longer represents a majority of the population. The United Kingdom was historically a Christian-majority country, but Christianity lost its majority status between 2010 and 2020.

In the most recent 2021–2022 censuses, Christianity was the largest religion in the United Kingdom (at 46.5% of the population), followed by no religion (37.8%), Islam (6.0%), Hinduism (1.6%), Sikhism (0.8%), Buddhism (0.4%), Judaism (0.4%), Other (0.6%) and a further 5.9% who did not state a religion. Among Christians, Anglicanism is the most common denomination, with 53% of Christian believers in the UK identifying with it as of 2023, followed by Catholicism, Presbyterianism, Methodism, Unitarianism, and Baptists.

The Anglican Church of England is the state church of England, whilst the Presbyterian Church of Scotland is the national church of Scotland. The Monarch of the United Kingdom is the supreme governor of the Church of England. Both Northern Ireland and Wales have no state religion since the Irish Church Act 1869 and the Welsh Church Act 1914, respectively.

A large number of individuals have no religious affiliation, and many others are only nominally "affiliated", defined as persons claimed by a faith (e.g. through baptism for Christians), and neither believe nor practice.

== Background ==
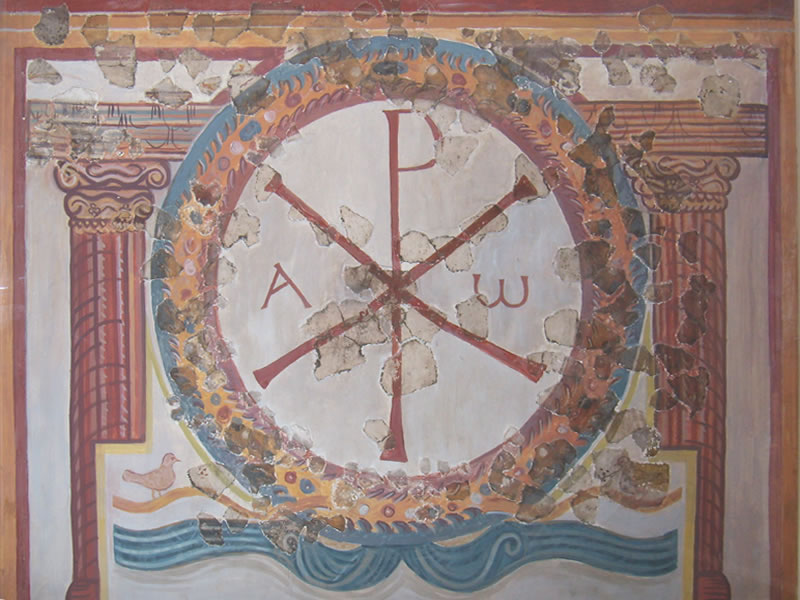
Fourth-century Chi-Rho fresco from Lullingstone Roman Villa, Kent, which contains the only known Christian paintings from the Roman era in Britain

Before the Roman conquest of Britain, various types of British paganism were practised which included ancestor worship. The history of Christianity in Britain begins at the latest in the 3rd century, when groups such as tradesmen, immigrants and soldiers introduced it to Roman Britain. Christianity seems to have stayed a minority religion throughout the 4th century, with evidence supporting the continuation of the Romano-Celtic religion during this time, and in the early 5th century there are records of British bishops asking for help from Gaul to deal with Pelagianism.

During the Anglo-Saxon settlement of Britain in the 5th and 6th centuries, Anglo-Saxon forms of Germanic paganism were introduced which became the dominant religion in the Anglo-Saxon kingdoms. While Bede stated that Christianity was completely absent from these areas, evidence suggests the continuation of small communities. The process of Christianisation of Anglo-Saxon England began in the late 6th century with the Gregorian mission, which was later followed by the Hiberno-Scottish mission. The kings in England converted over the course of the 7th century, with Æthelberht being the first to adopt the new religion around 600 whilst Arwald of Wihtwara died as the last heathen Anglo-Saxon king during an invasion in 686 by Cædwalla of Wessex. Nordic forms of Germanic paganism closely related to the Anglo-Saxon traditional religion were introduced to regions of the British Isles in the 9th and 10th centuries by Scandinavian settlers who established the Kingdom of the Isles and the Danelaw. It is generally thought that the settlers in England converted within several generations, with Erik Bloodaxe, the last potentially heathen king in England, dying in 954, however it was adopted more slowly in other parts of the region. Orkney, for example, was not nominally Christianised until around 995 when, according to Orkneyinga Saga, Olaf Tryggvason ordered that if the earl and his subjects did not convert, he would be killed and the islands ravaged. Some practices conceived of as heathen such as the worship of heathen gods and the leaving of offerings at trees, were made illegal in law codes in England beginning in the 640 and continuing into the 11th century, with punishments ranging from fines to execution. Other aspects of the pre-Christian culture blended with the incoming customs, however, such as the usage of Germanic words to refer to Christian concepts such as "god", "heaven" and "hell", and the belief in beings such as dwarfs and elves, which continued into the modern period.

Insular Christianity as it stood between the 6th and 8th centuries retained some idiosyncrasies in terms of liturgy and calendar, but it had been nominally united with Roman Christianity since at least the Synod of Whitby of 664. Still in the Anglo-Saxon period, the archbishops of Canterbury established a tradition of receiving their pallium from Rome to symbolise the authority of the pope.

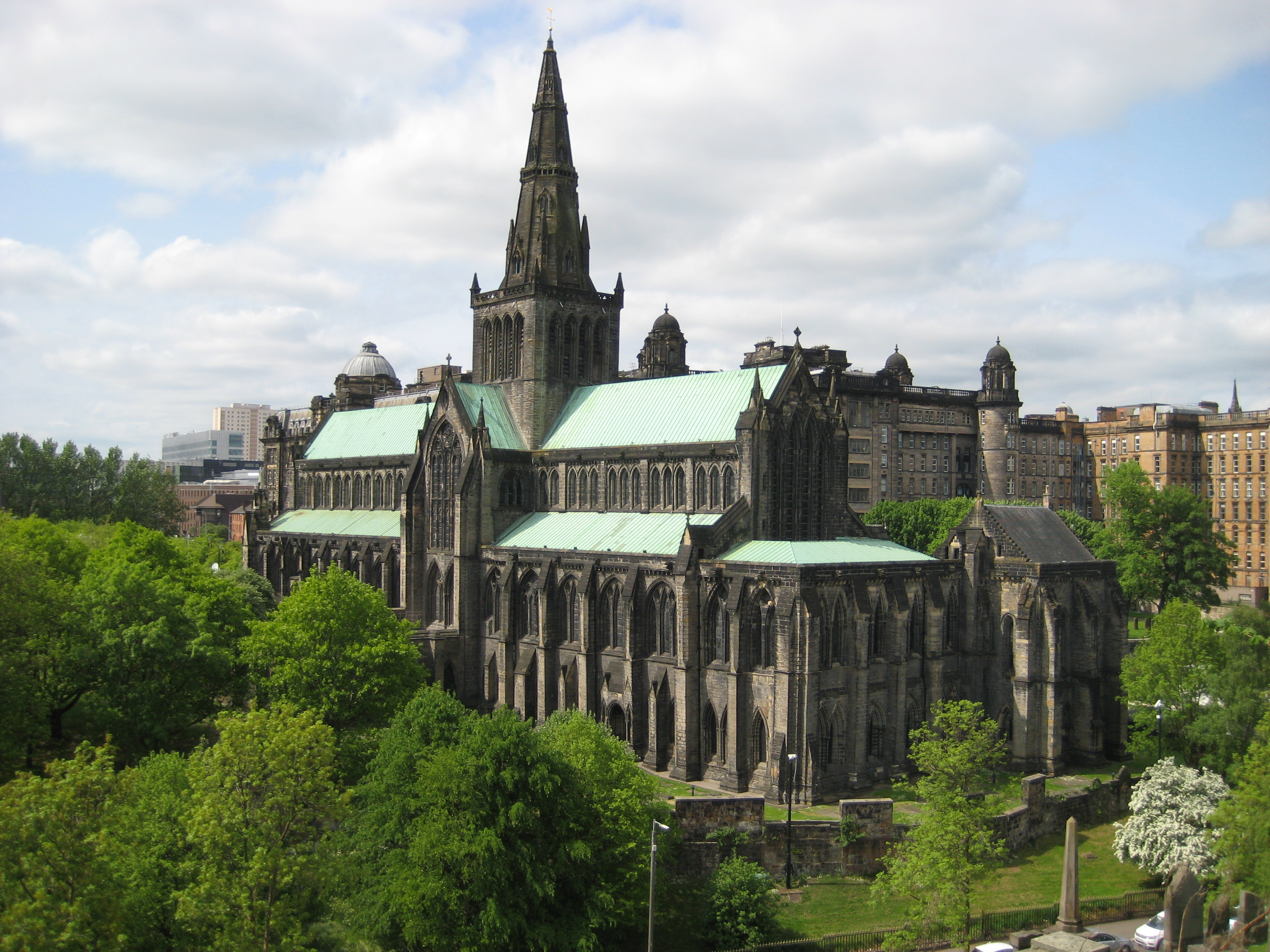
Glasgow Cathedral, a parish church of the Church of Scotland, the national church of Scotland

The Catholic Church remained the dominant form of Western Christianity in Britain throughout the Middle Ages, but the (Anglican) Church of England became the independent established church in England and Wales in 1534 as a result of the English Reformation. It retains a representation in the UK Parliament and the British monarch is its supreme governor.

Jews in England, having been expelled in 1290, were readmitted in the 1650s.

In Scotland, the Presbyterian Church of Scotland, established in a separate Scottish Reformation in the sixteenth century, is recognised as the national church. It is not subject to state control and the British monarch is an ordinary member, required to swear an oath to "maintain and preserve the Protestant Religion and Presbyterian Church Government" upon accession.

== History ==
At the formation of the UK, the development of Protestant nonconformity, including Congregationalists, Baptists, Quakers and, later, Methodists, was already underway and growing outside of the established church. The (Anglican) Church in Wales was disestablished in 1920 and, as the (Anglican) Church of Ireland was disestablished in 1870 before the partition of Ireland, there is no established church in Northern Ireland.

The adherence to the Catholic Church continued at various levels in different parts of Britain, especially among recusants and in the north of England, but most strongly in Ireland. This would expand in Great Britain, partly due to Irish immigration in the nineteenth century, the Catholic emancipation and the Restoration of the English hierarchy.

emancipated in the 19th century. British Jews had numbered fewer than 10,000 in 1800 but around 120,000 after 1881 when Russian Jews settled permanently in Britain.[36]

=== 20th–21st centuries: Secularisation and multiculturalism ===
The substantial immigration to the United Kingdom after World War II has contributed to the growth of foreign faiths, especially of Islam, Hinduism and Sikhism. Buddhism in the United Kingdom experienced growth partly due to immigration and partly due to conversion (especially when including Secular Buddhism).

As elsewhere in the Western world, religious demographics have become part of the discourse on multiculturalism, with Britain variously described as a post-Christian society, as "multi-faith", or as secularised. Scholars have suggested multiple possible reasons for the decline, but have not agreed on their relative importance. Martin Wellings lays out the "classical model" of secularisation, while noting that it has been challenged by some scholars.

The familiar starting-point, a classical model of secularisation, argues that religious faith becomes less plausible and religious practice more difficult in advanced industrial and urbanised societies. The breakdown or disruption of traditional communities and norms of behaviour; the spread of a scientific world-view diminishing the scope of the supernatural and the role of God; increasing material affluence promoting self-reliance and this-worldly optimism; and greater awareness and toleration of different creeds and ideas, encouraging religious pluralism and eviscerating commitment to a particular faith, all form components of the case for secularisation. Applied to the British churches in general by Steve Bruce and to Methodism in particular by Robert Currie, this model traces decline back to the Victorian era and charts in the twentieth century "a steady ebbing of the sea of faith".

Since 2018 the United Kingdom has been classified by some as a secularised, post-Christian society that is predominantly irreligious. Surveys since 2018 have indicated that a large majority of Britons do not believe in God, an afterlife, or regularly attend religious services. Since 2019 most surveys have also pointed to agnosticism, nontheism, or atheistic beliefs being shared by a majority of Britons. A 2020 YouGov poll found that 27% of Britions believed in a "a god" and 16% believed in another form of higher power.

== Statistics ==
=== Religious affiliations ===
Religion in England and Wales (2021 census)
1. Christian (46.2%)
2. No religion (37.2%)
3. Muslim (6.50%)
4. Hindu (1.70%)
5. Sikh (0.90%)
6. Buddhist (0.50%)
7. Jewish (0.50%)
8. Other religions (0.60%)
9. Not stated (5.99%)
Religion in Scotland (2022 census for Scotland)
1. No religion (51.1%)
2. Church of Scotland (20.4%)
3. Catholic Church (13.3%)
4. Other Christian (5.10%)
5. Muslim (2.20%)
6. Hindu (0.60%)
7. Paganism (0.40%)
8. Buddhist (0.30%)
9. Sikh (0.20%)
10. Jewish (0.10%)
11. Other religions (0.20%)
12. Not stated (6.20%)
Religion in Northern Ireland - 2021
1. Catholic Church (42.3%)
2. No religion (17.4%)
3. Presbyterian Church in Ireland (16.6%)
4. Church of Ireland (Anglican) (11.5%)
5. Methodist Church in Ireland (2.40%)
6. Other Christian (6.90%)
7. Not stated (1.50%)
8. Other religion (1.30%)

In the 2021–22 census, Christianity was the largest religion (at 46.5% of the population), followed by no religion (37.8%), Islam (6.0%), and a further 5.9% who did not state a religion.

The 2021 Census for England and Wales showed that Christianity accounts for 46.2%, followed by the Irreligion/non-religious (37.2%), Islam (6.5%), Hinduism (1.7%), Sikhism (0.9%), Buddhism (0.5%), Judaism (0.5%), and others (0.6%). Results for the 2022 census in Scotland indicated that the majority (51%) had no religion, while 38.8% of the Scottish population identified as Christian (of which 20% identified with the Church of Scotland and 13% with the Catholic Church). In Northern Ireland, Christianity is the largest religion (79.7%) followed by non-religious (17.4%), other religions (1.3%), and not stated (1.5%), as of 2021.

Although there was no UK-wide data in the 2001 or the 2011 census on adherence to individual Christian denominations, since they are asked only in the Scottish and in the Northern Irish Censuses, using the same principle as applied in the 2001 census, a survey carried out in the end of 2008 by Ipsos MORI and based on a scientifically robust sample, found the population of England and Wales to be 47.0% Anglican, 9.6% Catholic and 8.7% other Christians; 4.8% were Muslim, 3.4% were members of other religions. 5.3% were Agnostics, 6.8% were Atheists and 15.0% were not sure about their religious affiliation or refused to answer to the question.

The 2009 British Social Attitudes Survey, which covers Great Britain but not Northern Ireland, indicated that over 50 per cent would self-classify as not religious at all, 19.9 per cent were part of the Church of England, 9.3% non-denominational Christian, 8.6% Catholic, 2.2% Presbyterian/Church of Scotland, 1.3% Methodist, 0.53% Baptist, 1.17% other Protestant, 0.23% United Reformed Church/Congregational, 0.06% Free Presbyterian, 0.03% Brethren Christian and 0.41% other Christian.

In a 2016 survey conducted by BSA (British Social Attitudes) on religious affiliation; 53% of respondents indicated 'no religion' and 41% indicated they were Christians, while 6% affiliated with non-Christian religions (Islam, Hinduism, Judaism etc.)

Eurostat's Eurobarometer survey in December 2018 found that 53.6% of UK's population is Christian, while 6.2% belong to other religions and 40.2% are atheists (30.3% Agnostics, 9.9% Anti-theists). The May 2019 Special Eurobarometer found that 50% were Christians (14% Protestants, 13% Catholics, 7% Orthodox and 16% other Christians), 37% atheist (9% anti-theists, 28% 'nonbelievers and agnostics'), 5% Muslims (3% Sunnis, 1% Shias, 1% other Muslims), 1% Sikhs, 1% Hindus, fewer than 1% Jews, fewer than 1% Buddhists, 4% other religions, 1% didn't know, and 1% refused to answer. The same year Pew Research center estimated that 73% of people in the UK were Christian while 23% were unaffiliated and 4% had another religion or did not know.

The wording of the question affects the outcome of polls as is apparent when comparing the results of the Scottish census with that of the English and Welsh census. An ICM poll for The Guardian in 2006 asked the question "Which religion do you yourself belong to?" with a response of 64% stating "Christian" and 26% stating "none". In the same survey, 63% claimed they are not religious with just 33% claiming they are. This suggests that the religious UK population identify themselves as having Christian beliefs, but maybe not as active "church-goers".

Religions other than Christianity, such as Islam, Hinduism, Sikhism and Judaism, have established a presence in the United Kingdom, both through immigration and by attracting converts. Others that have done so include the Baháʼí Faith, Modern paganism, and the Rastafari movement -which has 5000 followers in the UK as of a 2001 census.

The European Social Survey, carried out between 2014 and 2016, found that 70% of people between 16 and 29 were not religious.

=== Historical trends since 1900 ===
Religious affiliation in Great Britain over time

- Sources: Based on Historical data/information, Religious Data since 1980s, Eurobarometer 2015 Data, and 2001 & 2011 National UK Census. Specifications: Catholics include Roman Catholics (8%) and Anglo-Catholics (5%), Protestants include the majority of Anglicans (Traditional Anglicanism, Anglican Evangelical versions and part of Anglo-Catholics), Mainline Protestant Churches like Methodists or Presbyterians (7%) and Evangelical Protestants (4%), Other Christians historically were British Restoriationist Churches inspired by Mainline Protestant denominations (known as Free Churches), today the most numerous Christian minorities are the Church of Jesus Christ of Latter-day Saints (LDS Church) (0.3%), and Jehovah's Witnesses (0.2%), also including Orthodox Christianity. Non-Religious since 2000s data were an adjusted by the specified non-religious and most of the non-response per cent. Other religions: Islam in the United Kingdom, British Jews, Hinduism in the United Kingdom, Sikhism in the United Kingdom.
Share of different religions by year. View chart definition.

=== Censuses ===
The statistics for current religion (not religion of upbringing where also asked) from the 2021, 2011 and 2001 censuses are set out in the tables below.

United Kingdom Censuses 2001–2022
Religion	2001		2011		2021–22	
Religion	Number	%	Number	%	Number	%
Christianity	42,079,417	71.6	37,583,962	59.5	31,149,224	46.53
No religion	13,626,299	23.2	16,221,509	25.7	25,273,945	37.75
Religion not stated	13,626,299	23.2	4,528,323	7.2	3,960,980	5.91
Islam	1,591,126	2.7	2,786,635	4.4	3,998,875	5.97
Hinduism	558,810	1.0	835,394	1.3	1,066,894	1.59
Sikhism	336,149	0.6	432,429	0.7	535,517	0.79
Buddhism	151,816	0.3	261,584	0.4	289,551	0.43
Judaism	266,740	0.5	269,568	0.4	277,613	0.41
Other religion	178,837	0.3	262,774	0.4	388,789	0.58
Total population	58,789,194	100.0	63,182,178	100.0	66,940,560	100.0

2021–22 Census
Religion	England		Wales		England and Wales		Scotland		Great Britain		Northern Ireland		United Kingdom	
Religion	Number	%	Number	%	Number	%	Number	%	Number	%	Number	%	Number	%
Christianity	26,167,899	46.3	1,354,773	43.6	27,522,672	46.2	2,110,405	38.8	29,633,077	45.56	1,516,147	79.7	31,149,224	46.53
No religion	20,715,664	36.7	1,446,398	46.5	22,162,062	37.2	2,780,900	51.1	24,942,962	38.35	330,983	17.4	25,273,945	37.75
Islam	3,801,186	6.7	66,947	2.2	3,868,133	6.5	119,872	2.2	3,988,005	6.1	10,870	0.57	3,998,875	5.97
Religion not stated	3,400,548	6.0	195,041	6.3	3,595,589	6.0	334,862	6.2	3,930,451	6.0	30,529	1.6	3,960,980	5.91
Hinduism	1,020,533	1.8	12,242	0.4	1,032,775	1.7	29,929	0.6	1,062,704	1.6	4,190	0.22	1,066,894	1.59
Sikhism	520,092	0.9	4,048	0.1	524,140	0.9	10,988	0.2	535,128	0.8	389	0.02	535,517	0.79
Judaism	269,283	0.5	2,044	0.1	271,327	0.5	5,847	0.1	277,174	0.4	439	0.02	277,613	0.41
Buddhism	262,433	0.5	10,075	0.3	272,508	0.5	15,501	0.3	288,009	0.4	1,542	0.08	289,551	0.43
Other religion	332,410	0.6	15,926	0.5	348,334	0.6	31,538	0.5	379,872	0.5	8,917	0.5	388,789	0.58
Total population	56,490,048	100.0	3,107,494	100.0	59,597,540	100.0	5,439,842	100.0	65,037,382	100.0	1,903,178	100.0	66,940,560	100.0

2011 Census
Religion	England		Wales		England and Wales		Scotland		Great Britain		Northern Ireland		United Kingdom	
Religion	Number	%	Number	%	Number	%	Number	%	Number	%	Number	%	Number	%
Christianity	31,479,876	59.4	1,763,299	57.6	33,243,175	59.3	2,850,199	53.8	36,093,374	58.8	1,490,588	82.3	37,583,962	59.5
No religion	13,114,232	24.7	982,997	32.1	14,097,229	25.1	1,941,116	36.7	16,038,345	26.1	183,164	10.1	16,221,509	25.7
Religion not stated	3,804,104	7.2	233,928	7.6	4,038,032	7.2	368,039	7.0	4,406,071	7.2	122,252	6.8	4,528,323	7.2
Islam	2,660,116	5.0	45,950	1.5	2,706,066	4.8	76,737	1.4	2,782,803	4.5	3,832	0.21	2,786,635	4.4
Hinduism	806,199	1.5	10,434	0.34	816,633	1.5	16,379	0.3	833,012	1.4	2,382	0.13	835,394	1.3
Sikhism	420,196	0.8	2,962	0.1	423,158	0.8	9,055	0.2	432,213	0.7	216	0.01	432,429	0.7
Judaism	261,282	0.5	2,064	0.1	263,346	0.5	5,887	0.1	269,233	0.4	335	0.02	269,568	0.4
Buddhism	238,626	0.5	9,117	0.3	247,743	0.4	12,795	0.2	260,538	0.4	1,046	0.06	261,584	0.4
Other religion	227,825	0.4	12,705	0.4	240,530	0.4	15,196	0.3	255,726	0.4	7,048	0.39	262,774	0.4
Total population	53,012,456	100.0	3,063,456	100.0	56,075,912	100.0	5,295,403	100.0	61,371,315	100.0	1,810,863	100.0	63,182,178	100.0

2001 Census
Religion	England		Wales		England and Wales		Scotland		Great Britain		Northern Ireland		United Kingdom	
Religion	Number	%	Number	%	Number	%	Number	%	Number	%	Number	%	Number	%
Christianity	35,251,244	71.7	2,087,242	71.9	37,338,486	71.8	3,294,545	65.1	40,633,031	71.2	1,446,386	85.8	42,079,417	71.6
No religion	7,171,332	14.6	537,935	18.5	7,709,267	14.8	1,394,460	27.6	9,103,727	15.9	233,853	13.9	13,626,299	23.2
Religion not stated	3,776,515	7.7	234,143	8.1	4,010,658	7.7	278,061	5.5	4,288,719	7.5	233,853	13.9	13,626,299	23.2
Islam	1,524,887	3.1	21,739	0.7	1,546,626	3.0	42,557	0.8	1,589,183	2.8	1,943	0.12	1,591,126	2.7
Hinduism	546,982	1.1	5,439	0.2	552,421	1.1	5,564	0.1	557,985	1.0	825	0.05	558,810	1.0
Sikhism	327,343	0.7	2,015	0.1	329,358	0.6	6,572	0.1	335,930	0.6	219	0.0	336,149	0.6
Judaism	257,671	0.5	2,256	0.1	259,927	0.5	6,448	0.1	266,375	0.5	365	0.0	266,740	0.5
Buddhism	139,046	0.3	5,407	0.2	144,453	0.3	6,830	0.1	151,283	0.3	533	0.0	151,816	0.3
Other religion	143,811	0.3	6,909	0.2	150,720	0.3	26,974	0.5	177,694	0.3	1,143	0.1	178,837	0.3
Total population	49,138,831	100.0	2,903,085	100.0	52,041,916	100.0	5,062,011	100.0	57,103,927	100.0	1,685,267	100.0	58,789,194	100.0

Percentage of respondents in the 2011 census in the UK who said they were Christian

=== Surveys ===
Religious affiliations of UK citizens are recorded by regular surveys, the four major ones being the UK Census, the Labour Force Survey, the British Social Attitudes survey and the European Social Survey. The different questions asked by these surveys produced different results:

- The census for England and Wales asked the question "What is your religion?". In 2001 14.81% and in 2011 around a quarter (25.1%) of the population said they had "none" and 70% stated they were Christian.
- The census for Scotland asked the question "What religion, religious denomination or body do you belong to?". In 2001 27.55% and in 2011 36.7% selected "none" and 53.8% stated they were Christian.
- The Labour Force Survey asked the question "What is your religion even if you are not currently practising?" with a response of 15.7% selecting "no religion" in 2004 and 22.4% selecting "no religion" in 2010.
- The British Social Attitudes survey asked the question "Do you regard yourself as belonging to any particular religion?" with 53% selecting "no religion" in 2016.
- The European Social Survey asked the question "Which religion or denomination do you belong to at present?" with 50.54% of respondents selecting "no religion" in 2002 and 52.68% selecting "no religion" in 2008.

Other surveys:

- In 1983, in a large public opinion survey, almost a third of Britons said they believed in Hell and the Devil. In Northern Ireland, 91 per cent of people said they believed in sin. This was reported in The Observer on 28 February 1983.
- In 2018, according to a study jointly conducted by London's St Mary's University's Benedict XVI Centre for Religion and Society and the Institut Catholique de Paris, and based on data from the European Social Survey 2014–2016 collected on a sample of 560, among 16 to 29 years-old British people 21% were Christians (10% Catholic, 7% Anglican, 2% other Protestant and 2% other Christian), 6% were Muslims, 3% were of other religions, and 70% were not religious. The data was obtained from two questions, one asking "Do you consider yourself as belonging to any particular religion or denomination?" to the full sample and the other one asking "Which one?" to the sample who replied with "Yes".

Detailed 2018 BSA survey on religion in the UK
Affiliation	% of UK population
No religion	52
Christian	38
Church of England	12
Catholic	7
Presbyterian	2
Methodist	1
Baptist	0.5
Christian - no denomination	13
Other Christian	1
Non-Christian faiths	9
Muslim	6
Jewish	0.5
Other Non-Christian faiths	3
Total	100

The British Social Attitudes surveys and the European Social Surveys are fielded to adult individuals. In contrast, the United Kingdom Census and the Labour Force Surveys are household surveys; the respondent completes the questionnaire on behalf of each member of the household, including children, as well as for themselves. The 2010 Labour Force Survey claimed that 54% of children aged from birth to four years were Christian, rising to 59% for children aged between 5 and 9 and 65% for children aged between 10 and 14. The inclusion of children who are part of religious families influences the results of the polls.

Other major polls agree with the British Social Attitudes surveys and the European Social Surveys, with a YouGov survey fielded in February 2012 indicating that 43% of respondents claimed to belong to a religion and 76% claimed they were not very religious or not religious at all. An Ipsos MORI survey fielded in August 2003 indicated that 18% of respondents claimed to be "a practising member of an organised religion" and 25% claimed "I am a non-practising member of an organised religion". A 2015 study estimated some 25,000 believers in Christ from a Muslim background, most of whom belong to an evangelical or Pentecostal community.

==== Religious affiliation (%) in England, Scotland and Wales according to the Annual Population Survey 2007-2016 ====
The Annual Population Survey is a combined statistical survey of households in Great Britain which is conducted quarterly by the Office for National Statistics and combines results from the Labour Force Survey and the English, Welsh and Scottish Labour Force Survey, gathers information about the religious affiliation, reported in the table below. The change in the religious affiliation between the 2010 APS and the 2011 APS is due to a question change, which significantly influenced the final results.

=== Attendance ===
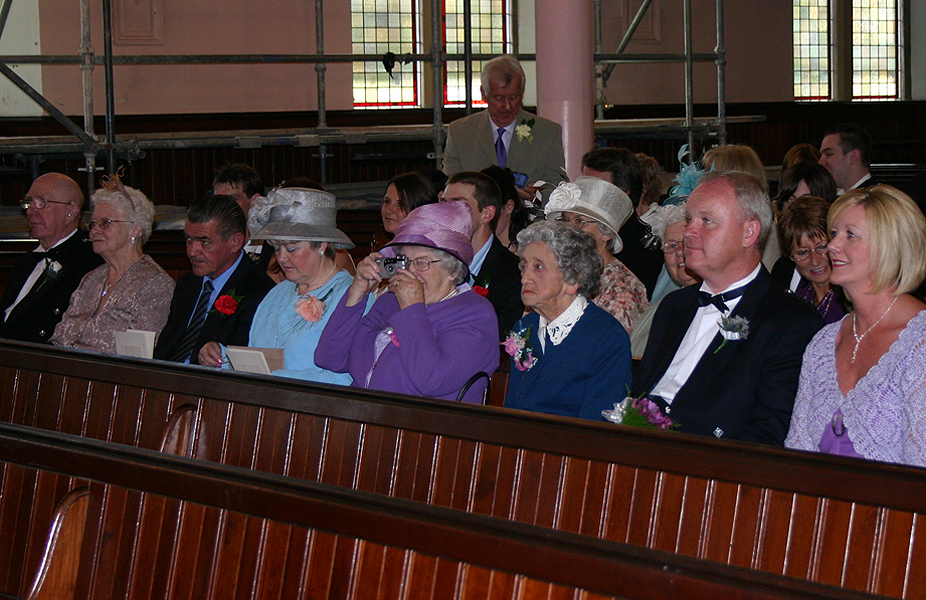
A Church of Scotland congregation

Society in the United Kingdom is markedly more secular than it was in the past and the number of churchgoers fell over the second half of the 20th century. Already in the mid-20th century, church attendance in Britain was relatively low. A Mass-Observation survey conducted in 1948 and 1949 found only 15% of Britons attended church. The English Church survey found that attendance was 12% in 1979, 10% in 1989, and 7.5% in 1998. The Ipsos MORI poll in 2003 reported that 18% were "a practising member of an organised religion". The Tearfund Survey in 2007 found that only 7% of the population considered themselves as practising Christians. Sometimes 10% attended church weekly and two-thirds had not gone to church in the past year. The Tearfund Survey also found that two-thirds of UK adults (66%) or 32.2 million people had no connection with the Church at present (nor with another religion). These people were evenly divided between those who have been in the past but have since left (16 million) and those who have never been in their lives (16.2 million).

A survey in 2002 found Christmas attendance at Anglican churches in England varied between 10.19% of the population in the diocese of Hereford, down to just 2.16% in Manchester. Church attendance at Christmas in some dioceses was up to three times the average for the rest of the year. Overall church attendance at Christmas has been steadily increasing in recent years; a 2005 poll found that 43 per cent expected to attend a church service over the Christmas period, in comparison with 39% and 33% for corresponding polls taken in 2003 and 2001 respectively.

A December 2007 report by Christian Research showed that the services of the Catholic Church had become the best-attended services of Christian denominations in England, with average attendance at Sunday Mass of 861,000, compared to 852,000 attending Anglican services. Attendance at Anglican services had declined by 20% between 2000 and 2006, while attendance at Catholic services, boosted by large-scale immigration from Poland and Lithuania, had declined by only 13%. In Scotland, attendance at Church of Scotland services declined by 19% and attendance at Catholic services fell by 25%. British Social Attitudes Surveys have shown the proportion of those in Great Britain who consider they "belong to" Christianity to have fallen from 66% in 1983 to 43% in 2009.

In 2012 about 6% of the population of the United Kingdom regularly attended church, with the average age of attendees being 51; in contrast, in 1980, 11% had regularly attended, with an average age of 37. It is predicted that by 2020 attendance will be around 4%, with an average age of 56. This decline in church attendance has forced many churches to close down across the United Kingdom, with the Church of England alone closing 1,500 churches between 1969 and 2002. Their fates include dereliction, demolition, and residential, artistic and commercial conversion. In October 2014 weekly attendance at Church of England services dropped below 1 million for the first time. At Christmas 2014, 2.4 million attended. For that year baptisms were 130,000, down 12% since 2004; marriages were 50,000, down 19%; and funerals 146,000, down 29%. The Church estimated that about 1% of churchgoers were lost to death each year; the Church's age profile suggested that attendances would continue to decline.

One study showed that in 2004 at least 930,000 Muslims attended a mosque at least once a week, just outnumbering the 916,000 regular churchgoers in the Church of England. Muslim sources claim the number of practising Muslims is underestimated as nearly all of them pray at home.

=== Belief ===
European Social Survey (UK) "Do you consider yourself as belonging to any particular religion or denomination?"
Year	Yes	No
2008	47.32%	52.64%
2006	48.45%	51.34%
2004	50.55%	49.24%
2002	49.46%	50.49%
Source: European social survey 2002–2010

There is a disparity between the figures for those identifying themselves with a particular religion and for those proclaiming a belief in a god:

- In a 2011 YouGov poll, 34% of UK citizens said they believed in a god or gods.
- A Eurobarometer opinion poll in 2010 reported that 37% of UK citizens "believed there is a god", 33% believe there is "some sort of spirit or life force" and 25% answered "I don't believe there is any sort of spirit, god or life force".
- The 2008 European Social Survey suggested that 46.94% of UK citizens never prayed and 18.96% prayed daily.
- A survey in 2007 suggested that 42% of adults resident in the United Kingdom prayed, with one in six praying daily.

=== Jedi census phenomenon ===
In the 2001 census, 390,127 individuals (0.7 per cent of total respondents) in England and Wales self-identified as followers of the Jedi faith. This Jedi census phenomenon followed an internet campaign that claimed, incorrectly, that the Jedi belief system would receive official government recognition as a religion if it received enough support in the census. An email in support of the campaign, quoted by BBC News, invited people to "do it because you love Star Wars ... or just to annoy people". The Office for National Statistics revealed the total figure in a press release entitled "390,000 Jedi there are".

== Christianity ==
Forms of Christianity have dominated religious life in what is now the United Kingdom for over 1,400 years. The United Kingdom was formed by the union of previously autonomous states in 1707, and consequently most of the largest religious groups do not have UK-wide organisational structures. While some groups have separate structures for the individual countries of the United Kingdom, others have a single structure covering England and Wales or Great Britain. Similarly, due to the relatively recent creation of Northern Ireland in 1921, most major religious groups in Northern Ireland are organised on an all-Ireland basis.

=== Protestantism ===
==== Anglicanism ====
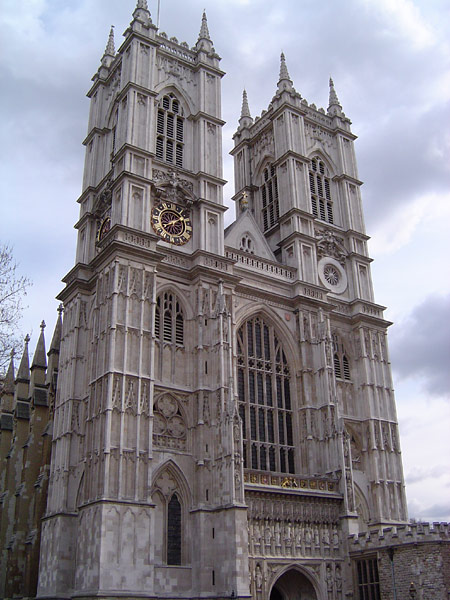
Westminster Abbey is used for the coronation of British monarchs.

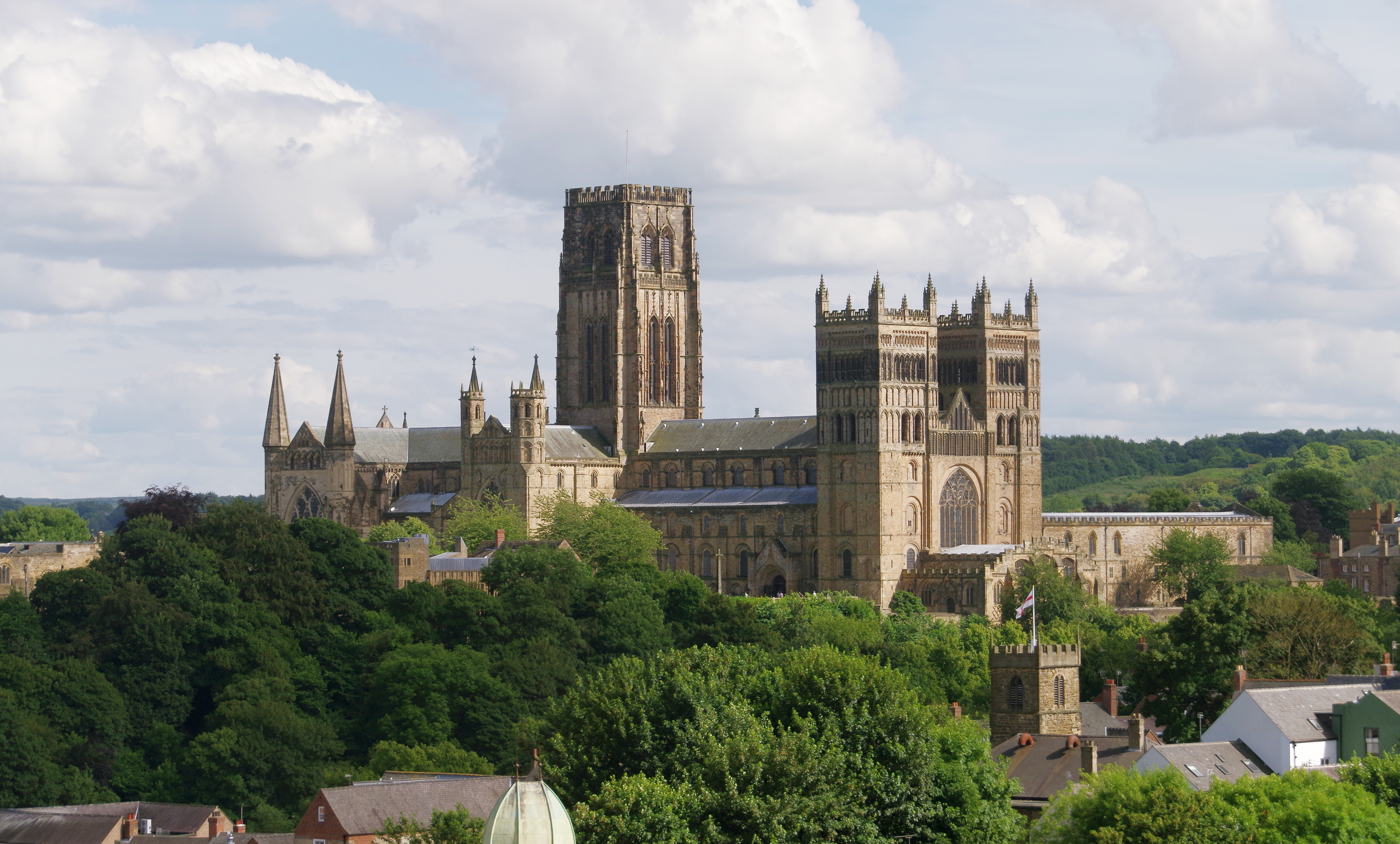
Durham Cathedral

The largest Christian denomination in the UK, as measured by baptised persons, is Anglicanism with 23.9 million baptised Anglicans. The World Christian Database, published in 2021, estimated there were 23 million baptised Anglicans in England, 1.1 million in Wales, and 250,000 in Northern Ireland. The estimate of baptised Anglicans is defined as being for "affiliated" Anglicans, meaning persons baptised in an Anglican church, not necessarily those who self-identify as Anglicans. The Church of England is the established church in England. Its most senior bishops sit in the national parliament and the Monarch is its supreme governor. It is also the "mother church" of the worldwide Anglican Communion. The Church of England separated from the Catholic Church in 1534 and became the established church by Parliament in the Act of Supremacy, beginning a series of events known as the English Reformation. Historically it has been the predominant Christian denomination in England and Wales, in terms of both influence and number of adherents.

The Church of Ireland has 219,788 members in Northern Ireland where they make up 11.6% of the population across 418 congregations.

The Scottish Episcopal Church, which is part of the Anglican Communion (but not a "daughter church" of the Church of England), dates from the final establishment of Presbyterianism in Scotland in 1690, when it split from the Church of Scotland. In the 1920s, the Church in Wales became disestablished and independent from the Church of England, but remains in the Anglican Communion.

During the years 2012 to 2014 the number of members of the Church of England dropped by around 1.7 million.

In 2018, 12% of the population of Great Britain identify as Anglicans, a sharp decline from 1983 when 40% of the population identified as Anglicans.

==== Baptists ====
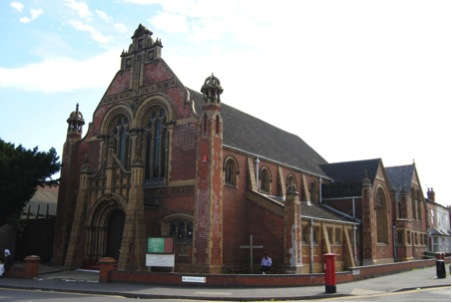
A Baptist church in Birmingham, West Midlands

The Baptist Union of Great Britain, despite its name, covers just England and Wales. There is a separate Baptist Union of Scotland. The Association of Baptist Churches in Ireland is an all-Ireland organisation with 16,051 members in Northern Ireland (0.8% of the population) across 94 congregations. Other Baptist associations also exist in England, such as the Grace Baptist association and the Gospel Standard Baptists.

==== Charismatics and Pentecostalism ====
Assemblies of God in Great Britain are part of the World Assemblies of God Fellowship with over 600 churches in Great Britain. Assemblies of God Ireland cover the whole of the island of Ireland, including Northern Ireland. The Apostolic Church commenced in the early part of the 20th century in South Wales and now has over 110 churches across the United Kingdom. Elim Pentecostal Church as of 2013 had over 500 churches across the United Kingdom.

There is also a growing number of independent, charismatic churches that encourage Pentecostal practices as part of their worship. These are broadly grouped together as the British New Church Movement and could number up to 400,000 members. The phenomenon of immigrant churches and congregations that began with the arrival of the HMT Empire Windrush from the West Indies in 1948 stands as a unique trend. West Indian congregations that started from this time include the Church of God, New Testament Assembly and New Testament Church of God.

Africans began to arrive in the early 1980s and established their own congregations. Foremost among these are Matthew Ashimolowo from Nigeria and his Kingsway International Christian Centre in London that may be the largest church in Western Europe.

==== Methodism ====
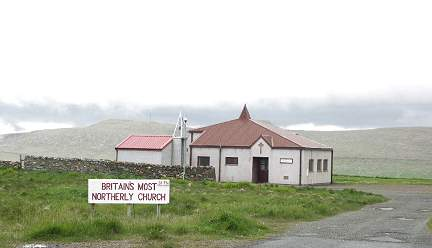
The Methodist church at Haroldswick is the most northerly church in the United Kingdom.

The Methodist movement traces its origin to John Wesley and the evangelical revival in the 18th century. The British Methodist Church, which has congregations throughout the nation, has around 188,000 members, and 4,110 churches (as of 2019), though only around 3,000 members in 50 congregations are in Scotland. In the 1960s, the Methodist Church made ecumenical overtures to the Church of England, aimed at church unity. Formally, these failed when they were rejected by the Church of England's General Synod in 1972. However, conversations and co-operation continued, leading on 1 November 2003 to the signing of a covenant between the two churches.

The Methodist Church in Ireland covers the whole of the island of Ireland, including Northern Ireland where it is the fourth-largest denomination with 133 congregations. The Fellowship of Independent Methodist Churches has 16 churches in Northern Ireland. Combined, these two Methodist denominations have 45,881 members (2.4% of Northern Ireland's population)

Other Methodist denominations in Britain include the Salvation Army, founded in 1865; the Free Methodist Church, a holiness church; and the Church of the Nazarene.

==== Presbyterianism and Congregationalism ====
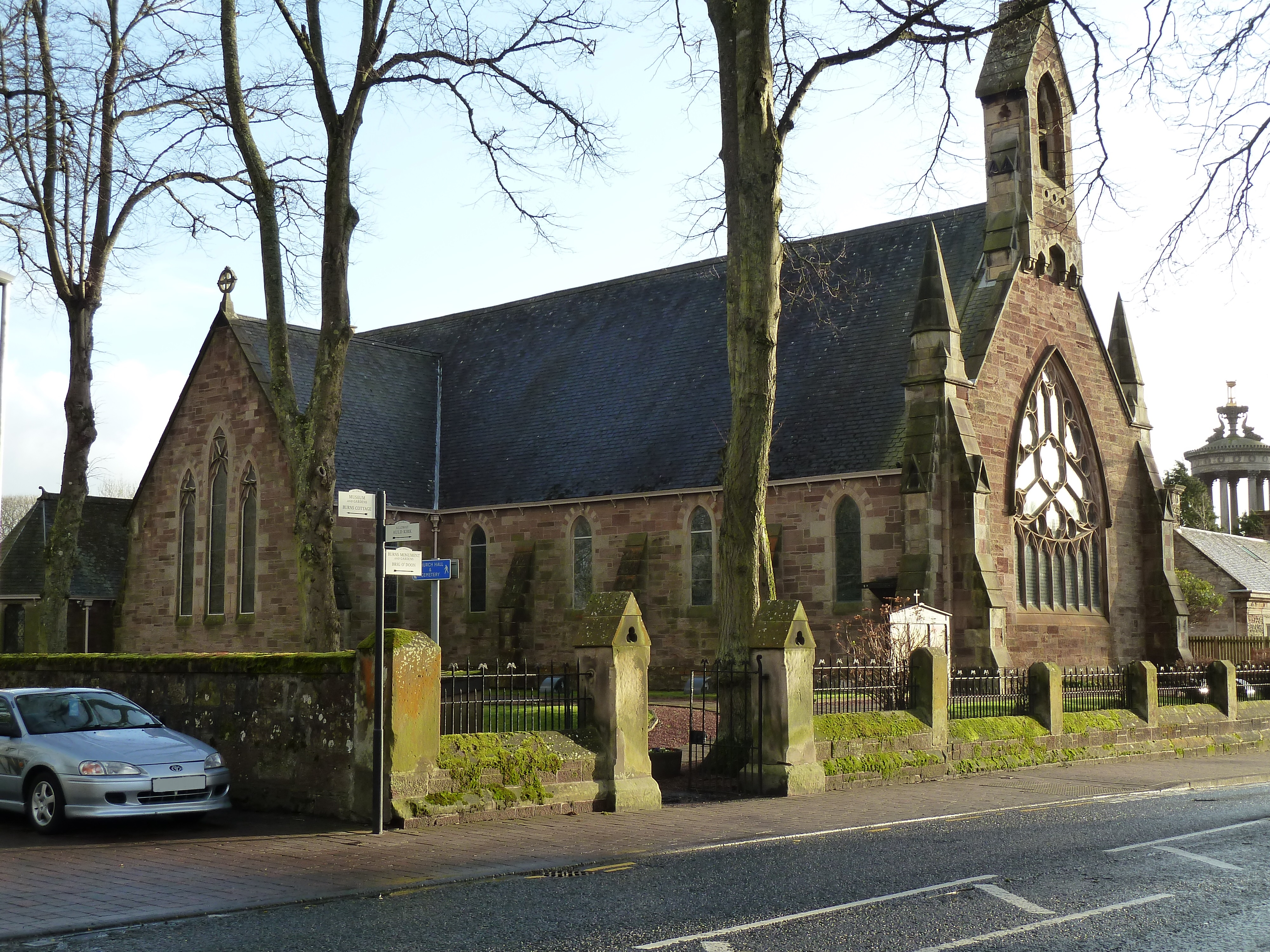
Alloway Parish Church in Ayr, a Church of Scotland parish

The Church of Scotland was principally shaped by John Knox, in the Reformation of 1560, when it split from the Catholic Church and established itself as a church in the Reformed tradition. The church is nominally Calvinist with a Presbyterian system of church government. The annual meeting of its general assembly is chaired by the Moderator of the General Assembly of the Church of Scotland. The Church of Scotland celebrates two sacraments, Baptism and the Lord's Supper, as well as five other rites, such as Confirmation and Matrimony. The church adheres to the Bible and the Westminster Confession of Faith, and is a member of the World Communion of Reformed Churches.

In Northern Ireland the Presbyterian Church of Ireland is the largest single Protestant denomination with 440 congregations across the region. The Non-subscribing Presbyterian Church of Ireland has 31 congregations in Northern Ireland, with the first Presbytery being formed in Antrim in 1725. Other smaller denominations include the Reformed Presbyterian Church (34 congregations) and the Free Presbyterian Church of Ulster (57 congregations). Combined these presbyterian denominations account for 329,223 persons (17.3% of Northern Ireland's population). In addition there are 20 churches in Northern Ireland affiliated with the Congregational Union of Ireland which collectively have 2,656 members.

The Presbyterian Church of Wales seceded from the Church of England in 1811 and formally formed itself into a separate body in 1823.

With its origins in the 16th century, English Presbyterianism, was initially contained with the Church of England until the Great Ejection of 1662. During the 18th century there were few Presbyterian congregations in England until they were revived by Scots who had moved south. In time, this led to the creation of Presbyterian Church of England in 1876. Its successor, the United Reformed Church (URC), a union of Presbyterian and Congregational churches, consists of about 1383 congregations in England, Scotland and Wales. There are about 600 Congregational churches in the United Kingdom. In England there are three main groups, the Congregational Federation, the Evangelical Fellowship of Congregational Churches, and about 100 Congregational churches that are loosely federated with other congregations in the Fellowship of Independent Evangelical Churches, or are unaffiliated. In Scotland the churches are mostly members of the Congregational Federation and in Wales which traditionally has a larger number of Congregationalists, most are members of the Union of Welsh Independents.

==== Quakers ====
The Britain Yearly Meeting is the umbrella body for the Religious Society of Friends (Quakers) in Great Britain, the Channel Isles and the Isle of Man. It has 14,260 adult members. Northern Ireland comes under the umbrella of the Ireland Yearly Meeting.

=== Catholicism ===
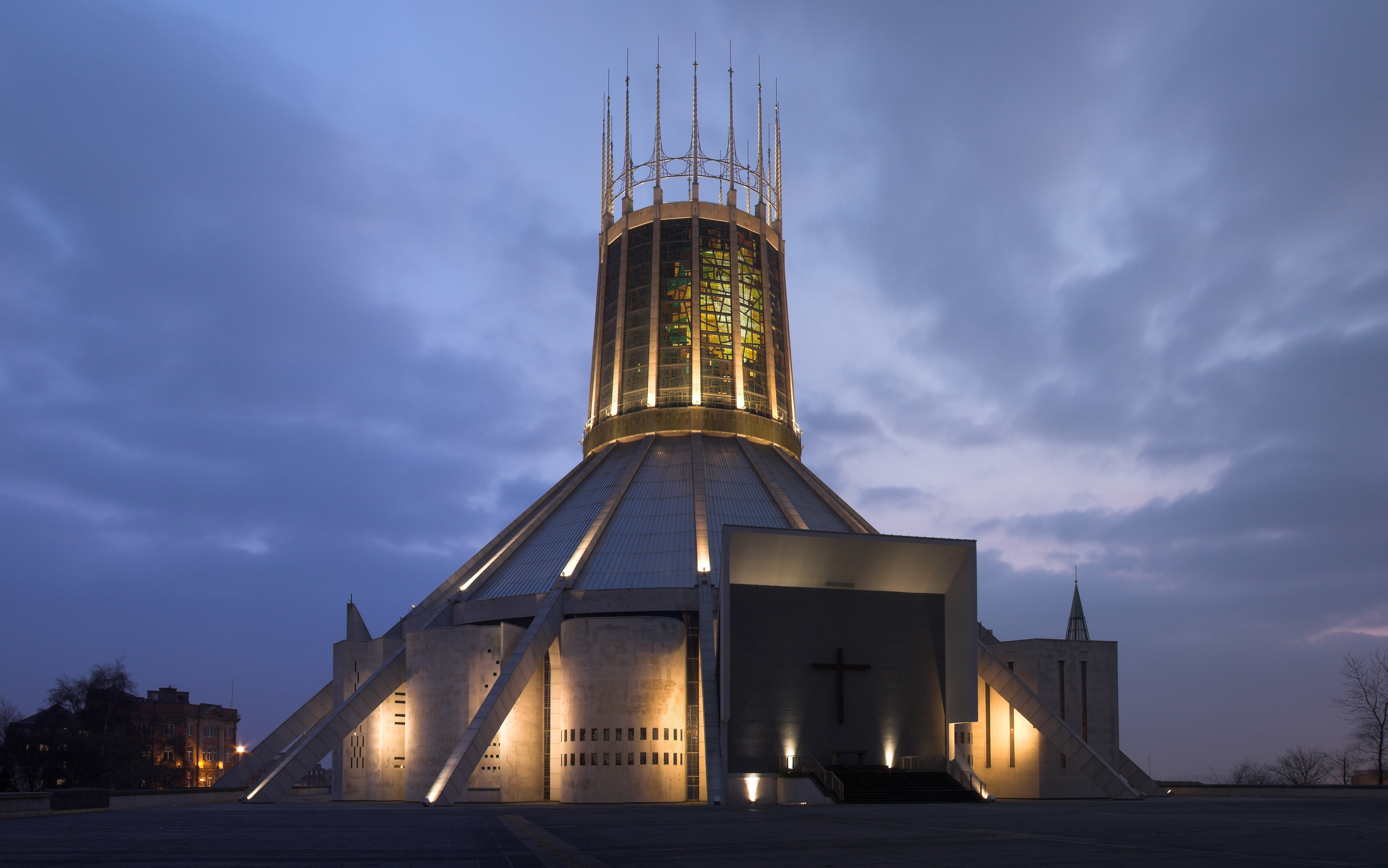
Liverpool Metropolitan Cathedral

The Catholic Church has separate national organisations for England, Wales, and Scotland, which means there is no single hierarchy for the Catholic Church in the United Kingdom. There is, however, a single apostolic nuncio to Great Britain, presently Archbishop Miguel Maury Buendía. Catholicism is the second largest denomination in England and Wales, with around five million members, mainly in England. Catholicism is also Scotland's second largest Christian denomination, representing a fifth of the population. The World Christian Database, published in 2021, estimated there were 6.39 million baptised Catholics in the UK, making it the second largest Christian denomination in the UK. Catholicism is the largest single denomination of Christianity in Northern Ireland and in the 2021 census, for the first time since the establishment of the state, the Catholic Church attained a plurality (42.3%) of the Northern Irish population. The apostolic nuncio to the whole of Ireland (both Northern Ireland and the Republic of Ireland) is Luis Mariano Montemayor. Members of the Eastern Catholic Churches in the United Kingdom are served by their own clergy and do not belong to the Latin Church dioceses but are still in full communion with the Bishop of Rome.

The number of Catholics peaked in the 1960s, but has been on a gradual decline ever since, except in Northern Ireland where Catholicism grew slightly from 45.1% in 2011 to 45.7% in 2021 Census. Official attendance estimates for both the Catholic Church and the Church of England show that despite recovering since the Covid pandemic, weekly church attendance has fallen significantly since 2019.

=== Orthodoxy ===
Orthodox Christianity is a relatively minor faith in the United Kingdom when compared to Protestantism and Catholicism; most Orthodox churches cater to immigrants from Eastern Europe, the Balkans, the Middle East, North Africa, and to a lesser extent, East Asia and South East Asia. It is a relatively minor faith among Britons themselves. In 2013 there were roughly 464,000 members of Orthodox churches in the UK.

==== Eastern Orthodoxy ====
Adherents of Eastern Orthodox Christianity in the United Kingdom are traditionally organised in accordance with patrimonial ecclesiastical jurisdictions.

The Russian Orthodox Church has a Diocese of Sourozh, which covers Great Britain and Ireland, and the Russian Orthodox Church Outside Russia also has a diocese of Great Britain and Western Europe.

The Greek Orthodox Church is represented by the Ecumenical Patriarchate, which has established the Archdiocese of Thyateira and Great Britain, that covers England, Wales, Scotland and the Greek Orthodox Metropolis of Ireland that covers Ireland.

The Patriarchate of Antioch has several parishes and missions within the Diocese of the British Isles and Ireland. Other Eastern Orthodox Churches represented in the United Kingdom include the Georgian Orthodox Church, the Romanian Orthodox Church, the Bulgarian Orthodox Church, the Serbian Orthodox Church, and the Albanian Orthodox Church.

==== Oriental Orthodoxy ====
Adherents of Oriental Orthodox Christianity in the United Kingdom are also traditionally organised in accordance with their patrimonial ecclesiastical jurisdictions, each community having its own parishes and priests. The Coptic Orthodox Church of Alexandria has two regional Dioceses in the United Kingdom: the Diocese of Ireland, Scotland, North East England, and the Diocese of the Midlands. Other Oriental Orthodox Churches represented in the United Kingdom include the Syriac Orthodox Church, the Armenian Apostolic Church, the Eritrean Orthodox Tewahedo Church and the Ethiopian Orthodox Tewahedo Church. The homegrown British Orthodox Church and Irish Orthodox Church, although both minor, are also represented.

=== Other Trinitarian denominations ===
Other denominations and groups include the Seventh-day Adventist Church, the Seventh Day Baptists, the Plymouth Brethren, and Newfrontiers.

=== Non-Trinitarian denominations ===
==== Mormonism ====
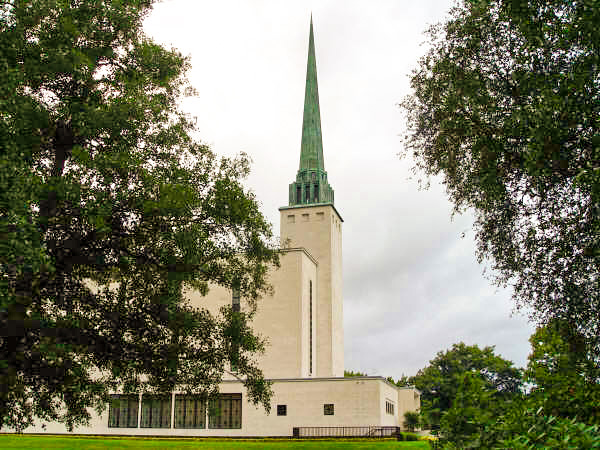
London England Temple (LDS)

The first Mormon missionaries from the Church of Latter Day Saints, as Joseph Smith's movement was then known, arrived in the British Isles in 1837, where they were more often known as "Mormonites".

By 1900 as many as 100,000 converts had joined the religion, but most of these early members soon emigrated to the United States to join the main body of the Church of Jesus Christ of Latter-Day Saints. From the 1950s emigration to the United States began to be discouraged and local congregations grew more rapidly. In 2025, the church claims just over 186,000 members across the United Kingdom, in over 300 local congregations, known as 'wards' or 'branches'. The church also maintains two temples in England, the first opening in the London area in 1958, and the second completed in 1998 in Preston and known as the Preston England Temple. Preston is also the site of the first preaching by LDS missionaries in 1837, and is home to the oldest continually existing Latter Day Saint congregation anywhere in the world. Restored 1994–2000, the Gadfield Elm Chapel in Worcestershire is the oldest extant chapel of the LDS Church.

A Community of Christ church in Ashfield, England

There are other denominations from the Latter Day Saint movement in the UK, such as the Community of Christ, formerly known as the Reorganised Church of Jesus Christ of Latter-Day Saints.

==== Other non-Trinitarian denominations ====
Jehovah's Witnesses had 137,631 "publishers" (a term referring to members actively involved in preaching) in the United Kingdom in 2015. The Church of Christ, Scientist is also represented in the UK.

The General Assembly of Unitarian and Free Christian Churches is the umbrella organisation for Unitarian, Free Christian and other liberal religious congregations in the United Kingdom. The Unitarian Christian Association was formed in 1991.

There are an estimated 18,000 Christadelphians in the UK.

== Religious minorities ==
=== Islam ===
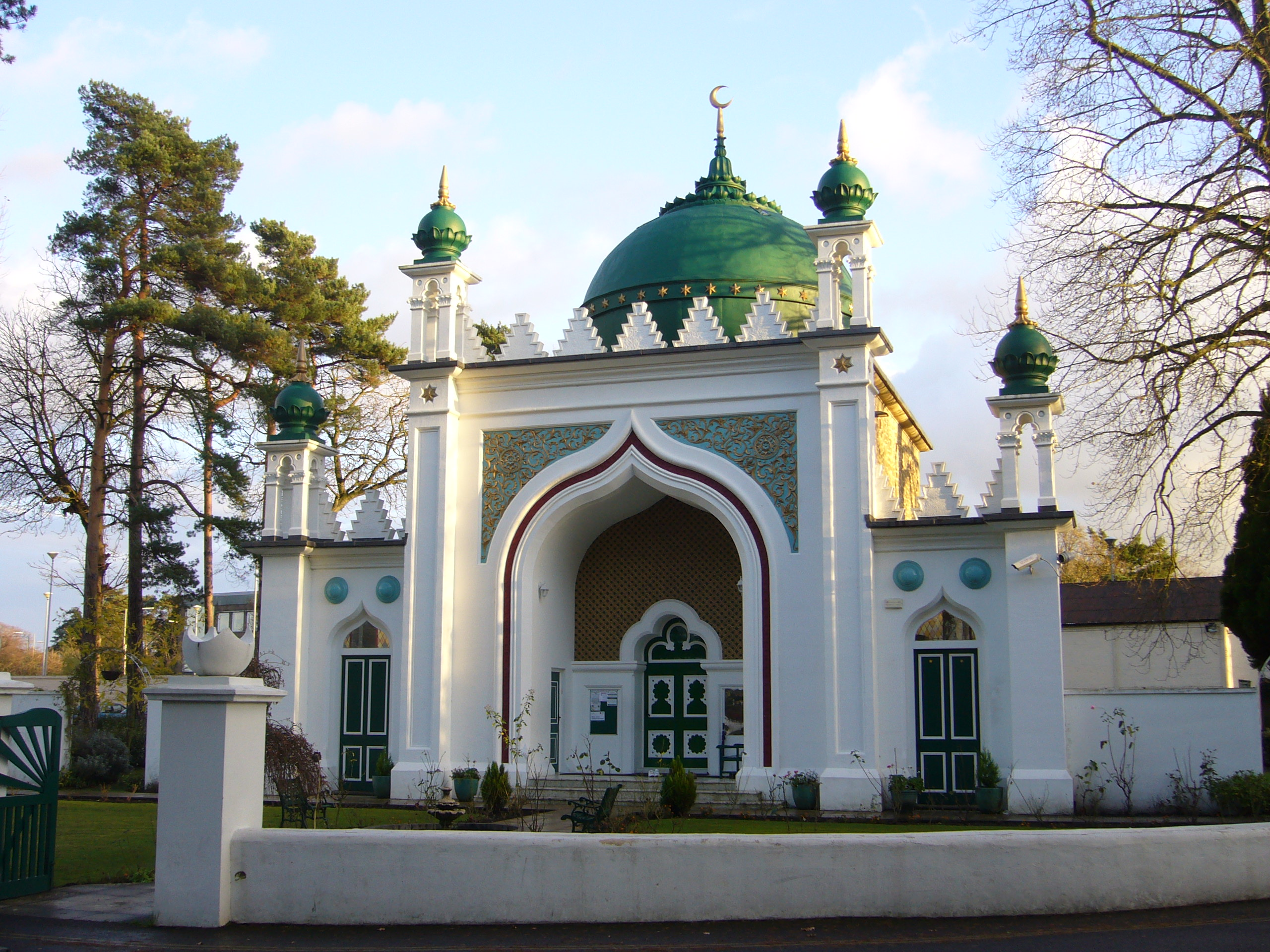
Shah Jahan Mosque in Woking is the oldest purpose-built mosque in the United Kingdom.

Islam is followed by 5.91% of the UK's population, according to the 2021-22 Census. There are 3,960,980 Muslims forming 6.7% in England; 2.2% each in Wales and Scotland and 0.57% in Northern Ireland.

Estimates in 2009 suggested a total of about 2.4 million Muslims over all the United Kingdom. Muslims in the United Kingdom tend to live around the major population centres such as London. Between 2001 and 2009 the Muslim population increased roughly 10 times faster than the rest of society.

Most Muslim immigrants to the United Kingdom came from former colonies. The biggest groups of Muslims are of Pakistani, Bangladeshi, Indian and Arab origins, with the remainder coming from Muslim-dominated areas such as Southwest Asia, Somalia, Malaysia, and Indonesia. During the 18th century, lascars (sailors) who worked for the British East India Company settled in port towns with local wives. These numbered only 24,037 in 1891 but 51,616 on the eve of World War I. Naval cooks also came from what is now the Sylhet Division of Bangladesh. From the 1950s onwards, the growing Muslim population has led to a number of notable Mosques being established, including East London Mosque, London Central Mosque, Manchester Central Mosque, London Markaz, Baitul Futuh of the Ahmadiyya Muslim Community and Cambridge Central Mosque. According to Kevin Brice, a researcher at the University of Wales, Trinity Saint David, thousands convert to Islam annually and there are approximately 100,000 converts to Islam in Britain, where they run two mosques.

According to a Labour Force Survey estimate, the total number of Muslims in Great Britain in 2008 was 2,422,000, around 4 per cent of the total population. Between 2004 and 2008, the Muslim population grew by more than 500,000. In 2010, The Pew Forum on Religion and Public Life estimated 2,869,000 Muslims in Great Britain. The largest age-bracket within the British Muslim population were those under the age of 4, at 301,000 in September 2008. The Muslim Council of Britain and the Islamic Forum of Europe are the umbrellas organisations for many local, regional and specialist Islamic organisations in the United Kingdom, although it is disputed how representative this organisation is of British Muslims as a whole.

=== Hinduism ===
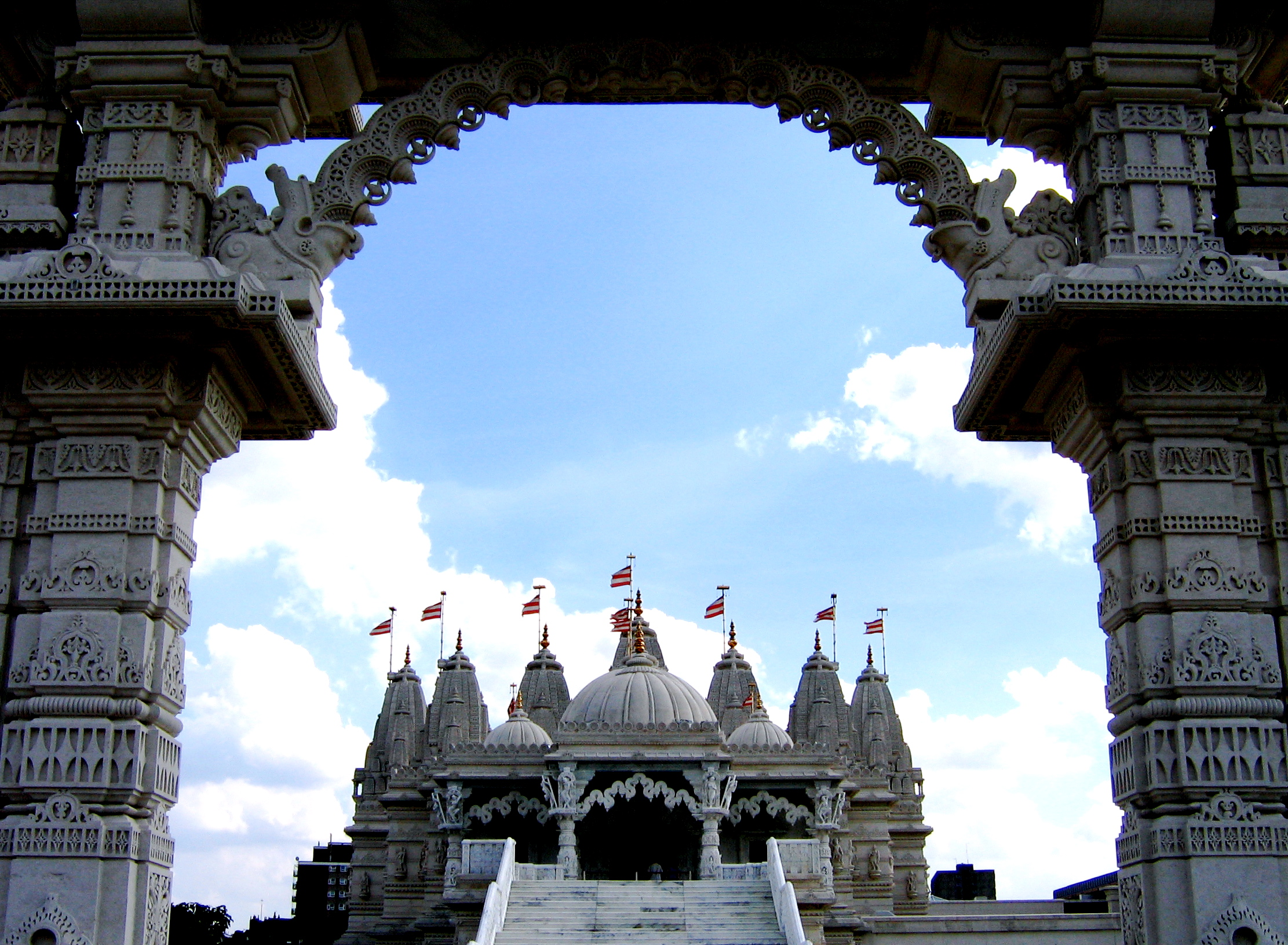
The Neasden Temple is the second largest temple of Hinduism in Europe.

Hinduism in the United Kingdom resulted from the British rule in India. There are 1,066,894 Hindus in Great Britain according to the 2021 census constituting 1.59% of the population, although some estimates put this number at nearly 1.5 million. About half of all British Hindus live in London metropolitan area. Small Hindu Communities are also found in Scotland (0.6%), Northern Ireland (0.22%) and in Wales (0.4%).

According to United Kingdom's Office of National Statistics, of all ethnic minorities in Britain, the British Hindus had the highest rate of economic activity. Hindus are more likely than the general population to have higher education and Hindu men are more likely than the general population to be entrepreneurs. British Hindus also have the third lowest poverty level and the lowest rates of arrest, trial or imprisonment. Hindus also has the lowest prison population (~0%).

=== Sikhism ===
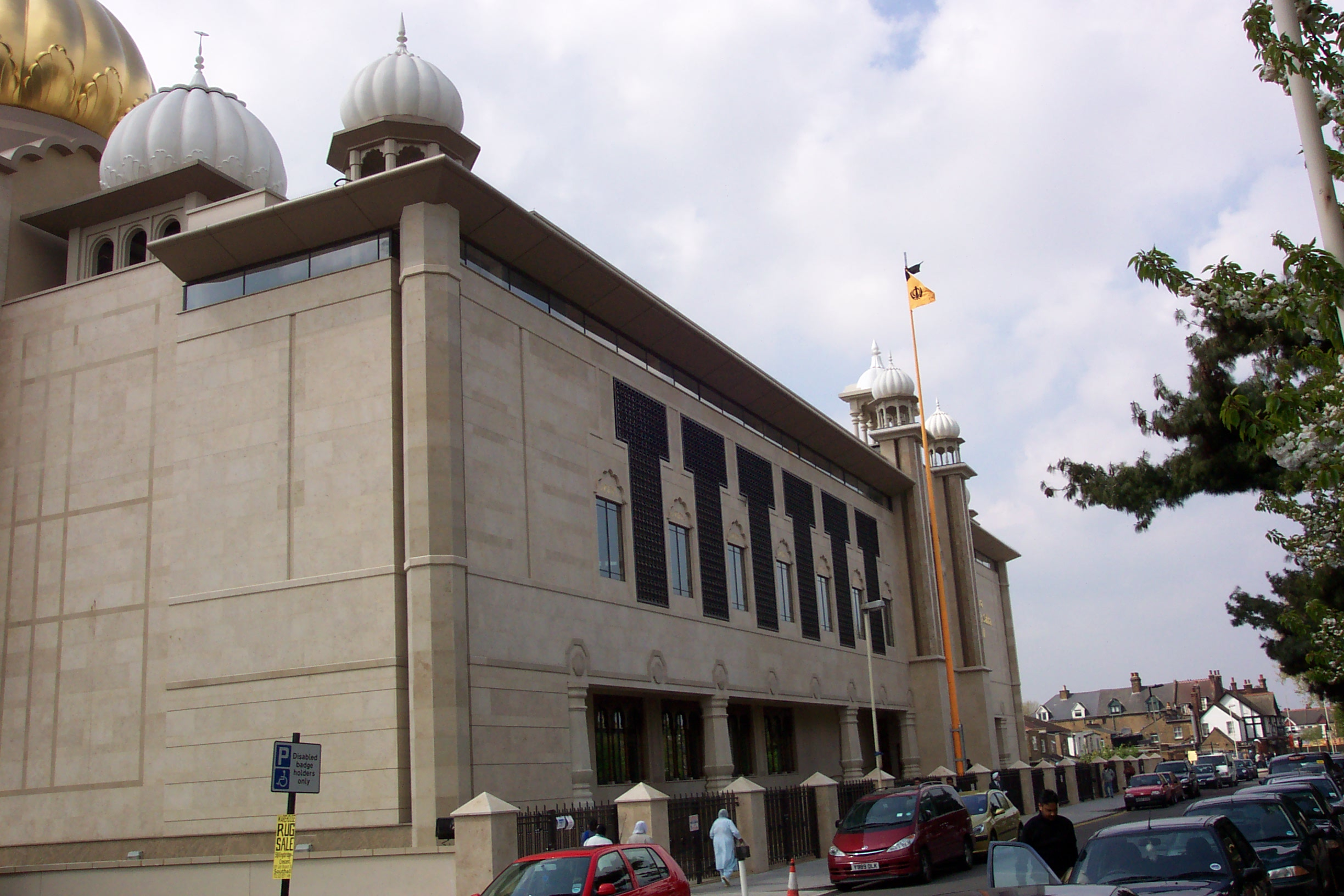
Gurdwara Sri Guru Singh Sabha, Southall, UK

There are 524,140 Sikhs in the United Kingdom constituting 0.88% of the population, according to the 2021 Census. While England is home to the majority of Sikhs in the United Kingdom, small communities also exist in Northern Ireland, Scotland and Wales.

The first recorded Sikh settler in the United Kingdom was Maharaja Duleep Singh, dethroned and exiled in 1849 at the age of 14, after the Anglo-Sikh wars. During the reign of King Edward VII the first Sikh society in the UK was founded in 1908, it was called The Khalsa Jatha. The first Sikh Gurdwara was established in 1911, in Shepherd's Bush, Putney, London. The first wave of Sikh migration came in the 1940s, mostly of men from the Punjab seeking work in industries such as foundries and textiles. These new arrivals mostly settled in London, Birmingham, Wolverhampton, the Midlands and West Yorkshire. Thousands of Sikhs from East Africa followed later.

=== Buddhism ===
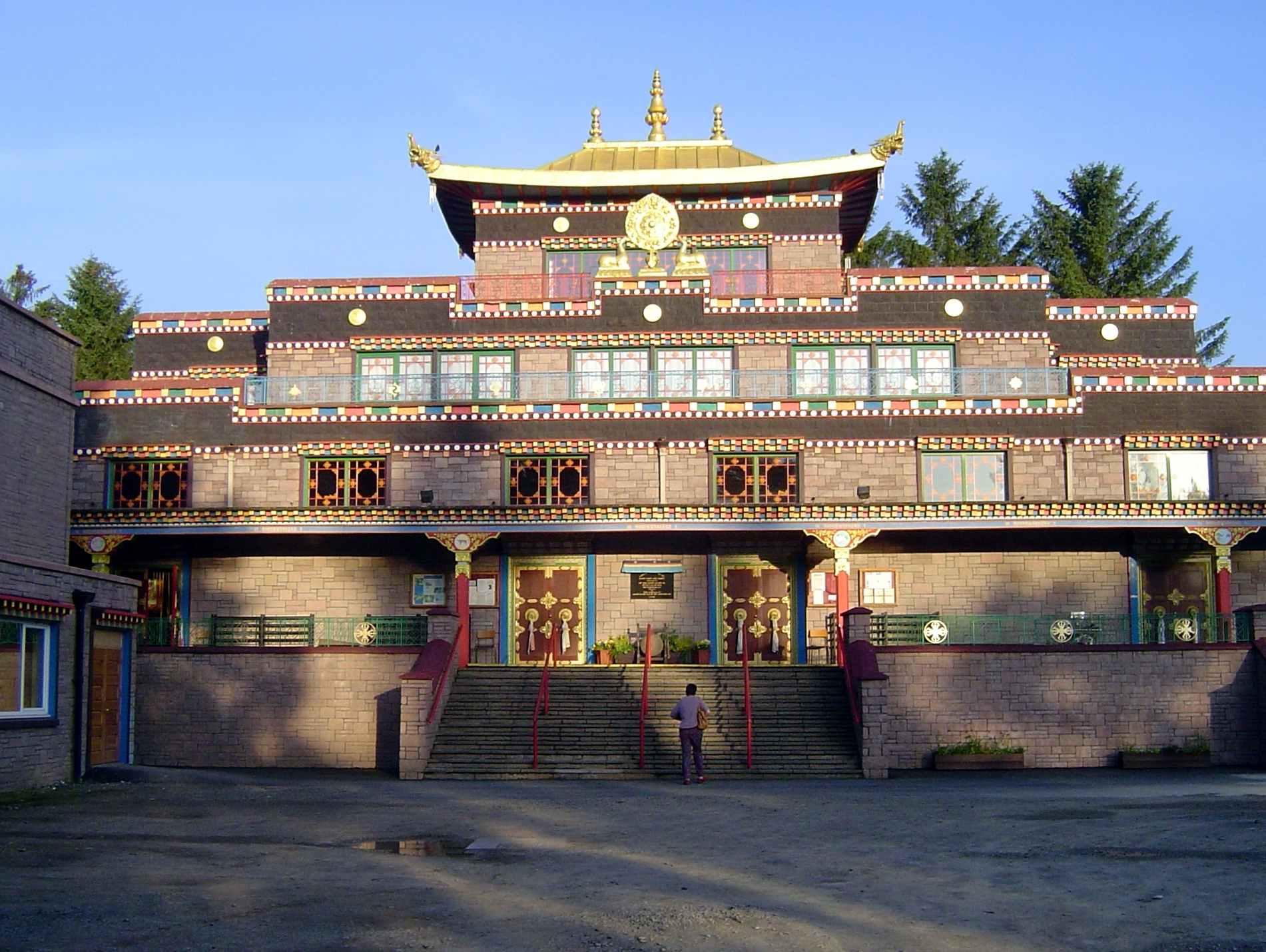
Kagyu Samyé Ling Monastery and Tibetan Centre in Scotland

In the UK census for 2011, there were about 178,000 people who registered their religion as Buddhism. The earliest Buddhist influence on Britain came through its imperial connections with Southeast Asia, and as a result the early connections were with the Theravada traditions of Burma, Thailand, and Sri Lanka. The tradition of study resulted in the foundation of the Pali Text Society, which undertook the task of translating the Pali Canon of Theravāda Buddhist Tradition into English. Buddhism as a path of practise was pioneered by the Theosophists, Madame Blavatsky and Colonel Olcott, and in 1880 they became the first Westerners to receive the Three refuges and Five precepts, the formal conversion ceremony by which one traditionally accepted and becomes a Buddhist.

In 1924 London's Buddhist Society was founded, and in 1926 the Theravadin London Buddhist Vihara. The rate of growth was slow but steady through the century, and the 1950s saw the development of interest in Zen Buddhism. In 1967 Kagyu Samyé Ling Monastery and Tibetan Centre, now the largest Tibetan Buddhist centre in Western Europe, was founded in Scotland. The first home-grown Buddhist movement was also founded in 1967, the Friends of the Western Buddhist Order (now the Triratna Buddhist Community). Thai Forest Tradition of Ajahn Chah was also established at Chithurst Buddhist Monastery in West Sussex in 1979, giving rise to branch monasteries, including Amaravati Buddhist Monastery and Aruna Ratanagiri.There are also other groups like Order of Interbeing, Soka Gakkai, and New Kadampa Tradition in the United Kingdom.

=== Judaism ===
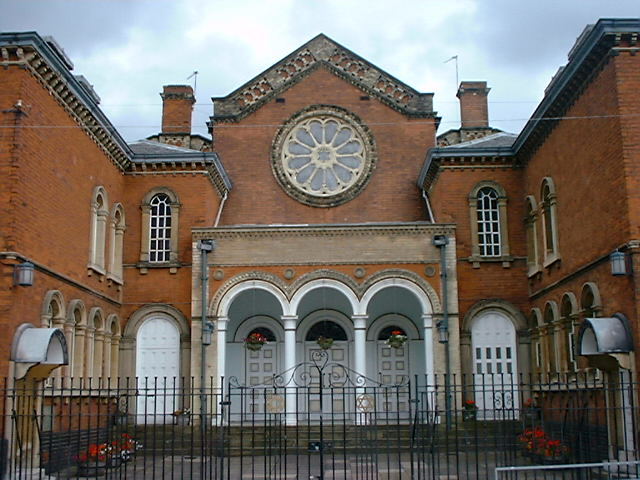
Singers Hill Synagogue, Birmingham, England

The first Jewish community in what is now the UK was attested from at least the 1060s, but was expelled in 1290, although non-practising Jews maintained themselves as a small but identifiable group until the 1560s in London. Practising Jews occasionally travelled to England, and individual Jews settled in various parts of the British Isles. In the early 1600s, a small community of Sephardic Jews was identified in Bristol, and ordered to leave in 1609. There have continuously been practising Jews in England since at least the 1630s, but it was not until 1656 that Oliver Cromwell made it known they would not be subject to expulsion. The largely Iberian and German early community grew only steadily from the mid 17th century until the late 19th century, when a large wave of Eastern European immigrants roughly quadrupled the population. Another wave of largely German refugees increased it by a further 50% between 1933 and 1945.

In 1841 Isaac Lyon Goldsmid was made baronet, the first Jew to receive a hereditary title. The first Jewish Lord Mayor of the City of London, Sir David Salomons, was elected in 1855. In 1858, practising Jews were allowed to become serving MPs; on 26 July 1858, Lionel de Rothschild was finally allowed to sit in the House of Commons of the United Kingdom when the law restricting the oath of office to Christians was changed, although Benjamin Disraeli, a baptised, teenage convert to Christianity of Jewish parentage, was already an MP at this time and rose to become Prime Minister in 1874; David Ricardo, another convert to Christianity, had been an MP in the 1810s. In 1884 Nathan Mayer Rothschild, 1st Baron Rothschild became the first practising Jewish member of the British House of Lords; again Disraeli was already a member.

British Jews number around 300,000 with the United Kingdom having the fifth largest Jewish community worldwide. However, this figure did not include Jews who identified 'by ethnicity only' in England and Wales or Scottish Jews who identified as Jewish by upbringing but held no current religion. The largest concentrations of Jews are in London and its environs, Greater Manchester, and Leeds.

== Indigenous religions ==
=== Modern paganism ===
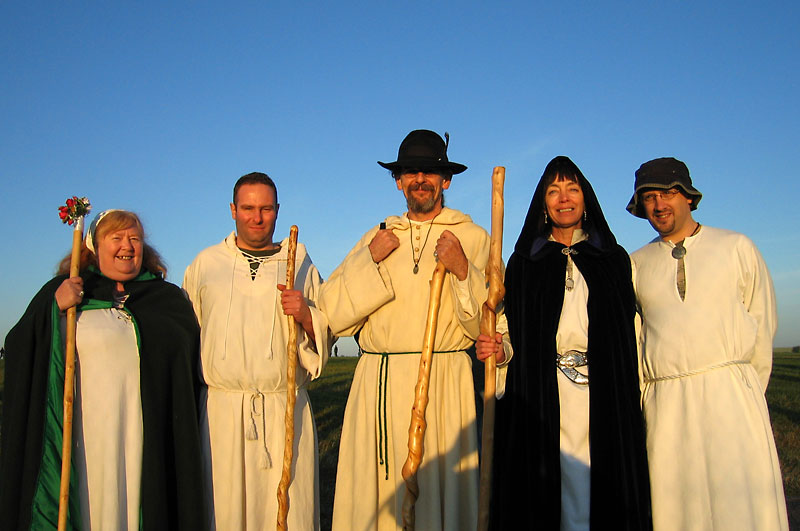
Modern druids

In the United Kingdom, census figures do not allow an accurate breakdown of traditions within the Pagan heading, as a campaign by the Pagan Federation before the 2001 Census encouraged Wiccans, Heathens, Druids and others all to use the same write-in term 'Pagan' in order to maximise the numbers reported. For the first time, respondents were able to write in an affiliation not covered by the checklist of common religions, and a total of 42,262 people from England, Scotland and Wales declared themselves to be Pagans by this method. These figures were not immediately analysed by the Office for National Statistics, but were released after an application by the Pagan Federation of Scotland.

In the 2001 Census, a total of 42,262 people from England, Scotland, and Wales declared themselves to be pagans or adherents of Wicca. However, other surveys have led to estimates of around 250,000 or even higher.

According to the 2011 UK Census, there are roughly 53,172 people who identify as Pagan in England, (Note: People who strictly identified as "Pagan". Other Pagan paths, such as Wicca or Druidism, have not been included in this number.) and 3,448 in Wales, (Note: People who strictly identified as "Pagan". Other Pagan paths, such as Wicca or Druidism, have not been included in this number.) (Note: People who strictly identified as "Wiccan". Other Pagan paths, such as Druidism, and general "Pagan" have not been included in this number.)

==== Wicca ====
In the 2011 UK Census 11,026 people identified as Wiccans in England and 740 in Wales. (Note: People who strictly identified as "Wiccan". Other Pagan paths, such as Druidism, and general "Pagan" have not been included in this number.)

==== Druidry ====
Modern Druidry grew out of the Celtic revival in 18th century Romanticism. A 2012 Druid analysis estimates that there are roughly 11,000 Druids in Britain.

==== Heathenry ====
Heathenry consists of a variety of modern movements attempting to revive Germanic paganism, such as that practised in the British Isles by the Anglo-Saxon and Norse peoples prior to Christianisation. In the 2011 UK Census 2,108 people identified as Heathens. Asatru UK was founded in 2013 and operates as a country-wide group for all inclusive Heathens. As of May 2021, Asatru UK had 2,903 members of its Facebook group. The group currently does not own land and thus is in the process of carving portable god posts that can be used in a vé. The first of these was of the god Woden and was consecrated at a gathering in 2021.

== Other religions and belief system ==
=== Jainism ===
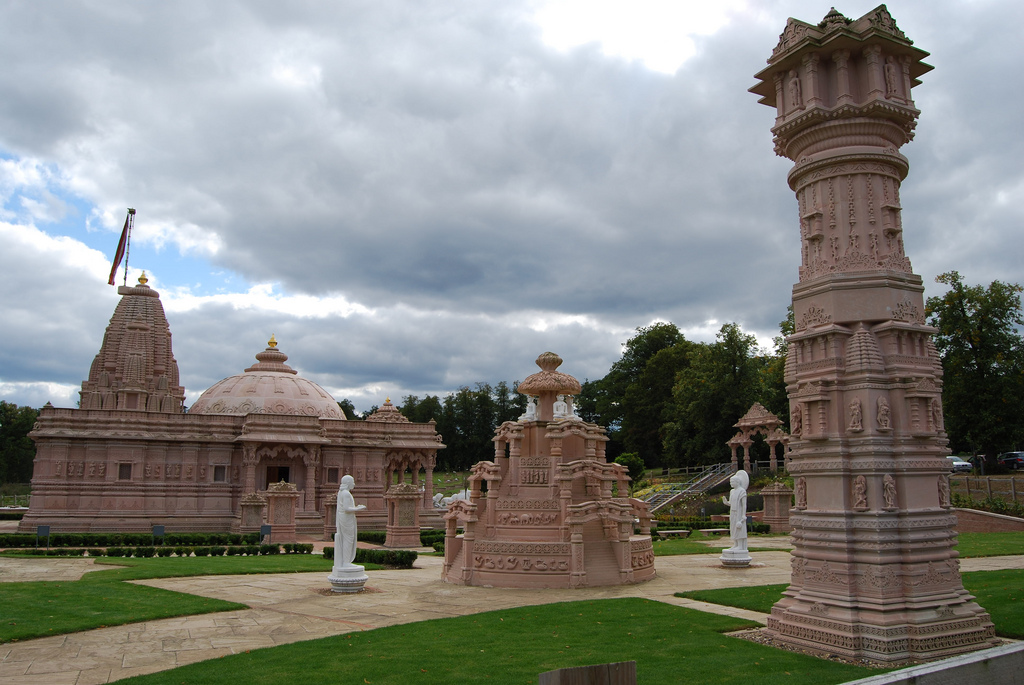
Jain Temple Oshwal Centre, Potters Bar, Hertfordshire, UK

As of 2011, there are around 20,288 Jains in the United Kingdom. Leicester houses one of the world's few Jain temples outside of India. There is an Institute of Jainology at Greenford, London.

One of the first Jain settlers, Champat Rai Jain, was in England during 1892–1897 to study law. He established the Rishabh Jain Lending Library in 1930. Later, he translated several Jain texts into English.

=== Baháʼí Faith ===
The Baháʼí Faith in the United Kingdom has a historical connection with the earliest phases of the Baháʼí Faith starting in 1845 and has had a major effect on the development of communities of the religion in far flung nations around the world. It is estimated that between 1951 and 1993, Baháʼís from the United Kingdom settled in 138 countries. At the 2011 UK Census, there were 5,021 Baháʼís in just England and Wales. This declined by the 2021 UK Census to 4,725, a diminution of just under 6%.

=== Zoroastrianism ===
Zoroastrianism in the United Kingdom has a relatively long history. Britain's first ethnically South Asian parliamentarian was Zoroastrian and there have been Zoroastrians in the UK for over a century. Many come from the Zoroastrian Parsi community of northwest India, which was under the control of the British Raj until 1948. According to the 2021 UK census, there were 4,105 Zoroastrians in England and Wales, of which 4,043 were in England. The majority (51%) of these (2,050) were in London, most notably the boroughs of Barnet, Harrow and Westminster. The remaining 49% of English Zoroastrians were scattered relatively evenly throughout the country, with the second and third largest concentrations being Birmingham (72) and Manchester (47).

== UK-origin movements ==
=== Christian ===
- Anglicanism
  - Anglo-Catholicism
- Baptists
  - General Baptists
  - Reformed Baptists
  - Seventh Day Baptists
- British Israelism
- British New Church
- British Unitarians
- Catholic Apostolic Church (Irvingism)
- Higher Life movement
- Methodism
  - The Salvation Army
- Plymouth Brethren
- Puritans
  - Congregationalism
  - Presbyterianism
    - English Presbyterianism
    - Scottish Presbyterianism
- Quakers
- Swedenborgianism

=== Other ===
- Chaos magic
- Druidry
- New Kadampa Tradition
- Thelema
- Triratna Buddhism
- Wicca

== Religion and society ==
=== Religion and politics ===
Though the main political parties are secular, the formation of the Labour Party was influenced by Christian socialism, Ethical humanism, and by leaders from a nonconformist backgrounds, such as Keir Hardie. Labour's early development was also markedly influenced by non-religious philosophies such as humanism through Ethical movement, which gave rise to the Fabian Society and incubated prominent Labour people such as its first Prime Minister, Ramsay MacDonald (who even previously served as President of Humanists UK). Most Labour leaders have been atheists and agnostics (exceptions include Smith, Blair, Brown, and Corbyn). On the other hand, the Church of England was once nicknamed "the Conservative Party at prayer", though this has changed since the 1980s as the Church has moved to the left of the Conservative Party on social and economic issues.

Some minor parties are explicitly 'religious' in ideology: two 'Christian' parties – the Christian Party and the Christian Peoples Alliance, fielded joint candidates at the 2009 European Parliament elections and increased their share of the vote to come eighth, with 249,493 votes (1.6% of total votes cast), and in London, where the CPA had three councillors, the Christian parties picked up 51,336 votes (2.9% of the vote), up slightly from the 45,038 gained in 2004.

The Church of England is represented in the UK Parliament by 26 bishops (the Lords Spiritual) and the British monarch is a member of the church (required under Article 2 of the Treaty of Union) as well as its supreme governor. The Lords Spiritual have seats in the House of Lords and debate government policies affecting the whole of the United Kingdom. The Church of England also has the right to draft legislative measures (related to religious administration) through the General Synod that can then be passed into law by Parliament. The Prime Minister, regardless of personal beliefs, plays a key role in the appointment of Church of England bishops, although in July 2007 Gordon Brown proposed reforms of the Prime Minister's ability to affect Church of England appointments.

=== Religion and education ===
Religious education and Collective Worship are compulsory in many state schools in England and Wales by virtue of clauses 69 and 70 of the School Standards and Framework Act 1998. Clause 71 of the act gives parents the right to withdraw their children from Religious Education and Collective Worship and parents should be informed of their right in accordance with guidelines published by the Department for Education; "a school should ensure parents or carers are informed of this right". The content of the religious education is decided locally by the Standing Advisory Council on Religious Education.

In England and Wales, a significant number of state funded schools are faith schools with the vast majority Christian (mainly either of Church of England or Catholic) though there are also Jewish, Muslim and Sikh faith schools. Faith schools follow the same national curriculum as state schools, though with the added ethos of the host religion. Until 1944 there was no requirement for state schools to provide religious education or worship, although most did so. The Education Act 1944 introduced a requirement for a daily act of collective worship and for religious education but did not define what was allowable under these terms. The act contained provisions to allow parents to withdraw their children from these activities and for teachers to refuse to participate. The Education Reform Act 1988 introduced a further requirement that the majority of collective worship be "wholly or mainly of a broadly Christian character". According to a 2003 report from the Office for Standards in Education, a "third of governing bodies do not fulfil their statutory duties adequately, sometimes because of a failure to pursue thoroughly enough such matters as arranging a daily act of collective worship".

In Scotland, the majority of schools are non-denominational, but separate Catholic schools, with an element of control by the Catholic Church, are provided within the state system. The Education (Scotland) Act 1980 imposes a statutory duty on all local authorities to provide religious education and religious observance in Scottish schools. These are currently defined by the Scottish Government's Curriculum for Excellence (2005).

=== Religion and prison ===
Prisoners are given religious freedom and privileges while serving their sentences. This includes access to a chaplain or religious advisor, authorised religious reading materials, ability to change faith, as well as other privileges. Several faith-based outreach programmes provide faith promoting guidance and counselling.

Every three months, the Ministry of Justice collects data, including religious affiliation, of all UK prisoners and is published as the Offender Management Caseload Statistics. This data is then compiled into reports and published in the House of Commons library.

On 31 March 2015 the prison population of England and Wales was recorded as 49% Christian, 14% Muslim, 2% Buddhist, 2% other religions and 31% no religion. In this statistics, Muslims happen to be the most disproportionately represented religious group facing arrest, trial and imprisonment, with 13.1% of prisoners being Muslims while the community represents 4% of those aged 15 years or older within the general population. The Prison Officers' Association has put that down to thousands of prisoners becoming so-called "convenience Muslims" – converting to the religion to deliberately play the system. [ ...] It added they were also being made even more vulnerable to radicalisation."

=== Religion and the media ===
The Communications Act 2003 requires certain broadcasters in the United Kingdom to carry a "suitable quantity and range of programmes" dealing with religion and other beliefs, as part of their public service broadcasting. Prominent examples of religious programming include the BBC television programme Songs of Praise, aired on a Sunday evening with an average weekly audience of 2.5 million, and the Thought for the Day slot on BBC Radio 4. Channels also offer documentaries on, or from the perspective of a criticism of organised religion. A significant example is Richard Dawkins' two-part Channel 4 documentary, The Root of all Evil?. Open disbelief of, or even mockery of organised religion, is not regarded as a taboo in the British media, though it has occasionally provoked controversy – for example, the movie Monty Python's Life of Brian, the poem "The Love That Dares to Speak Its Name", and the musical Jerry Springer: The Opera, all of which involved characters based on Jesus, were subject to public outcry and blasphemy allegations, while The Satanic Verses, a novel by British Indian author Salman Rushdie which includes a fantasy sequence about Muhammed, caused global protests including several by British Muslims.

=== Religion and social identity: patron saints of the home nations ===
- Saint George is the patron saint of England.
- Saint Andrew is the patron saint of Scotland.
- Saint David is the patron saint of Wales.
- Saint Patrick is the patron saint of Ireland.

=== Interfaith dialogue, tolerance, religious discrimination and secularism ===
==== Interfaith dialogue ====
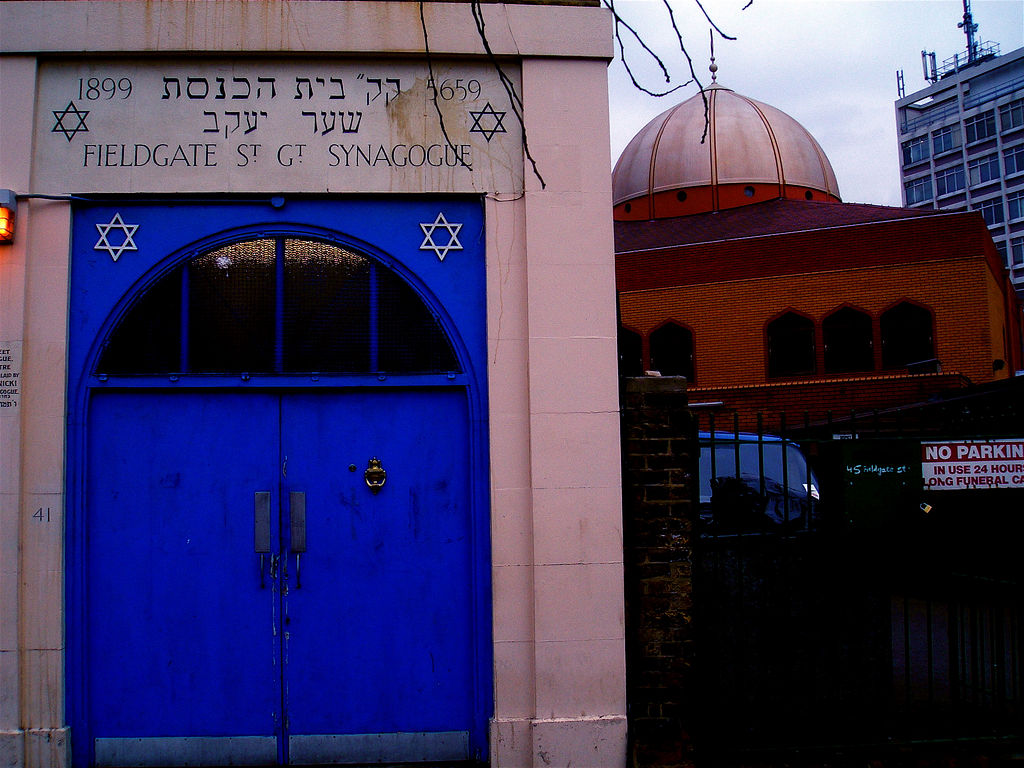
London neighbours, the Fieldgate Street Great Synagogue and the East London Mosque

The Interfaith Network for the United Kingdom encompasses the main faith organisations of the United Kingdom, either directly with denominational important representatives or through joint bodies for these denominations, promotes local interfaith cooperation, promotes understanding between faiths and convenes meetings and conferences where social and religious questions of concern to the different faith communities can be examined together, including meetings of the Network's 'Faith Communities Consultative Forum'.

Ecumenical friendship and cooperation has gradually developed between Christian denominations and where inter-sect prejudice exists this has via education and employment policy been made a pressing public matter in dealing with its two prominent examples – sectarianism in Glasgow and Northern Ireland – where segregation is declining.

==== Tolerance and Religious Discrimination ====
In the early 21st century, the Racial and Religious Hatred Act 2006 made it an offence in England and Wales to incite hatred against a person on the grounds of their religion. The common law offences of blasphemy and blasphemous libel were abolished with the coming into effect of the Criminal Justice and Immigration Act 2008 on 8 July 2008.

2005–2010 polls have shown that public opinion in the United Kingdom generally tends towards a suspicion or outright disapproval of radical or evangelical religiosity, though moderate groups and individuals are rarely subject to less favourable treatment from society or employers.

The Equality Act 2010 prohibits discrimination against people on the basis of religion, in the supply of goods and services and selection for employment, subject to very limited exceptions (such as the right of schools and religious institutions to appoint paid ministers).

==== Secularism ====
There is no strict separation of church and state in the United Kingdom. Accordingly, most public officials may display the most common identifiers of a major religion in the course of their duties – for example, rosary beads. Chaplains are provided in the armed forces (see Royal Army Chaplains' Department, RAF Chaplains Branch) and in prisons.

Although school uniform codes are generally drawn up flexibly enough to accommodate compulsory items of religious dress, some schools have banned wearing the crucifix in a necklace, arguing that to do so is not a requirement of Christianity where they prohibit all other necklaces. Post-adolescence, the wearing of a necklace is permitted in some F.E. colleges who permit religious insignia necklaces on a wider basis, which are without exception permitted at universities.

Some churches have warned that the Equality Act 2010 could force them to go against their faith when hiring staff.

In 2011, judges ruled that the European Convention on Human Rights required bed-and-breakfast owners to rent rooms to same-sex couples.

In 2011, Clive Bone sued Bideford Town Council for opening meetings with prayer. The High Court ruled in Bone's favour but, soon afterward, the government passed new laws permitting prayer at town meetings.

In 2011, two judges of the Court of Appeal of England and Wales upheld previous statements in the country's jurisprudence that the (non-canon) laws of the United Kingdom 'do not include Christianity'. Therefore, a local authority was acting lawfully in denying a Christian married couple the right to foster care because of stated negative views on homosexuality. In terms of the rights recognised "in the case of fostering arrangements at least, the right of homosexuals to equality [pursuant to the Equality Act 2010] should take precedence over the right of Christians to manifest their beliefs and moral values".

== National and regional differences ==
Levels of affiliation vary between different parts of the UK, particularly between Great Britain and Northern Ireland. In England, the proportion identifying as Christian fell sharply from 71.7% in 2001 to 46.3% in the 2021 census. Wales saw a similar drop, from 71.9% to 43.6%, while in Scotland it declined from 65.1% to 38.8% over the same period.

The decrease was less pronounced in Northern Ireland. Northern Ireland remains the most religious region in the United Kingdom with 79.7% of the population claiming Christian affiliation in 2021 Census. This marks a modest decline from 85.8% recorded in the 2001 Census, "No religion" has increased in membership. Religion has been seen as both a product and a cause of political divisions in Northern Ireland.

== Main religious leaders ==
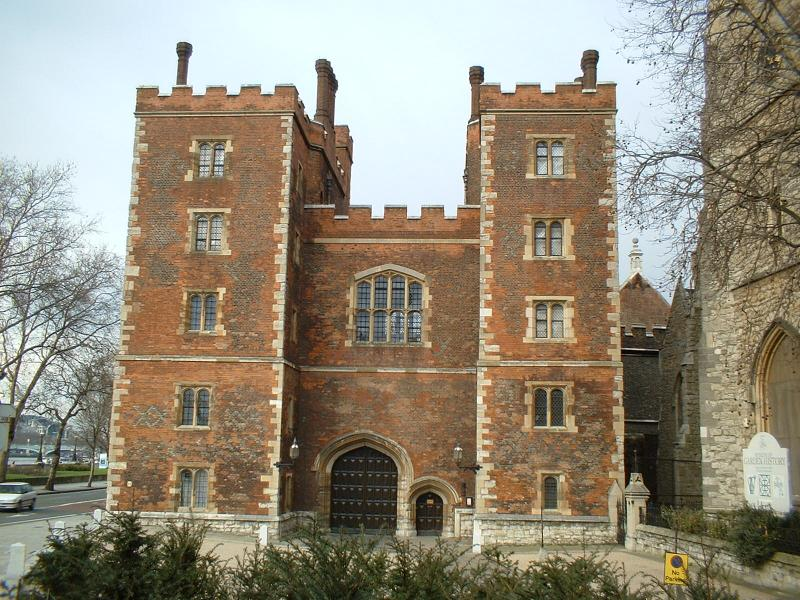
Lambeth Palace is the official residence of the Archbishop of Canterbury in London.

- The reigning Monarch is the supreme governor of the Church of England, with the Archbishops of Canterbury and York below them.
- The Moderator of the General Assembly of the Church of Scotland presides over the annual Assembly, but does not lead, the Church of Scotland.
- The Primus of Scotland is the presiding bishop of the Scottish Episcopal Church.
- The Great Imam is Sheikh Mawlana Abdul Qayum, who serves the largest Muslim congregation in Great Britain.
- The Archbishop of Westminster is the ex officio President of the Catholic Bishops' Conference of England and Wales.
- The de facto head of the Catholic Church in Scotland is the most senior archbishop, currently Leo Cushley, Archbishop of St Andrews and Edinburgh (see Bishops' Conference of Scotland).
- The Primate of All Ireland (of both the Church of Ireland and of the Catholic Church) exercises his ecclesiastical jurisdiction in Northern Ireland as well as the Republic of Ireland.
- The Archbishop of Wales is one of the six diocesan bishops of the Church in Wales, chosen from them by an electoral college comprising the bishops and other representatives. (The Archbishop retains his or her original diocese).
- The Chief Rabbi is the title of the leader of Orthodox Judaism in the Commonwealth.
- The Moderator of the General Assembly of the Presbyterian Church in Ireland presides over, but does not lead, the Church.
- The Chief Sangha Nayaka is the head of Theravada Buddhism in the UK, and representative of Buddhism at UK and Commonwealth Remembrance Day Ceremony and at the Commonwealth Day Ceremony at the Cenotaph and Royal Weddings and Funerals.
- The Church of Jesus Christ of Latter-day Saints is led by the Europe North Area Presidency. The current area president is Elder Kevin W. Pearson, with Elder Markos A. Aidukaitis and Elder Alan T. Phillips as first and second counsellors respectively.
- The Caliph Masih of the Ahmadiyya Community is Mirza Masroor Ahmad, and Fazl Mosque is his headquarters.

== Notable places of worship ==
Christian

- All Saints, London – Church of England
- Brompton Oratory – Catholic
- Canterbury Cathedral – Church of England and Mother Church of England
- Church of the Immaculate Conception – Catholic
- Durham Cathedral – Church of England
- Dormition Cathedral, London – Russian Orthodox
- Holy Trinity Cathedral, Down – Church of Ireland
- Essex Street Chapel – Unitarian
- Friends House – Quakers
- Glasgow Cathedral – Church of Scotland
- Greensted Church – Church of England
- Kingsway International Christian Centre – Charismatic
- London England Temple – Church of Jesus Christ of Latter-day Saints
- Metropolitan Tabernacle – Baptist
- Preston England Temple – Church of Jesus Christ of Latter-day Saints
- Rosslyn Hill Unitarian Chapel – Unitarian
- Salisbury Cathedral – Church of England
- St Anne's Cathedral, Belfast – Church of Ireland
- St David's Cathedral – Church in Wales
- St Dominic's Priory – Catholic
- St Giles' Cathedral, Edinburgh – Church of Scotland
- St Giles' Church, Cheadle – Catholic
- St Mark's, Kensington – Coptic
- St Mary's Cathedral, Edinburgh – Catholic
- St Mary's Cathedral, Edinburgh – Scottish Episcopal
- St Mary's Church, Warrington – Catholic
- St Lazar's Church, Bournville – Serbian Orthodox
- St Patrick's Cathedral, Armagh – Catholic
- St Patrick's Cathedral, Armagh – Church of Ireland
- St Paul's Cathedral – Church of England
- St Pancras Old Church – Church of England
- St Sarkis, Kensington – Armenian Apostolic
- St Sophia's Cathedral, London – Greek Orthodox
- Westminster Abbey – Church of England
- Westminster Cathedral – Catholic
- Westminster Central Hall – Methodist
- York Minster – Church of England

Islamic

- Baitul Futuh Mosque – Islamic
- East London Mosque- Islamic
- London Central Mosque – Islamic
- North London Central Mosque – Islamic

Hindu

- Shri Venkateswara (Balaji) Temple
- BAPS Shri Swaminarayan Mandir London (Neasden Temple)
- Bradford Lakshmi Narayan Hindu Temple

Buddhist

- London Buddhist Vihara
- Wat Buddhapadipa
- Amaravati Buddhist Monastery
- Kagyu Samye Ling Monastery and Tibetan Centre

Sikh

- Gurdwara Sri Guru Singh Sabha

Jewish

- Bevis Marks Synagogue – Jewish
- New West End Synagogue – Jewish

Pagan

- Stonehenge

== See also ==
- Disestablishmentarianism
- Religion in England
  - Religion in Victorian England
  - Religion in London
  - Religion in Birmingham
- Religion in Scotland
  - Sectarianism in Glasgow
- Religion in Wales
- Religion in Northern Ireland
- Religion in Jersey
- Segregation in Northern Ireland
- Commission on Religion and Belief in British Public Life
- Irreligion in the United Kingdom
- Divergence between Anglicanism and Methodism
