= Joseph Cooke =

English cleric (1775–1811)

- Born: 1775; Dudley, England
- Died: 1811 (aged 35–36); Rochdale, England
- Occupation: Minister

Rev. Joseph Cooke (1775–1811), a Free Christian, was expelled by the Wesleyan Methodists on doctrinal grounds and became the inspiration behind the Methodist Unitarian movement formed under the leadership of another former Wesleyan, Joseph Ashworth.

== Biography ==
Joseph Cooke was born near Dudley in the Black Country.

In 1795, Cooke entered the Methodist itinerancy. In 1803 he was appointed to the Wesleyan Methodist Chapel, Union Street, Rochdale, east Lancashire. During his ministry in the mill town he was rebuked by the Conference and transferred to Sunderland.

Whilst in the north-east, his supporters in Rochdale published two of his sermons on justification by faith. Later, during the 1806 Conference, he was expelled from the Wesleyan Methodists for preaching doctrines incompatible with Methodist beliefs. A significant proportion of the Union Street congregation supported their former minister and helped him to establish a brand-new chapel (The Providence Chapel, High Street) in Rochdale. Cooke ministered in the chapel and the surrounding districts until his death in 1811. At the time of Cooke's premature demise there were more than 1,000 'Cookites', organised around 16 'preaching-stations' and served by 18 preachers.

== Methodist Unitarians ==
After Cooke's death, Providence Chapel building in Rochdale was sold to a Congregationalist group.

Like many English General Baptists, the Cookites throughout east Lancashire were persuaded by Richard Wright (1765–1836), 'the Unitarian missionary', to make common cause with their liberal Christian counterparts within Unitarianism. In Rochdale, led by James Wilkinson, the Cookites, or 'Methodist Unitarians' as they soon became known, erected a new chapel in Clover Street in 1818. The chapel soon became known locally as the 'Co-op chapel' "because Wilkinson and at least nine of the original co-operators worshipped there". (This Methodist Unitarian link to the early labour movement continued. For example, both James Taylor and James Mills, the Rochdale and the Oldham delegates to the first Chartist convention in 1839, were Methodist Unitarians).

In 1890, the Clover Street Chapel congregation merged with the much older (seventeenth century) Unitarian meeting, Blackwater Street, and remains active today as part of the General Assembly of Unitarian and Free Christian Churches.

== Unitarian organizations ==
In 1915, the Unitarian Historical Society was founded. It encourages and supports the study of Unitarian history and that of its constituent and related traditions, including the Methodist Unitarian movement inspired by Joseph Cooke.

The Unitarian Christian Association was founded in 1991. One of its aims is to promote Unitarian Christian religion in the congregations of the General Assembly of Unitarian and Free Christian Churches. This is an aim that Cooke himself would have approved of.
