= Free Christians =

Free Christians may refer to:

- Nondenominational Christianity, autonomous local churches (congregations)
- various local movements, notably including:
  - Free Christians (Britain), individuals and local churches within the General Assembly of Unitarian and Free Christian Churches

== See also ==
- Free church
