= General Assembly of Unitarian and Free Christian Churches =

UK Unitarian church general Assembly

- The official logo of the GAUFCC, based upon the flaming chalice motif
- Abbreviation: GAUFCC
- Classification: Nontrinitarian, Protestant
- Orientation: Unitarianism, Free Christian, Liberal religion
- Associations: International Council of Unitarians and Universalists, European Liberal Protestant Network
- Region: United Kingdom
- Headquarters: Essex Hall in central London, United Kingdom
- Origin: 1928
- Congregations: 170
- Official website: www.unitarian.org.uk

The General Assembly of Unitarian and Free Christian Churches (GAUFCC or colloquially British Unitarians) is the umbrella organisation for Unitarian, Free Christians, and other liberal religious congregations in the United Kingdom and Ireland. It was formed in 1928, with denominational roots going back to the Great Ejection of 1662. Its headquarters is Essex Hall in central London, on the site of the first avowedly Unitarian chapel in England, set up in 1774.

The GAUFCC brought together various strands and traditions besides Unitarianism, including English Presbyterianism, General Baptist, Methodism, Liberal Christianity, Christian Universalism, Religious Humanism, and Unitarian Universalism. Unitarians are now an open-faith community celebrating diverse beliefs; some of its members would describe themselves as Buddhists, Pagans, or Jewish, while many others are humanists, agnostics, or atheists.

== History ==
=== Early Modern Britain ===
Christopher Hill states that ideas such as anti-Trinitarianism, which scholars trace back to ancient times, were an integral part of "the lower-class heretical culture which burst into the open in the 16th century". The cornerstones of this culture were anti-clericalism (opposition to the power of the Church) and a strong emphasis on biblical study, but there were specific heretical doctrines that had "an uncanny persistence". In addition to anti-Trinitarianism, there was a rejection of predestination and an embrace of millenarianism, mortalism, and hermeticism. Such ideas became "commonplace to 17th century ... Levellers, Diggers, Seekers, ... early Quakers and other radical groupings which took part in the free-for-all discussions of the English Revolution".

After the restoration of the Stuart monarchy and the resulting Act of Uniformity 1662, about 2,000 ministers left the established Church of England (the Great Ejection). Following the Act of Toleration 1689, many of these ministers preached in non-conforming congregations. The modern Unitarian denomination's origins lay within this group of Protestants, the English Presbyterians, who were reluctant to become Dissenters. However, by the late 18th century, the influx of some liberal, Unitarian General Baptists of the General Assembly of General Baptists to the denomination, with roots to the 17th century Caffynite Controversy, established a direct lineage to this milieu—although by now, much of the heretical culture stigma no longer existed.

=== 19th century ===
Until the passing of the Unitarian Relief Act in 1813, it was a criminal offence to deny the doctrine of the Trinity. By 1825 a new body, the British and Foreign Unitarian Association, itself an amalgamation of three previous societies, was set up to co-ordinate denominational activities. However, there was a setback in 1837 when "the Presbyterian/Unitarian members were forced to withdraw from the General Body of Protestant Ministers which, for over a century, had represented the joint interests of the old established nonconformist groups in and around London".

Around this time Presbyterian / Unitarian opinion was once again divided about how far the denomination should be associated with the label 'Unitarian'. James Martineau, a Presbyterian minister formerly based in Liverpool, pleaded for a 'warmer' religion than the 'critical, cold and untrusting' Unitarianism of his day. In 1881 he helped to found the National Conference of Unitarian, Liberal Christian, Free Christian, Presbyterian and other Non-Subscribing or Kindred Congregations—"a triumph, one might say, of Victorian verbosity. But the length of the name reflected the breadth of Martineau's vision".

Thus, from 1881 to the establishment of the GAUFCC, the denomination consisted of "two overlapping circles, one labelled 'Unitarian' and eager for organisation and propaganda, the other rejecting labels and treasuring comprehensiveness. Each side had its own college, its own newspaper and its own hymn book".

== Present day ==
By 1928 these two "overlapping circles" had been reconciled in the same organisation: the GAUFCC. Over time the organisation has come to embrace a wider theological and philosophical diversity. "At one extreme are the 'Free Christians' who wish to remain part of the Church Universal; at the other are those who wish to move beyond Christianity.

The congregations of GAUFCC contain members who hold diverse opinions. Unitarians are able to embrace and gain insights from the great world religions, philosophies, arts and modern sciences. The Unitarian Church does not follow one particular set of rules; owing to this, most Protestant denominations and Catholic dioceses do not recognise the baptisms or marriages it performs.

The official name is used on formal occasions, but in general use the organisation refers to itself and its members simply as Unitarian; the website URL is unitarian.org.uk, and the BBC religion page reflects this. The denomination supports same sex marriage.

== Member churches ==
Many churches are architecturally significant and are listed buildings, often in the style known as Dissenting Gothic. Other churches have made a mark on public life, with historically significant members of the congregation or ministers. Either of these types may have a Wikipedia article.

=== Current churches ===
The General Assembly counts about 182 churches as members, including:

- Billingshurst Unitarian Chapel, 1754, West Sussex
- Brighton Unitarian Church, 1820, built by Amon Henry Wilds
- Brixton Unitarian Church
- Brook Street Chapel, Knutsford, Cheshire
- Brookfield Unitarian Church, Gorton, Manchester
- Bury Unitarian Church, in Bury, Greater Manchester
- Chowbent Chapel, in Atherton, Greater Manchester
- Cross Street Chapel, Manchester
- Cambridge Unitarian Church (Memorial Church), Cambridgeshire
- Croydon Unitarian Church
- Dean Row Chapel, Wilmslow, Cheshire
- Essex Church, the first Unitarian church in England, moved in 1880s from central London to Kensington
- Flowergate Old Chapel, in Whitby
- Frenchay Chapel, Frenchay Common, Frenchay Bristol
- Fulwood Old Chapel, in Sheffield
- Gellionnen Chapel, near Swansea
- Great Meeting Unitarian Chapel, Leicester
- Hastings Unitarian Church
- Horsham Unitarian Church
- Kendal Unitarian Chapel, Cumbria
- King Edward Street Chapel, Macclesfield, Cheshire
- Meadrow Unitarian Chapel, Godalming
- Mill Hill Chapel, on Leeds City Square
- New Chapel, Denton
- Unitarian Meeting House, Newcastle-under-Lyme, Staffordshire
- Newington Green Unitarian Church, North London
- Norcliffe Chapel, Styal, Cheshire
- Nottage General Baptist & Unitarian Church near Porthcawl
- Octagon Chapel, Norwich
- Richmond and Putney Unitarian Church
- Rivington Unitarian Chapel, in Lancashire
- Rosslyn Hill Unitarian Chapel, Hampstead, North London; one of the biggest congregations nationally
- Shrewsbury Unitarian Church
- Taunton Unitarian Chapel
- Todmorden Unitarian Church, in West Yorkshire
- Toxteth Unitarian Chapel, in Liverpool
- UMB (Unitarian Meeting Bristol) Brunswick Square, Cabot Circus, Bristol City Centre, Bristol
- Underbank Chapel, Sheffield
- Ullet Road Unitarian Church, Liverpool
- Unitarian Meeting House, Ipswich
- Upper Chapel, Sheffield
- Westgate Unitarian Chapel, Wakefield
- York Unitarian Chapel

=== Previous churches ===
Some Unitarian church buildings are now used for other purposes:

- Wallasey Memorial Unitarian Church, on the Wirral Peninsula, now under the care of the Historic Chapels Trust
- Upper Brook Street Chapel, Manchester, as of 2017 student accommodation
- Lewin's Mead Unitarian meeting house in Bristol, converted to offices in 1987
- New Meeting House, Moor Street, Birmingham, (rebuilt after the Priestley Riots burned down the old one), since 1862 St Michael's Catholic Church
- High Pavement Chapel, Nottingham, now a pub
- Platt Chapel, in Fallowfield, Manchester

Other church buildings have gone, but their congregations moved or merged with neighbours:

- Church of the Saviour, Birmingham, which launched the political career of Joseph Chamberlain
- Church of the Messiah, Birmingham, built over a canal
- Hope Street Unitarian Chapel, halfway between the Anglican and Catholic Cathedrals of Liverpool; demolished 1962
- Octagon Chapel, Liverpool
- Renshaw Street Unitarian Chapel, Liverpool

=== Those mentioned in articles ===
The following place articles mention the presence of their Unitarian churches:

- Belper, Derbyshire (1788)
- Bessels Green, in Sevenoaks, Kent
- Crewkerne, in Somerset
- Gateacre, Liverpool (1700)
- Little Horton, in Bradford
- Monton Unitarian Church in Eccles, Greater Manchester
  - Grade II* listed buildings in Greater Manchester lists Brookfield, Monton, and Chowbent
- Stalybridge, near Manchester
- Trim Street, Bath, 1795
- Westgate Chapel, in Lewes, East Sussex

== Affiliations ==
The British Unitarians are a member of the International Council of Unitarians and Universalists and of the European Liberal Protestant Network. The Non-subscribing Presbyterian Church of Ireland maintains an Accord with the GAUFCC.

In addition to the approximately 170 congregations that are affiliated with the General Assembly, there are also groups within it. Some of these represent interests (history, music, international development, etc.), while others are of religious beliefs, most notably the Unitarian Christian Association and the Unitarian Earth Spirit Network.

== Officers ==
The national structure of British Unitarians is headed by an elected president, who holds office for one year. This officer is the figurehead leader of the organisation. Day-to-day administration is in the hands of an Executive Committee, which is led by a Convenor, assisted by an Honorary Treasurer, a General Secretary (sometimes called Chief Officer), and other Executive Committee members.

At the regional level, British Unitarianism is grouped into Districts. There are currently 13 Districts in England, two in Wales, and one in Scotland. Each District has a similar structure to that at national level, with a President and a District Executive Committee. Some Districts appoint a District Minister.

Local congregations vary in size, structure, and practice, but there is a requirement for each congregation to have some form of established and formal leadership. In most cases this will include a local Council and usually also a Unitarian minister.

== Notable British Unitarians ==
- Sir Tim Berners Lee, inventor of the World Wide Web
- Sir John Brunner, businessman (ICI), politician and great-grandfather of the Duchess of Kent
- Austen Chamberlain, Nobel Peace Prize winner
- Joseph Chamberlain, businessman (GKN), politician and statesman
- Neville Chamberlain, prime minister
- Sir Philip Colfox, politician
- James Chuter Ede, politician, Home Secretary
- Elizabeth Gaskell, novelist
- the Lupton family of Leeds, prosperous merchants and civic leaders
- John Sutton Nettlefold, industrialist
- Sir Isaac Newton, physicist
- Joseph Priestley, chemist and Unitarian clergyman
- Harriet Taylor Mill, philosopher
- Andrew Pritchard, microscope maker
- Cyril Smith, member of parliament and alleged serial sex offender
- Mary Wollstonecraft, feminist

== See also ==
- Rev. Joseph Cooke, the inspiration behind Methodist Unitarianism
- Bartholomew Legate, the inspiration behind the Seekers
- List of Unitarian, Universalist, and Unitarian Universalist churches
- Religion in the United Kingdom
- Edward Wightman
