= Richmond and Putney Unitarian Church =

Church in Richmond, London, England

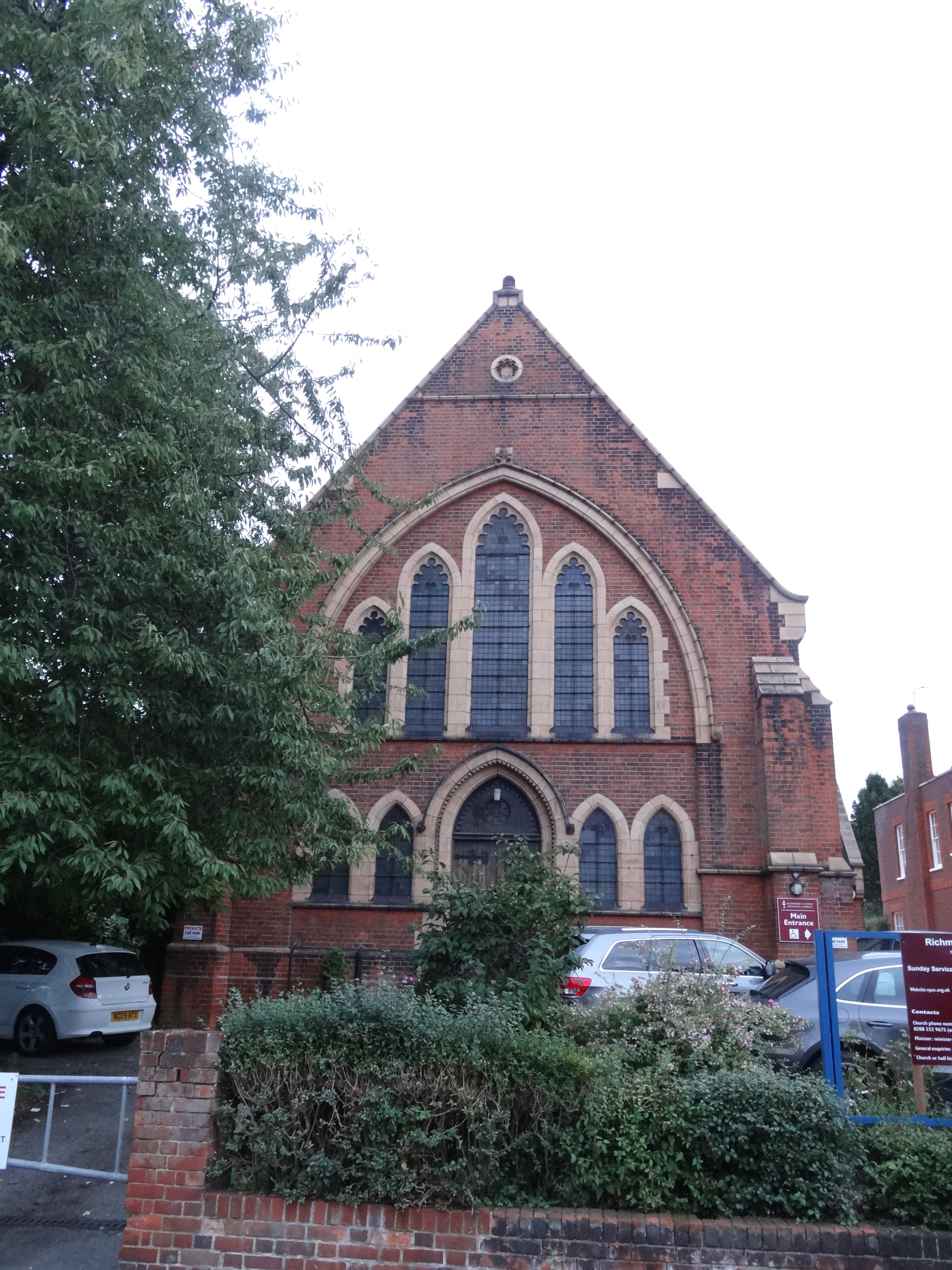
- Richmond and Putney Unitarian Church
- 51°27′30.6″N 0°18′14.3″W
- Location: Richmond & Putney Unitarian & Free Christian Church, Ormond Road, Richmond, Surrey, TW10 6TH, UK
- Country: England
- Denomination: Unitarianism
- Website: www.rpuc.org.uk

Architecture
- Architect: T Locke Worthington
- Years built: 1896

Richmond and Putney Unitarian Church is a Unitarian church in Ormond Road, Richmond, London.

The church building, dating from 1896 and designed by the architect T Locke Worthington, includes an apse with five stained glass lancers, dating from 1912, by Morris & Co. A rear extension designed by Kenneth Tayler was opened in 1966. The Putney congregation merged into the Richmond congregation in 1985.

The Putney Unitarian Church congregation had met at the Wandsworth Unitarian Church, which was expropriated in 1967 for a road-widening project. Their new church on the Upper Richmond Road opened in 1968. After the Putney congregation combined with Richmond, that building, also designed by Kenneth Tayler, was sold to the All Saints Liberal Catholic Church.

== Photographs ==
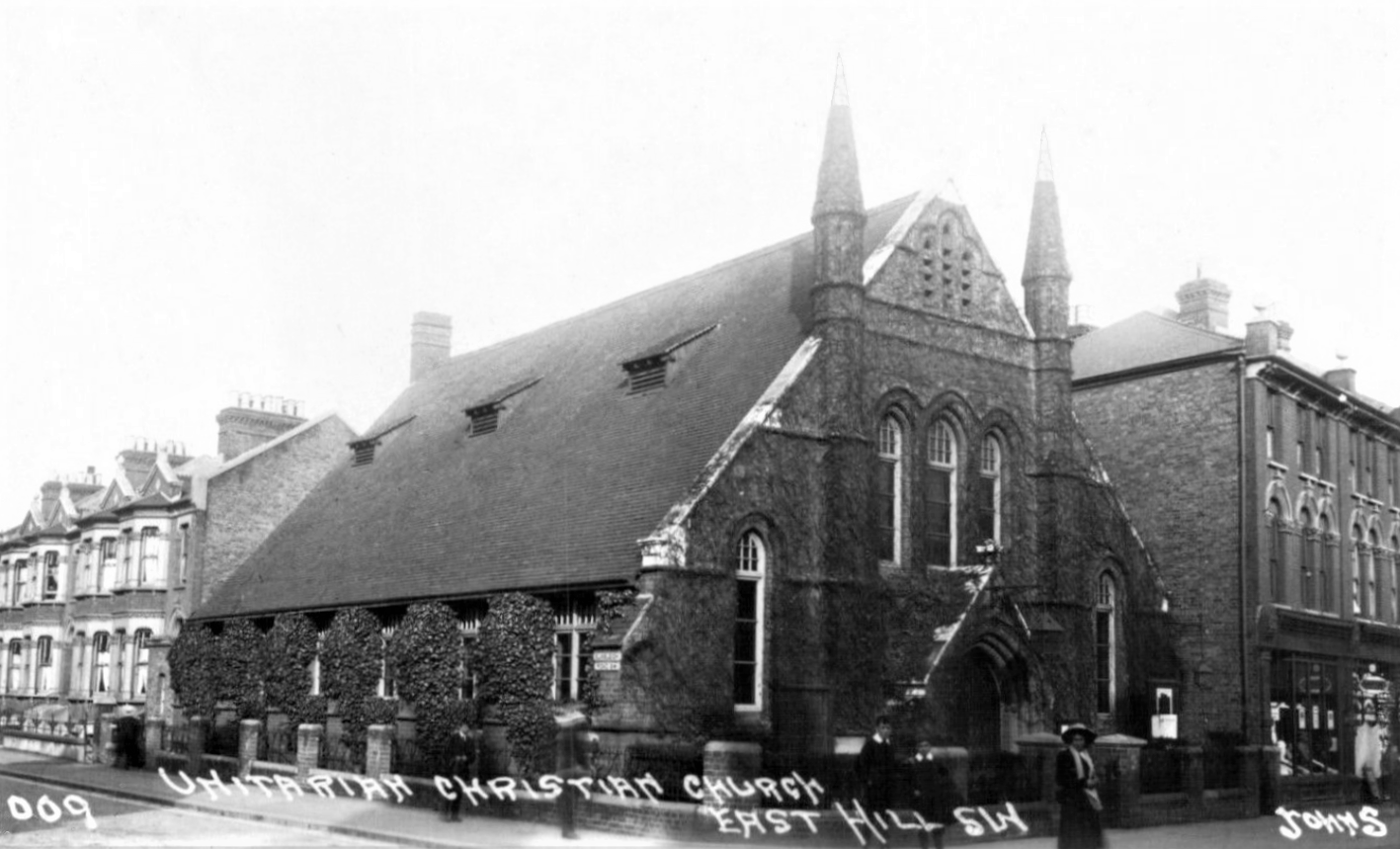
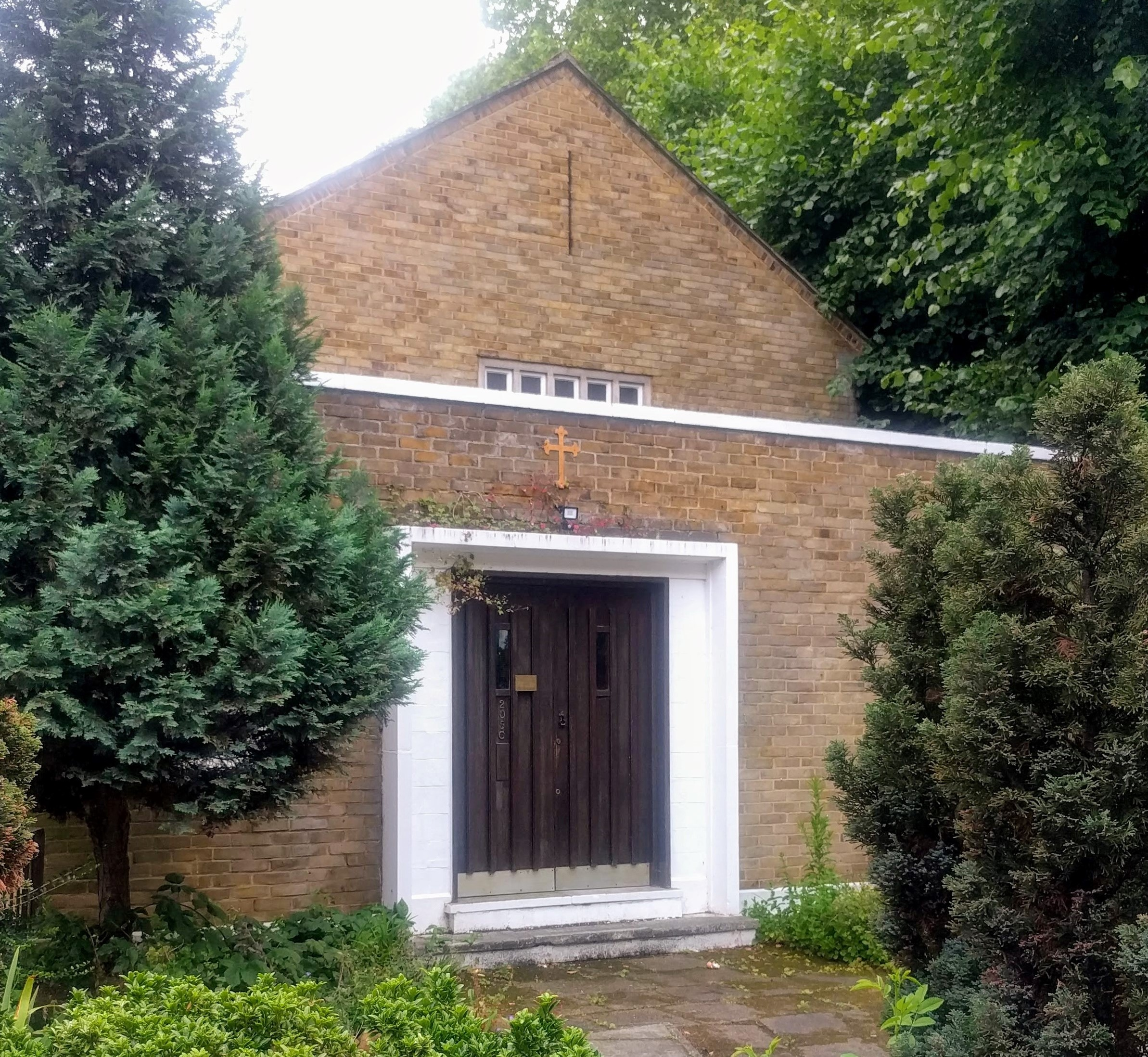
Wandsworth Unitarian Church on East Hill (above left) was demolished in 1967 when the congregation moved to a new building in Upper Richmond Road, Putney (above right). This building was sold and became a Liberal Catholic Church when Putney Unitarians combined with Richmond in 1985.
