= Unitarian Christian Association =

- The official logo of the UCA featuring a Christian cross
- Abbreviation: UCA
- Formation: 1991
- Type: Religious organisation
- Location: United Kingdom
- Official language: English
- Moderator: Revd Jean Bradley
- Key people: Dr Brian Hick (Editor of The Liberal Christian Herald), Mrs Denise Birks (Secretary)
- Affiliations: General Assembly of Unitarian and Free Christian Churches, European Liberal Protestant Network
- Website: unitarianchristian.org.uk

The Unitarian Christian Association (UCA) is a fellowship of Christians who feel an affinity with traditional Unitarianism and Free Christianity. The association is based in the United Kingdom and is an affiliated society of the General Assembly of Unitarian and Free Christian Churches, and has formal links with the European Liberal Protestant Network.

The UCA also has fraternal relations with European groups such as the Assemblée Fraternelle des Chrétiens Unitariens (AFCU) and Congregazione Italiana Cristiana Unitariana, along with North American groups such as the Unitarian Universalist Christian Fellowship and American Unitarian Conference.

As such, the UCA should be considered to be part of three Christian subcultures—the distinct traditions of Unitarianism and Free Christianity, and the broader 'umbrella movement' of liberal Christianity.

== Theology ==
The Unitarian Christian Association, as its name suggests, exists primarily to preserve and celebrate Unitarian Christianity.

In short, the Unitarian Christian tradition is founded on a theological position (originally espoused by Michael Servetus and Francis David) that dissents from the doctrine of the Trinity instead affirming the unity of God and placing emphasis on the humanity of Jesus whilst at the same time recognising the divinity of Jesus. This strict monotheism is arguably more akin to Islamic and Jewish positions than the positions of larger Christian groups such as the Roman Catholic Church—and as a result, they may be regarded by some fellow Christians as 'unorthodox' or 'heretical'.

In tandem with their aim to promote Unitarian Christian beliefs, the UCA also maintains an ethos of theological open-mindedness and inclusivity shaped by its links with the Free Christian tradition. This is highlighted by the UCA's Foundational Declaration (Recast Edition) which states the following:

The Bible is central to our faith and Jesus is the Teacher, Exemplar and Master. We will read and search scripture for truth, interpreted by the authority of Conscience. All creeds and confessions restrict belief and the free Inquiry we need for Knowledge. By loving one another, we show ourselves to follow the example of the Jesus. In all things, in faith and deeds, we seek to follow the [sic] His Great Commandment that God is One and we should love God with all that we are, and love neighbour as ourselves. We know that how we act is much more important than what [sic] the words we say and that, in all times, the words of Jesus still show the way, more important than those uttered in later days. Unity is found not in creeds or doctrines, but by following and being obedient to His teachings. This we affirm.

== History ==
The UCA was formed in 1991, largely at the instigation of scholar and minister Lancelot Austin Garrard (1904–1993), as a response to theological revisionism within the General Assembly of Unitarian and Free Christian Churches.

The founders of the Unitarian Christian Association sought to uphold the original Unitarian Christian tradition of Francis David within the British Unitarian movement. The aims of the UCA were:

to promote Unitarian Christian religion in the congregations of the General Assembly of Unitarian and Free Christian Churches, to promote religious education within that tradition, to relieve need, hardship or distress of members of the Association, and to undertake any other charitable purpose that may arise.

They sought to achieve these aims through working together on explicitly Unitarian Christian publications such as The Herald (a journal published every quarter), contributions to Hymns of Faith and Freedom (a Unitarian hymn book), and through the holding of explicitly Unitarian Christian meetings, lectures and services within churches affiliated with the General Assembly of Unitarian and Free Christian Churches.

In its early years, the members of the UCA decided that they did not wish to apply for recognition as an official body affiliated to the General Assembly. But after the GA adopted new aims and objects which specifically included "the upholding of the liberal Christian tradition," it was agreed that it would be appropriate to apply for recognition. The Unitarian Christian Association became an Affiliated Society in April 2002.

Despite the clear friendship and warmth between Unitarian Christians and non-Christian Unitarians in the UK, there have been a series of debates within the Association and wider denomination—sometimes heated—over the future of Unitarian Christianity in the United Kingdom, and the UCA's role in its preservation and continued development.

In Spring 2006, a theological colloquium was held at Cambridge University by UCA members in order to discuss the future of Unitarianism and Free Christianity within Britain. Following this, UCA representatives met with representatives from the Assemblée Fraternelle des Chrétiens Unitariens (AFCU) and Congregazione Italiana Cristiano Unitariana to discuss the future of Unitarian Christianity on a wider international level. From this meeting the Avignon Manifesto—a joint declaration of intent—was created and published for their members to individually ratify. The document affirmed their distinct identity as Unitarian Christians whilst signalling their intent to remain within the wider Unitarian and Free Christian traditions.

A similar body on the island of Ireland, the Non-subscribing Presbyterian Church of Ireland, was affiliated with the UCA until 2015. The NSPCI's Synod of Munster includes two congregations in the Republic of Ireland, which constitute the Unitarian Church in Ireland.

== See also ==
- Non-subscribing Presbyterian Church of Ireland
- Christian Unitarianism
- Liberal Christians
