= Free Christians (Britain) =

In Britain, the term Free Christian refers specifically to individual members and whole congregations within the General Assembly of Unitarian and Free Christian Churches.

These Free Christians do not subscribe to any official doctrines or creeds, as found in other churches. Because of their historical connections with Unitarianism, they are known particularly for allowing dissent from Trinitarian doctrine (the belief that God exists as a Trinity). However, these Free Christian groups also welcome people who adhere to more orthodox beliefs, as the emphasis is on theological inclusivity rather than non-conformity per se.

== History ==
In Britain the term "Free Christian" can be traced back to the ministry of James Martineau in the late 19th century. Martineau was an advocate of theological inclusivity, arguing that explicitly Unitarian churches would lead to "a different doxy" from orthodoxy. He urged churches within the Unitarian denomination not to use the name "Unitarian," and suggested "Free Christian" as a more inclusive alternative. In 1868 he went further, forming the Free Christian Union, which he hoped would unite Christians of various beliefs who were opposed to officially imposed doctrine or creeds.

== Today ==
In today's Britain, Free Christians are aligned denominationally within the ranks of the General Assembly of Unitarian and Free Christian Churches, and more specifically, the Unitarian Christian Association.

The leadership of the Church is made up of Professional Ministers and Accredited Lay Preachers.

In Ireland, similar congregations are called "Non-Subscribing Presbyterians". The Non-subscribing Presbyterian Church of Ireland, an independent denomination in its own right, no longer has any institutional link with the GAUFCC and UCA (the NSPCI disaffiliated from the UCA in 2015); although some NSPCI ministers trained through their theological and ministry training colleges. They would also consider themselves to have a shared heritage. As such, they could be viewed as connected to the same 'Free Christian' current, at least in historical terms. The NSPCI retains a non-creedal, Christian identity.

== See also ==
- Liberal Christianity
- Nondenominational Christianity
- Radical Reformation
- Progressive Christianity
