= Billingshurst Unitarian Chapel =

Church in West Sussex, England

Billingshurst Unitarian Chapel (Known as 'The Chapel').
- Billingshurst Unitarian and Free Christian Church
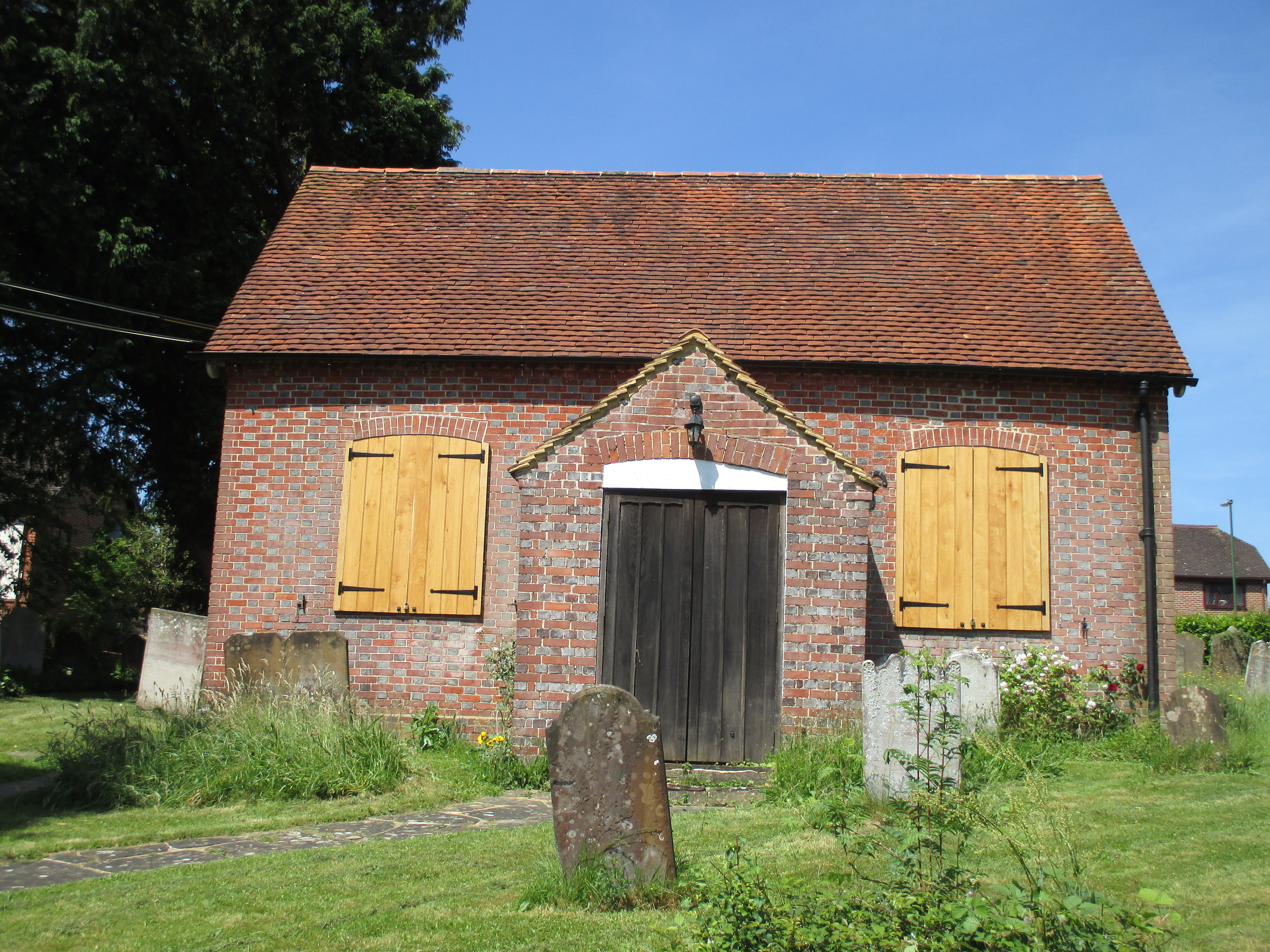
- The chapel from the east

- Location of the chapel within West Sussex
- 51.0218°N 0.4530°W
- Location: High Street, Billingshurst, West Sussex RH14 9QS
- Country: England
- Denomination: General Assembly of Unitarian and Free Christian Churches (British Unitarians)
- Previous denomination: General Baptist
- Website: www.thechapelatbillingshurst.com

History
- Former name: Billingshurst General Baptist Chapel
- Status: Chapel
- Founded: 1754
- Founder(s): William Evershed and William Turner

Architecture
- Functional status: Active
- Heritage designation: Grade II
- Designated: 22 September 1959
- Style: Georgian Vernacular
- Groundbreaking: 1754

Billingshurst Unitarian Chapel is a place of worship in Billingshurst in the English county of West Sussex. The cottage-like building was erected in 1754 for General Baptists, hence its original name of the Billingshurst General Baptist Chapel, but the congregation moved towards Unitarian beliefs in the 19th century, and still maintain these. It is a member of General Assembly of Unitarian and Free Christian Churches, the umbrella body for British Unitarians.

The chapel, also known as the Billingshurst Unitarian and Free Christian Church, is one of the oldest Nonconformist places of worship in the district of Horsham—an area in which such Christian beliefs have a long and successful history; furthermore, there are few older chapels of this type anywhere in southeast England. English Heritage has listed the chapel at Grade II for its architectural and historical importance.

== History ==
=== From General Baptists ===
In England, people and ministers who worshipped outside the Church of England but were not part of the Roman Catholic Church were historically known as Dissenters or (Protestant) Nonconformists. Nonconformism became officially recognised after the Act of Uniformity 1662, which removed from their living those Church of England ministers who refused to recognise or abide by the Act's requirements. Many alternative denominations developed, all focused on a person's personal relationship with God rather than on the rites and ceremonies of religious worship as in the Anglican and Roman Catholic churches. This trend was seen throughout Sussex, and by the late 17th century "the all-embracing medieval Church" existed alongside dozens of newly established groups and denominations.

One of these sects was the General Baptists. Along with the Religious Society of Friends (Quakers) and the Presbyterians, they found significant early success in the area around the north Sussex market town of Horsham. By 1676 there were about 100 Nonconformists in the town, and the General Baptist cause was led by local radical and evangelist Matthew Caffyn. Under his guidance a General Baptist chapel was founded in the town in 1719, bringing together Baptists who had met in small house-groups since 1669 or possibly as early as 1645.

=== Billingshurst itself ===
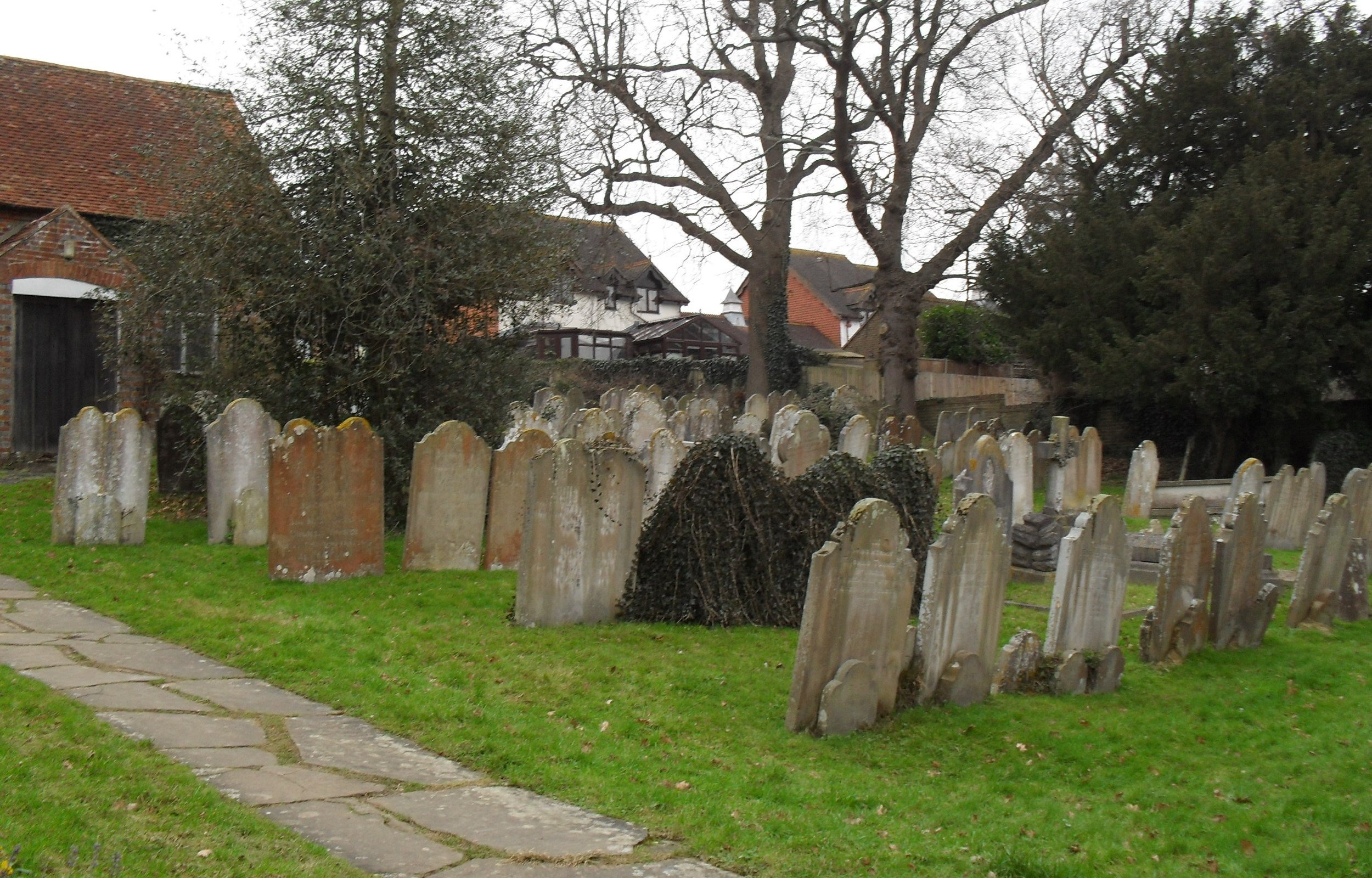
The chapel has a large graveyard to the front and side.

Worshippers from across northern Sussex came to this chapel; many were from the village of Billingshurst a few miles away. This group later became large enough to split from the Horsham congregation and establish a chapel in their home village. They chose a grassy, raised site set back from the west side of the High Street, and erected a modest cottage-like chapel in 1754. (Note: The Victoria County History of Sussex (1986) states, in relation to the Horsham chapel, that "...the Billingshurst members formed a separate congregation c. 1818". According to Stell (2002), this is in fact the date when the congregation became independent of Horsham following a membership dispute.) The founders were William Turner and William Evershed, whose initials are recorded on a dated stone tablet inside. Evershed was a General Baptist preacher at Horsham who moved to a farm in Billingshurst in 1742; together with Turner he held and preached at small meetings in Billingshurst. The Evershed family maintained a 260 year connection with the chapel and more than 120 Eversheds of various generations, from William himself, to Susie Evershed, who died in August 2022, aged 90, are buried or commemorated in the graveyard, a "surprisingly big" area which surrounds the chapel and helps it "make a display in spite of itself" and its modest architecture. After making plans for a chapel in the village in 1753, Turner and Evershed bought the site for three guineas (£580 as of 2025). The chapel was registered for worship in October 1754; its date of founding makes it one of the oldest Nonconformist places of worship in both the Horsham district and the whole of southeast England.

The congregation, like that at Horsham, gradually moved from General Baptist beliefs towards Unitarianism in the early 19th century. The chapel took the name Billingshurst Free Christian Church and later the Billingshurst Unitarian Chapel or Billingshurst Unitarian and Free Christian Church.

William Evershed also had a house in Godalming, Surrey, at which conventicles attended by hundreds of people every week took place from the mid-18th century. In 1783 the congregation decided to build a meeting house, and a General Baptist chapel (which soon became Unitarian) was erected on Meadrow six years later. It is still in use as Meadrow Unitarian Chapel.

== Architecture and description ==
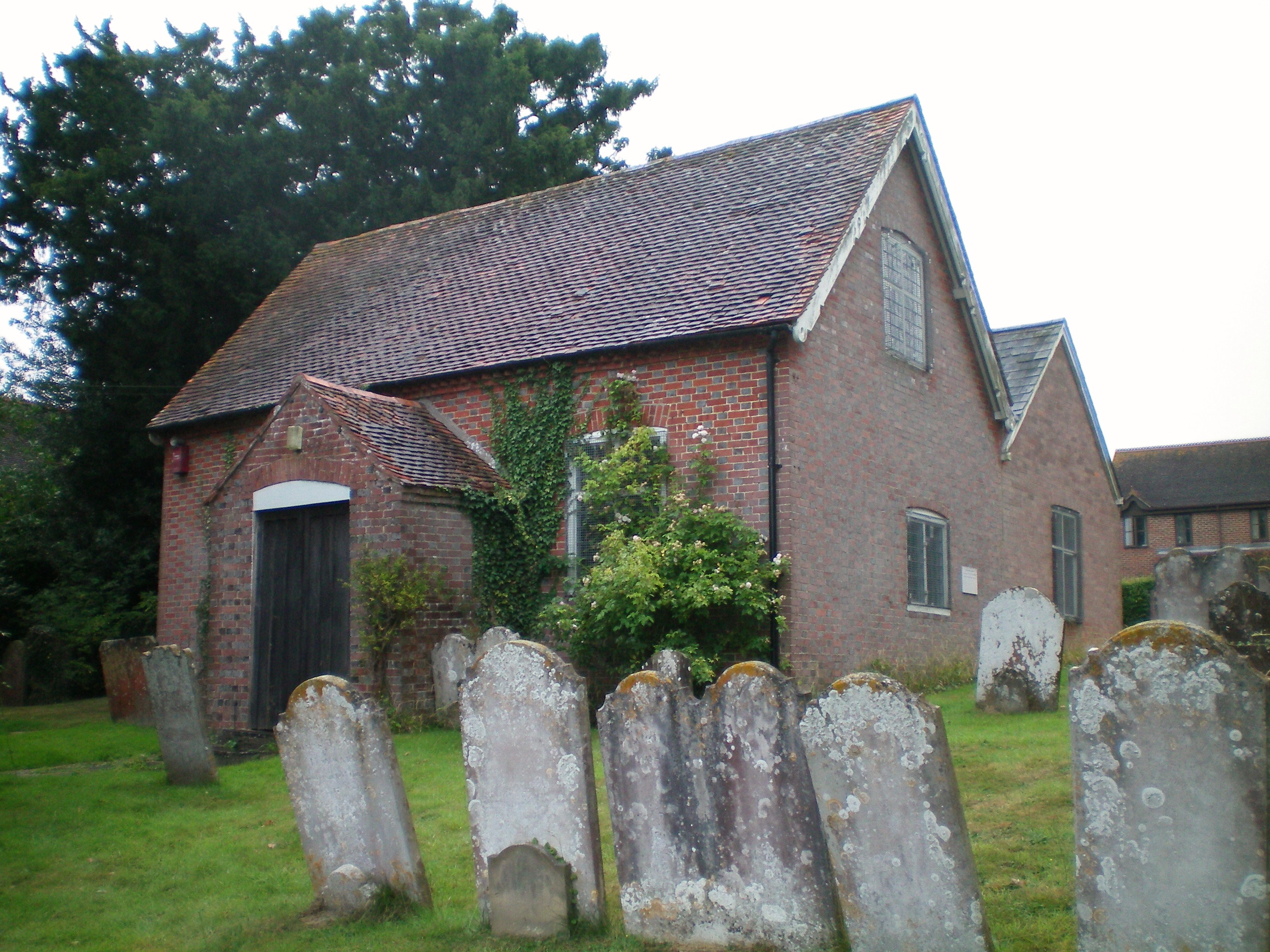
The chapel stands on an elevated knoll upon which modern housing has encroached.

Billingshurst Unitarian Chapel is a simple Georgian Vernacular building, "like a demure Georgian cottage". It is a single storey high and has a two-window range with a gable-headed porch between the casement windows. The wide façade of three bays has been described as similar to the former Southover General Baptist Chapel (now in residential use) in Lewes, East Sussex. The walls are of glazed grey and red brickwork laid in a Flemish bond pattern, and the roof is laid with tiles. Ian Nairn and Nikolaus Pevsner noted that "the architecture is utterly self-effacing". It is a good example of the contrast between the prominently sited, "wealthy established parish church with its centuries of tradition" and "the small impoverished Dissenting chapel", which occurs frequently in Sussex towns and villages. The east side of Billingshurst High Street is dominated by St Mary's Church, with its landmark steeple and elevated position, while "quietly hidden" behind iron fencing and hedges on the west side is the Unitarian Chapel. The site measures 40 square feet (3.7 m^{2}) and sits 8 feet (2.4 m) back from the High Street.

The interior measures 16 by 28 1/4 feet (4.9 m × 8.6 m). A modest wooden gallery, supported on one pillar and with a panelled front, spans the north end of the ceiling. Some original timber tie-beams remain on the ceiling. Other interior fittings include an "impressive" clock manufactured in 1756 by Inkpen of Horsham, two coffin stools—on which a coffin would be placed before it was lowered into the grave—dating from 1787 and inscribed ik 87 (James Knight, 1787), original pews including two carved with James Knight 1788, a brass chandelier with a dove figure, and an original communion table of oak.

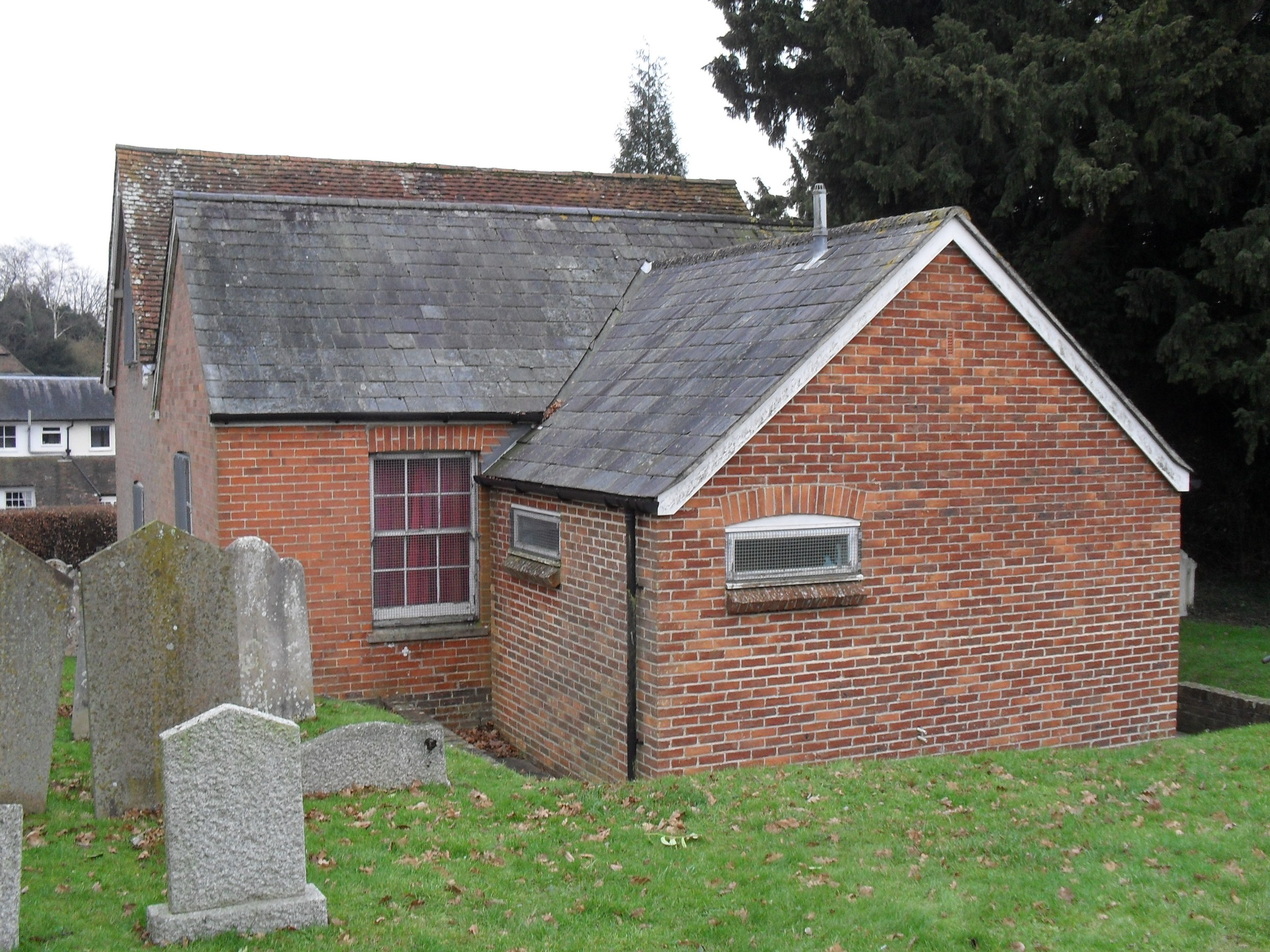
A baptistery and vestries were added to the rear (west) elevation in the 19th century.

Structural alterations were made at various times. The capacity was extended in the late 18th century when a wooden gallery was built; two named pews are dated 1788. A brick-built ground-floor extension dates from 1825, when rooms were built on the west side to house a baptistery and vestries. The baptistery was apparently roofless originally, but it was altered in 1880 or 1886 when it became a library and schoolroom. At the same time, the pulpit was moved from its original position near the entrance door to the wall on the south side, where it remains. The chapel is still set in the middle of its original graveyard, but modern housing development on the west side has come close to the boundaries, affecting the setting. The original approach from the east, along a small uneven path in a narrow gap between surrounding buildings (which almost hide the chapel from view from the High Street), survives.

The chapel was described in these terms by a 19th-century writer: (Note: Unattributed; quoted by Beevers, Marks & Roles (1989).)

A delightful plain rural chapel, with the men and women sitting on different sides, the deacons crouching around a table at [the] front of the pulpit, the singers in the gallery, the hymns introduced by the wail of a pitch pipe.

== The chapel today ==
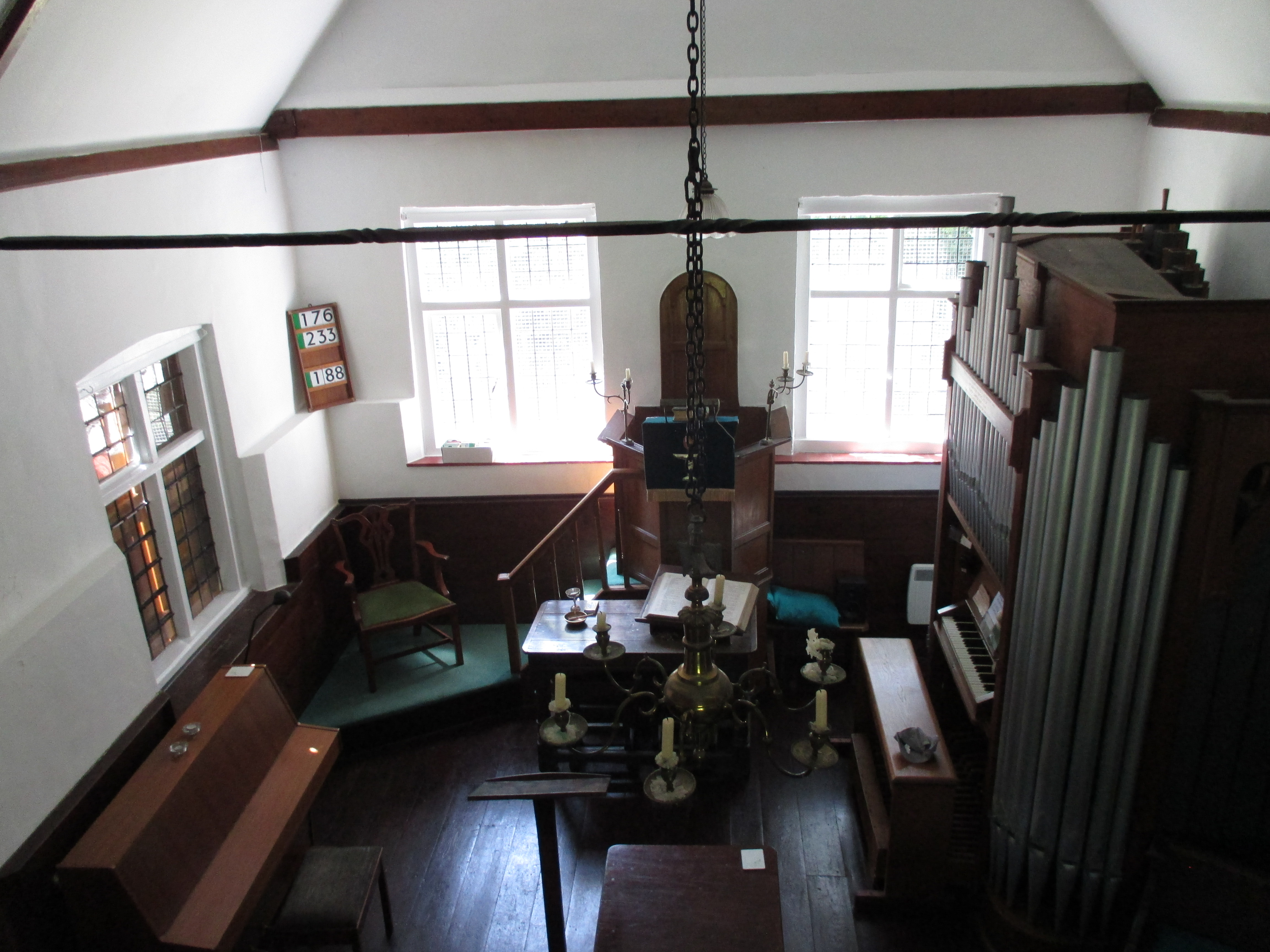
The interior seen from the gallery

Billingshurst Unitarian Chapel was listed at Grade II by English Heritage on 22 September 1959; this defines it as a "nationally important" building of "special interest As of February 2001, there were 1,628 Grade II listed buildings, and 1,726 listed buildings of all grades, in the district of Horsham.

The chapel is a member of the General Assembly of Unitarian and Free Christian Churches, the umbrella organisation for British Unitarians.

In 2012 the congregation set up "Evershed Arts", using the Old Library Room as an artspace to promote artistic expression in the local area.Between September 2014 and January 2015, the building was renovated, partly funded through English Heritage Lottery funding and partly through the fund raising efforts of the congregation. At this time, the congregation undertook a rebranding exercise and whilst it officially and constitutionally remains Billingshurst Unitarian Chapel, it is informally known as 'The Chapel.' Its website can be found at www.thechapelatbillingshurst.com.

== See also ==
- List of places of worship in Horsham (district)

== Bibliography ==
- Beevers, David; Marks, Richard; Roles, John (1989). Sussex Churches and Chapels. Brighton: The Royal Pavilion, Art Gallery and Museums. ISBN 0-948723-11-4.
- Elleray, D. Robert (2004). Sussex Places of Worship. Worthing: Optimus Books. ISBN 0-9533132-7-1.
- Hague, Graham; Hague, Judy (1986). The Unitarian Heritage: An Architectural Survey (PDF) (1st ed.). Sheffield: Unitarian Heritage. ISBN 0-9511081-0-7.
- Lines, Wendy (1995). Billingshurst. The Archive Photographs Series. Chalford: Chalford Publishing Company. ISBN 0-7524-0301-X.
- Lines, Wendy (2002). Images of England: Billingshurst and Wisborough Green. Stroud: Tempus Publishing. ISBN 0-7524-2482-3.
- Nairn, Ian; Pevsner, Nikolaus (1965). The Buildings of England: Sussex. Harmondsworth: Penguin Books. ISBN 0-14-071028-0.
- Stell, Christopher (2002). Nonconformist Chapels and Meeting-houses in Eastern England. Swindon: English Heritage. ISBN 1-873592-50-7.
- Stock, Peter (1999). Hidden Nonconformity: a study of Nonconformity in the Godalming area from the 17th century. Farnham: Arrow Press.
- Wales, Tony (1999). The West Sussex Village Book. Newbury: Countryside Books. ISBN 1-85306-581-1.
