= Listed buildings in Newby, Cumbria =

Newby is a civil parish in Westmorland and Furness, Cumbria, England. It contains 14 listed buildings that are recorded in the National Heritage List for England. Of these, two are listed at Grade II*, the middle of the three grades, and the others are at Grade II, the lowest grade. The parish includes the village of Newby and the surrounding countryside. Most of the listed buildings are houses and associated structures, farmhouses and farm buildings, the other listing buildings consisting of the walls and memorials of a Friends' burial ground.

== Key ==
Grade	Criteria
II*	Particularly important buildings of more than special interest
II	Buildings of national importance and special interest

== Buildings ==
Name and location	Photograph	Date	Notes	Grade
5 Cottage Row; 54.58491°N 2.63781°W	—	1675	A stone cottage in a row with a slate roof. There are two low storeys and two bays. The doorway has an architrave, and an ornate lintel containing initials, the date, two shields, and consoles at the ends. There is one sash window in each floor.	II
1–4 Cottage Row; 54.58496°N 2.63759°W	—	Late 17th century (probable)	A row of four cottages, Nos. 3 and 4 being the oldest, No. 2 dating probably from the late 18th to early 19th century, and No. 1 from later. They are in stone with quoins, a slate roof, and all have two storeys. Nos. 1, 2 and 4 have symmetrical three-bay fronts; No. 3 has two bays. The windows of No. 2 are casements, and the other houses have sash windows. All the openings have stone surrounds.	II
Brown Howe Farmhouse, barn and byres 54.56408°N 2.66334°W	—	Late 17th century (probable)	The farmhouse and outbuildings are in stone with quoins. They have two storeys and a total of nine bays. The house has a central porch and windows, one a horizontally-sliding sash, with stone surrounds. The byres to the right have doors, external steps, and a casement window, and the threshing barn to the left has a central wagon door.	II
Newby Hall and wall 54.58475°N 2.63517°W		1685	A large stone house that has a slate roof with stone copings, it has a U-shaped plan, consisting of a hall with cross-wings, and a canted outshut at the rear. There are two storeys, the hall has four bays, and each cross-wing has two. The central doorway has an architrave, and above it is a coat of arms under a cornice. The windows are mullioned in chamfered surrounds, and there are continuous hood moulds on both floors. In front of the house is a low retaining wall about 3 feet (0.91 m) high.	II*
Gatepiers and forecourt walls, Newby Hall; 54.58490°N 2.63520°W	—	1685	The walls enclosing the garden at the front of the hall are in stone and have flat copings with a moulded edge. The front wall is about 2.5 feet (0.76 m) high, and contains gate piers about 10 feet (3.0 m) high. The piers are square and each has a fluted cap, a cornice, and a ball finial with gadrooned decoration. The side walls are about 8 feet (2.4 m) high, and each contains a doorway. The east doorway has a chamfered surround and an ornate initialled and dated lintel, and the west doorway has a chamfered lintel. In the west wall are two bee boles.	II
Memorial to Thomas Lawson and shelter 54.58690°N 2.64337°W	—	1691	The memorial commemorates the botanist Thomas Lawson. It consists of the top of a table tomb re-set against the wall of a Friends' burial ground in a small lean-to shelter. The slab is about 4 feet (1.2 m) long by about 2.5 feet (0.76 m) wide, and carries an inscription in Latin.	II*
Hillside House; 54.58507°N 2.63388°W	—	1692	A pebbledashed house that has a slate roof with stone coped gables. There are two storeys, four bays, and a rear outshut. The doorway has an architrave, an initialled and dated lintel, and a cornice, and the windows are horizontally-sliding sashes.	II
White Stone Cottage and stable 54.57378°N 2.65333°W	—	Late 17th to early 18th century (probable)	The cottage and stable are in stone with quoins and moulded eaves, and have a slate roof with a ball finial on the stable. There are two storeys, the house has cellars and three bays, and the stable to the right has a single bay. In the centre of the house is a doorway, there is one mullioned window, and the other windows are casements. The stable has a doorway with a four-centred head and casement windows. All the openings have stone surrounds.	II
Thorney Croft Farmhouse, barn and byres 54.57902°N 2.65010°W	—	Early 18th century	The farmhouse and outbuildings are in stone with quoins and a slate roof. There are two storeys, a total of eleven bays, and two wings at the rear of the house. The house has been extended by one bay into the barn. In the original part of the house is one mullioned window, the others being casements, and in the added bay is a porch and a sash window. The barn to the right of the house has a central wagon entrance, doors, windows and a loft door, and the byre to the left has plank doors and external steps.	II
South View; 54.58487°N 2.63795°W	—	18th century (probable)	A cottage and barn at the end of Cottage Row, they are in stone with a slate roof, and the cottage has been extended into the barn. There are two low storeys, the cottage has four bays, and there are seven bays overall. The cottage has a porch and horizontally-sliding sash windows. In the barn is a segment-headed wagon door and a small casement window, and to the left is a projecting outshut with external steps.	II
Peartree House; 54.58566°N 2.63173°W	—	Early to mid 19th century	A stone house with rusticated quoins and a slate roof. It has two storeys, a symmetrical front of three bays, and a rear wing. The windows are sashes, and all the openings have stone surrounds.	II
Towcett House, cottage and barn 54.56032°N 2.66065°W	—	1848	The house has been extended into the cottage and the first bay of the barn, which may date from an earlier period. The house is stuccoed, the cottage is pebbledashed, and the barn is in stone. All have slate roofs, the house and cottage with stone copings. The house has three bays, the cottage has two, and the barn has five bays. The house has a central Tuscan porch, a door with an architrave, and sash windows. The cottage has a casement window and two horizontally-sliding sashes, and in the barn are a segment-headed wagon entrance and sash windows.	II
Walls, railings and gate, Hillside House; 54.58517°N 2.63393°W	—	Mid 19th century (probable)	The stone walls enclose the garden at the front of the house. The side walls are about 4 feet (1.2 m) high, and the front walls are about 2 feet (0.61 m) high with chamfered coping. On the front walls are cast iron railings with foliate spearheads, and the gates also have wrought iron scrolling.	II
Friends' Burial Ground walls with memorials 54.58695°N 2.64362°W	—	Undated	The drystone walls about 4.5 feet (1.4 m) high enclose the burial ground on four sides. Four memorial slabs have been re-set into the south and west walls, and carry dates in the late 17th and early 18th centuries.	II
