= Sleagill =

Village and civil parish in Cumbria, England

Coordinates: 54.566°N 2.624°W

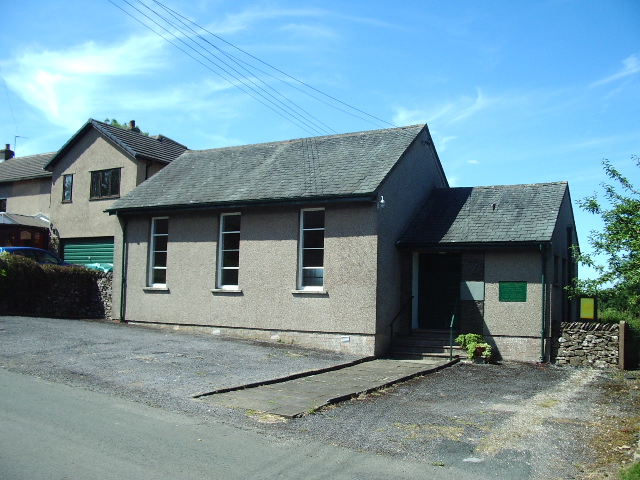
- Sleagill Methodist Church

- Location in Eden, Cumbria Location within Cumbria
- Population: 282 (2011)
- OS grid reference: NY5919
- Civil parish: Sleagill
- Unitary authority: Westmorland and Furness
- Ceremonial county: Cumbria
- Region: North West
- Country: England
- Sovereign state: United Kingdom
- Post town: PENRITH
- Postcode district: CA10
- Dialling code: 01931
- Police: Cumbria
- Fire: Cumbria
- Ambulance: North West
- UK Parliament: Westmorland and Lonsdale

Sleagill is a small village and civil parish in the Westmorland and Furness district of Cumbria, England. At the 2011 census Sleagill was grouped with Newby giving a total population of 282.

== Location ==
The village is about 8 miles (13 km) from the large town of Penrith and about 5 miles (8.0 km) from the small town of Appleby-in-Westmorland.

== Amenities ==
Sleagill has several small businesses in the village but no shops or places of worship.

== Transport ==
For transport there is the A6, the A66 and the M6 motorway a few miles away.

== Nearby settlements ==
Nearby settlements include the large town of Penrith, the small town of Appleby-in-Westmorland, the villages of Morland, King's Meaburn, Cliburn, Newby and Little Strickland and the hamlets of Littlebeck and Reagill.

== See also ==
- Listed buildings in Sleagill
