= Meadrow Unitarian Chapel =

Church in Surrey, England

- Godalming Unitarian Church
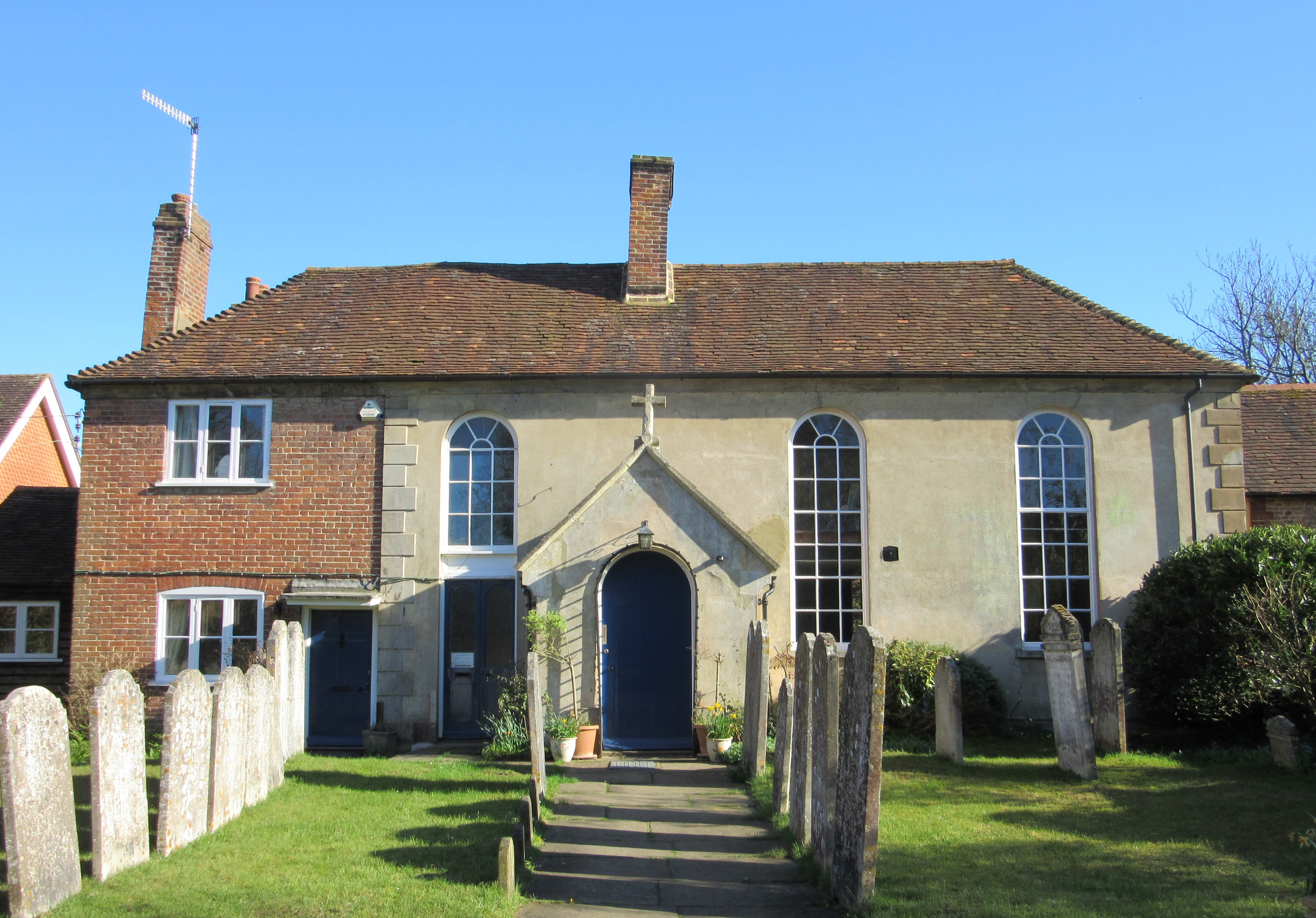
- The chapel from the northwest

Location map and quick summary
Location within Surrey
51.193522°N 0.597792°W
Location	Meadrow, Farncombe, Surrey GU7 3JB
Country	England
Denomination	Unitarianism
Previous denomination	General Baptist
History
Former name	Meadrow General Baptist Chapel
Status	Chapel
Founded	1789
Architecture
Functional status	Open
Heritage designation	Grade II
Designated	16 May 1975
Specifications
Length	35.5 feet (10.8 m)
Width	22 feet (6.7 m)
Materials	Brick, stucco

Meadrow Unitarian Chapel (also known as Meadrow Chapel and Godalming Unitarian Church) is a Unitarian chapel in the Farncombe area of Godalming, Surrey, England. It is part of the London District and South Eastern Provincial Assembly of Unitarian and Free Christian Churches, one of 16 districts within the General Assembly of Unitarian and Free Christian Churches, the umbrella organisation for British Unitarians.

Founded in 1789 as a General Baptist chapel in a town where Protestant Nonconformism was historically strong, it can trace its roots back to informal 17th-century Baptist meetings in houses and other venues. The congregation's doctrines changed during the 19th century to encompass Unitarian ideas, and the church "has long been regarded as Unitarian". Worship took place in another building within the grounds for more than a century until the mid-1970s, when the old chapel—which has been listed at Grade II for its architectural and historical importance—was returned to religious use.

== History ==
=== Context and beliefs ===
The ancient settlement of Godalming is "a rarity among towns of Southern England": it developed as a small-scale industrial centre rather than as a market town. In terms of religion, industrial workers in the 17th, 18th and 19th centuries often tended towards Nonconformism rather than Anglican or Roman Catholic worship, and this was the case in Godalming: during the reign of King Charles II in the late 17th century, well over 1,000 of the 3,000 residents were Nonconformists, although there were no dedicated places of worship at that time (people gathered in conventicles). One of the largest Nonconformist groups, and the longest established and most prominent in the west of Surrey, were Baptists. By the 18th century Calvinistic (Strict and Particular) Baptists had split to form a separate denomination, and most Baptists identified with the General Baptist tradition which differed little in its theology from Anglicanism, the Established Church. However, some of these congregations later experienced a further development in their doctrinal position, towards anti-Trinitarianism (the rejection of the doctrine of the Trinity), and developed into Unitarian churches.

This doctrinal shift happened at Godalming, where General Baptist meetings have a long history. Small groups identifying as Baptist but with no organised structure met in various places in the Godalming area from the 17th century, helped by regular visits from prominent preacher Matthew Caffyn of Horsham in Sussex. By the second half of the 18th century, meetings regularly took place at the house of William Evershed, who lived between Godalming and Eashing. Evershed merely leased this cottage: he owned land and a house in Billingshurst near Horsham, and in 1754 he founded a General Baptist chapel there which soon became Unitarian. (It continues in use as Billingshurst Unitarian Chapel, and descendants of the Evershed family maintained a 260 year connection with it. The last of that line, Susie Evershed, died in August 2022, aged 90, and her memorial stone sits in the chapel grounds surrounded by over 120 Evershed family members who lived and worshipped in the village).

=== Building the chapel ===
In the late 18th century, the congregation who met at Evershed's house decided to build a permanent chapel in Godalming. Records show that on "Wed June 4th 1783, at a church meeting held at Bro. Wm. Evershed's at Eashing, Godalming, it was agreed that a more convenient Place of Public Worship may conduce much to the ease and prosperity of this chapel. Agreed that a meeting house be Erected at Meadrow, Godalming for that purpose." A site was found at Meadrow, north of the River Wey, and the chapel was built and opened in 1789. The "simple, attractive building" had a baptistery to allow total-immersion baptism in accordance with General Baptist principles: the first such baptism was recorded in 1809. The church gradually moved towards Unitarianism and became fully associated with that denomination in the second half of the 19th century. Another small group which met at a house in Crownpits elsewhere in Godalming later joined the congregation. The group called itself the "Particular Unitarian Baptist Church" and traced its roots back many years.

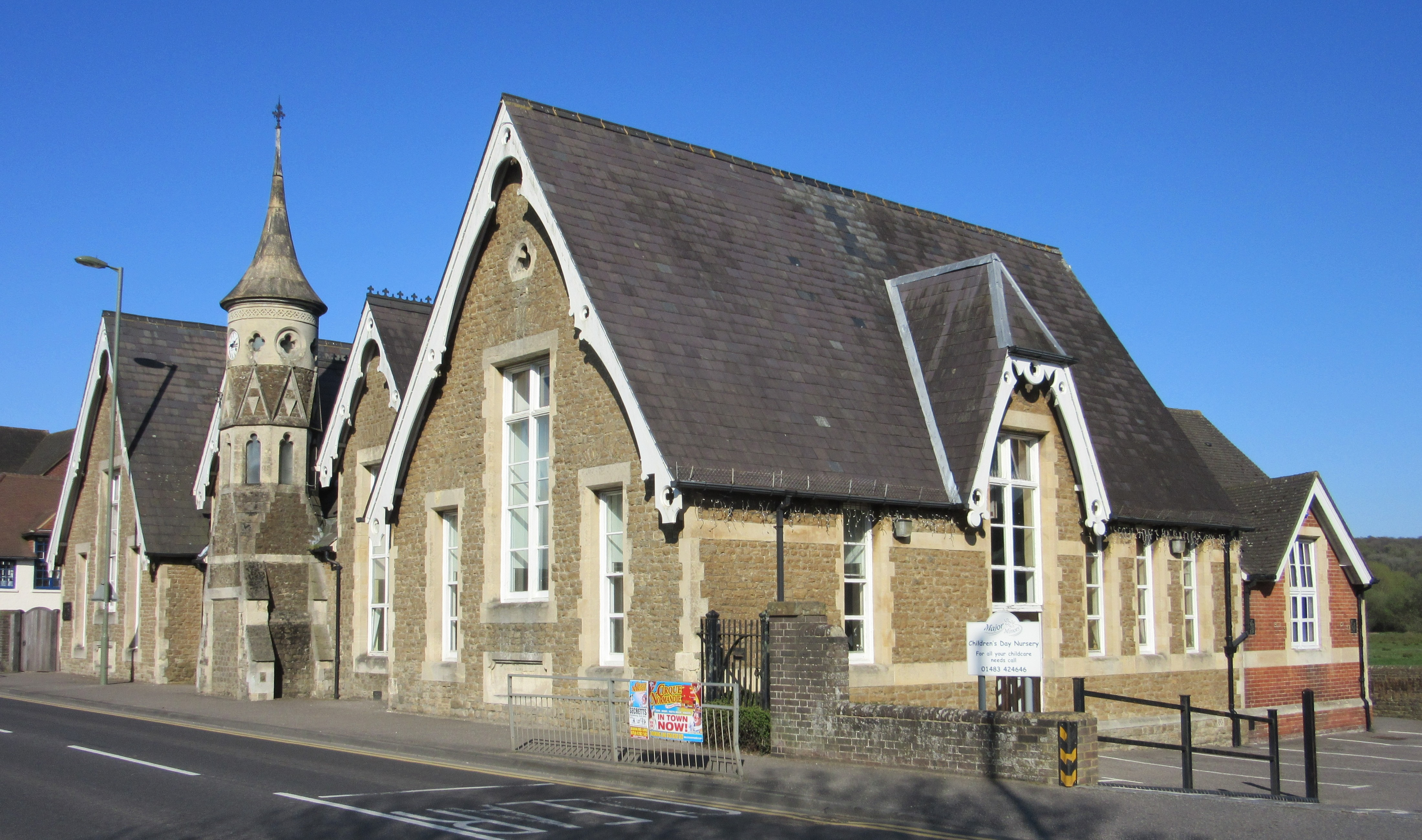
The British School on Bridge Street was founded by Meadrow Chapel.

In 1821 a brick cottage was built on to the north side of the chapel. In 1870 a Gothic Revival-style Sunday school building was constructed much closer to the road; it was later converted into a chapel, and the 1789 building became the Sunday school. This situation was reversed in 1975 or 1976 when the 1870 building reverted to its original role as a schoolroom and meeting room and worship again took place in the old chapel.

As well as the Sunday school, the church—like many others during the Victorian era, when "a keen sense of social justice" characterised Nonconformist churches in particular—helped to found a free non-denominational day school in accordance with Joseph Lancaster's educational model. A site was found on Bridge Road near the town centre and "a fine new British school" was built. Now Grade II-listed, it was constructed in 1872 and extended in about 1900.

After the church moved back from the 1870 building into the original chapel, it was registered for the solemnisation of marriages in June 1976. It is also licensed for worship in accordance with the Places of Worship Registration Act 1855 and has the registration number 74351.

== Architecture ==
The chapel was designated a Grade II listed building on 16 May 1975. Such buildings are defined as "nationally important and of special interest". As of February 2001, it was one of 1,548 Grade II listed buildings and 1,661 listed buildings of all grades in the Borough of Waverley, the local government district in which Godalming is situated. It is one of several current and former places of worship in Godalming with listed status: St Edmund's Roman Catholic Church, the Quaker meeting house on Mill Street, the former Salvation Army Hall on Mint Street (originally Congregational, and later Methodist) and the later Congregational church on Bridge Street (also no longer in religious use) are all Grade II-listed, and St Peter and St Paul's parish church has Grade I status.

The chapel is a single-storey building of red-brown brick laid in the English bond pattern. The brickwork is still visible on the attached cottage, but the chapel has been rendered with stucco. The cottage has two storeys but is the same height as the chapel; they share a roof, which is laid with tiles. The façade consists of four bays of which the leftmost is formed by the cottage. A gabled porch is placed centrally, and there is a chimneystack halfway along the roof and another on the end of the cottage. The divide between the cottage and the chapel is marked by quoins, and a cornice runs across the façade below the roofline. The chapel has three arched windows: the two to the right of the entrance porch are full-height, but the other (between the cottage and the porch) lights only the upper section of the chapel. There is a door below it which may have replaced the lower section. Another door gives entry to the cottage; it is set below a straight-headed porch with a wooden architrave. The chapel's porch has a round-arched entrance and a cross on the gable. There are three round-arched windows to the rear of the chapel, which is faced with slates and which backs on to the River Wey.

Inside, the original pews and benches have been moved to the walls to give an open worship space which takes up the rightmost two bays of the chapel. Separated from this above the third bay is a panelled gallery supported by columns and a cross beam. A "good row of hat-pegs" was noted in a survey of 1986. The chapel, inclusive of all three bays, measures 35.5 by 22 feet (10.8 m × 6.7 m). The baptistery, set into the floor, survives: there are brick steps down into it, and it is lined with bricks.

== Burial ground ==
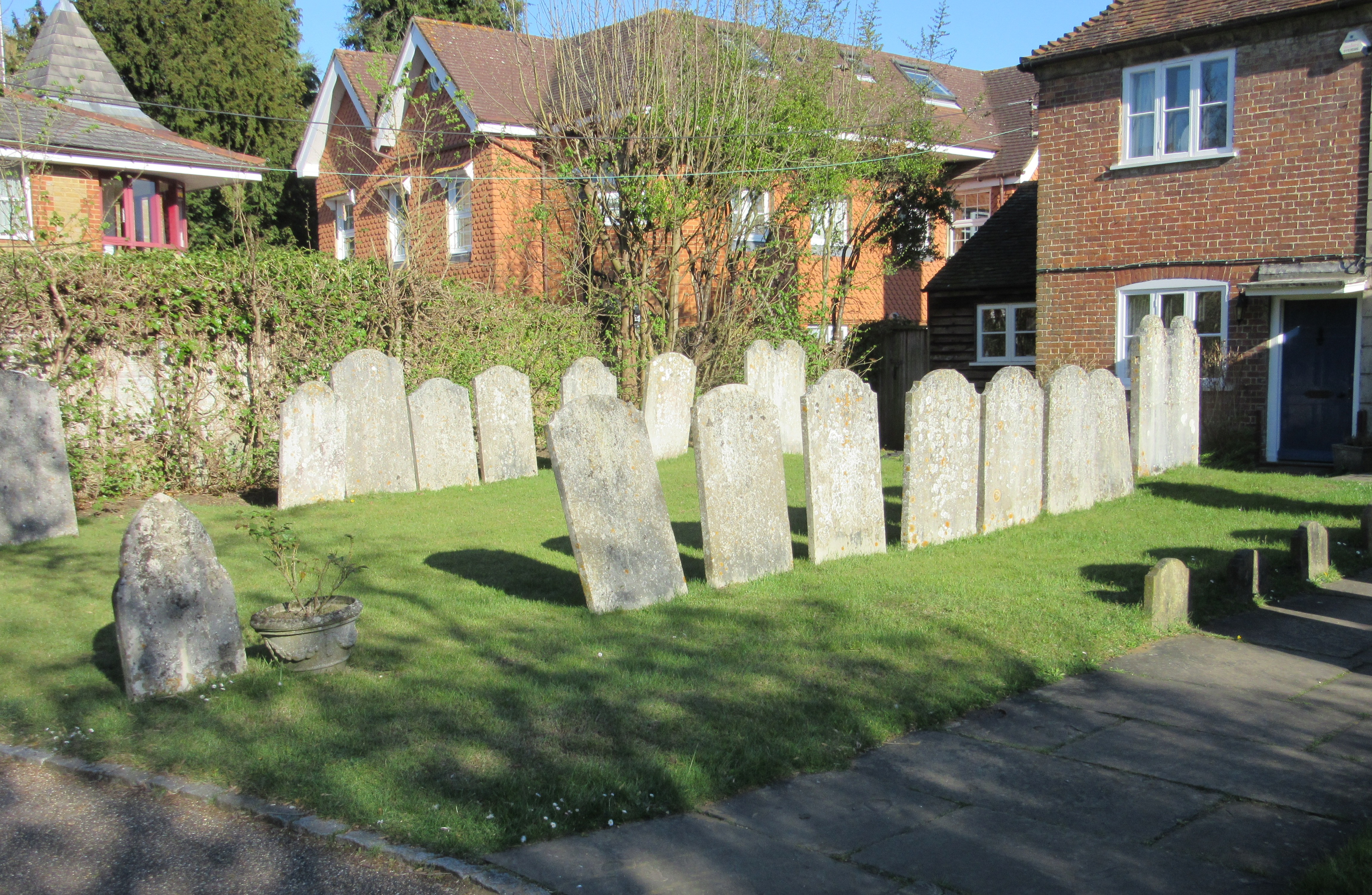
The north side of the burial ground

The last burial at the chapel took place in 1869. Ten years later the first transcript was taken of the inscriptions on the monuments and gravestones.

There are four burial vaults in front of the chapel. From north to south they are:

- Henry Portsmouth Elphs (died 1833) and Betty Elphs (died 1834)
- Thomas Pilsley (died 1810: the first burial in the burial ground) and Ann Pilsley (died 1816)
- John Ellis (died 1824), Mary Ellis (died 1825) and Sarah Ellis (died 1815): John Ellis was a major contributor to the chapel's construction
- George Knight (died 1843) and Emily Knight (died 1848)

Including these vaults, 46 people are interred in the burial ground. There are three rows of eight, two and nine graves on the north side of the path to the chapel entrance; four under the path (commemorated by stones set into it); and two rows of five and four to the south of the path. There are four burials behind the 1870 building (by the northern boundary of the burial ground) and six alongside the southern boundary. The surname Ellis appears 12 times, and in the first row of eight graves seven are named Cooke.

== See also ==
- List of places of worship in Waverley (borough)
