= Littlebeck =

Littlebeck may refer to the following places in England:

- Littlebeck, Cumbria
- Littlebeck, North Yorkshire
