= Thomas Lawson (botanist) =

English botanist and Quaker

Thomas Lawson (1630–1691) was an English botanist and Quaker.

== Life ==
Lawson was born 10 October 1630 at Lawkland, in the parish of Clapham, Yorkshire, the son of Thomas and Elizabeth Lawson. Educated at Giggleswick School, the local grammar school, he was admitted sizar of Christ's College, Cambridge 25 July 1650. Lawson apparently dropped out of university, although his brother completed a course. Lawson became an adept in Hebrew, Greek, and Latin.

At some point in the early 1650s he became a clergyman at Rampside, a village on the Furness Peninsula. The village had a chapel of ease and was part of the parish of Dalton. During this period, although the Church of England was retained, episcopacy was suppressed and there was tolerance of independent churches. George Fox visited him at Rampside in 1652, and was invited to preach. Lawson soon after became convinced of the unlawfulness of preaching for hire, and at twenty-three gave up his living to join the Quakers. He was frequently distrained upon for non-payment of tithe, and was imprisoned. He was one of the early activists known as the Valiant Sixty.

Lawson married, 24 March 1658, Frances Wilkinson, and settled at Great Strickland in Westmorland, where he took pupils from the sons of the gentry round.

== Herbalist and botanist ==
In the 1670s Lawson had to close temporarily his school in Westmorland because of problems with the authorities. In 1674 he taught botany to the daughters of Margaret Fell at Swarthmore. (Margaret Fell, who was by this time married to George Fox, had seven daughters from her first marriage). According to the Oxford Dictionary of National Biography, this is our "earliest firm evidence" of Lawson's interest in botany.

Gerard Croese called Lawson the most noted herbalist in England. John Ray, to whom he was close, speaks of him as a "diligent, industrious, and skilful botanist", from whom he received much assistance. Lawson was asked to contribute to Synopsis Methodica Insectorum, which Ray planned but did not live to complete, and Thomas Robinson in his Essay towards a Natural History of Westmoreland and Cumberland used manuscripts supplied by Lawson's daughter. Several English plants were first noted by him, and a species of hieracium (Hieracium Lawsonii) was named after him.

== Death, family, legacy ==
Lawson died at Great Strickland 12 November 1691, leaving land in Westmorland and Pennsylvania. A former pupil of Lawson erected a monument above the grave at Newby, which is a listed structure. In it were also deposited the remains of his wife, and their only son, Jonah. Of his three daughters the eldest, Ruth, whose letters in Latin are still extant, married without her father's knowledge Christopher Yeats, one of his pupils, who took holy orders; Lawson was rebuked by the Friends for his readiness in accepting the situation.

His manuscript notes made on walking tours throughout England, giving localities of plants, and arranged under counties, came into the possession of a descendant, Lawson Thompson of Hitchin. To Yeats and his wife Lawson left most of his property, including all his manuscripts. Several of those were preserved at Devonshire House, and Thomas Ellwood, in a letter (1 July 1698) which is among them, recommends publication.

== Works ==
He published the following:

- (With B. Nicholson and J. Harwood) ‘A Brief Discovery of a Threefold Estate, &c.,’ 1653.
- (With John Slee) ‘An untaught Teacher Witnessed against,’ &c., 1655. Against Matthew Caffyn.
- ‘The Lip of Truth opened against a Dawber with untempered Morter,’ &c. Lond. 1656.
- ‘An Appeal to the Parliament concerning the Poor, that there may not be a Beggar in England,’ 1660.
- ‘Eine Antwort auf ein Buch,’ 1668.
- ‘Baptismalogia or a Treatise concerning Baptisms; whereunto is added a Discourse concerning the Supper, Bread and Wine called also Communion,’ Lond. 1677–8.
- ‘Dagon's Fall before the Ark, or the Smoak of the Bottomless Pit scoured away by the breath of the Lord's Mouth, and by the Brightness of his Coming,’ Lond. 1679.
- ‘A Mite into the Treasury, being a word to Artists, especially to Heptatechnists, the Professors of the Seven Liberal Arts, so-called Grammer, Logick, Rhetorick, Musick, Arithmetick, Geometry, Astronomy,’ Lond. 1680.
- ‘A Treatise relating to the Call, Work, and Wages of the Ministers of Christ, as also to the Call, Work, and Wages of the Ministers of Antichrist,’ 1680. These last four were reprinted in two volumes, under the title of ‘Two Treatises of Thomas Lawson deceased,’ &c., and ‘Two Treatises more,’ &c., in 1703.
- ‘A Serious Remembrancer to Live Well, written primarily to Children and Young People; secondarily to Parents, useful (I hope) for all,’ 1684.
