= St Laurence's Church, Morland =

Coordinates: 54.5965°N 2.6235°W

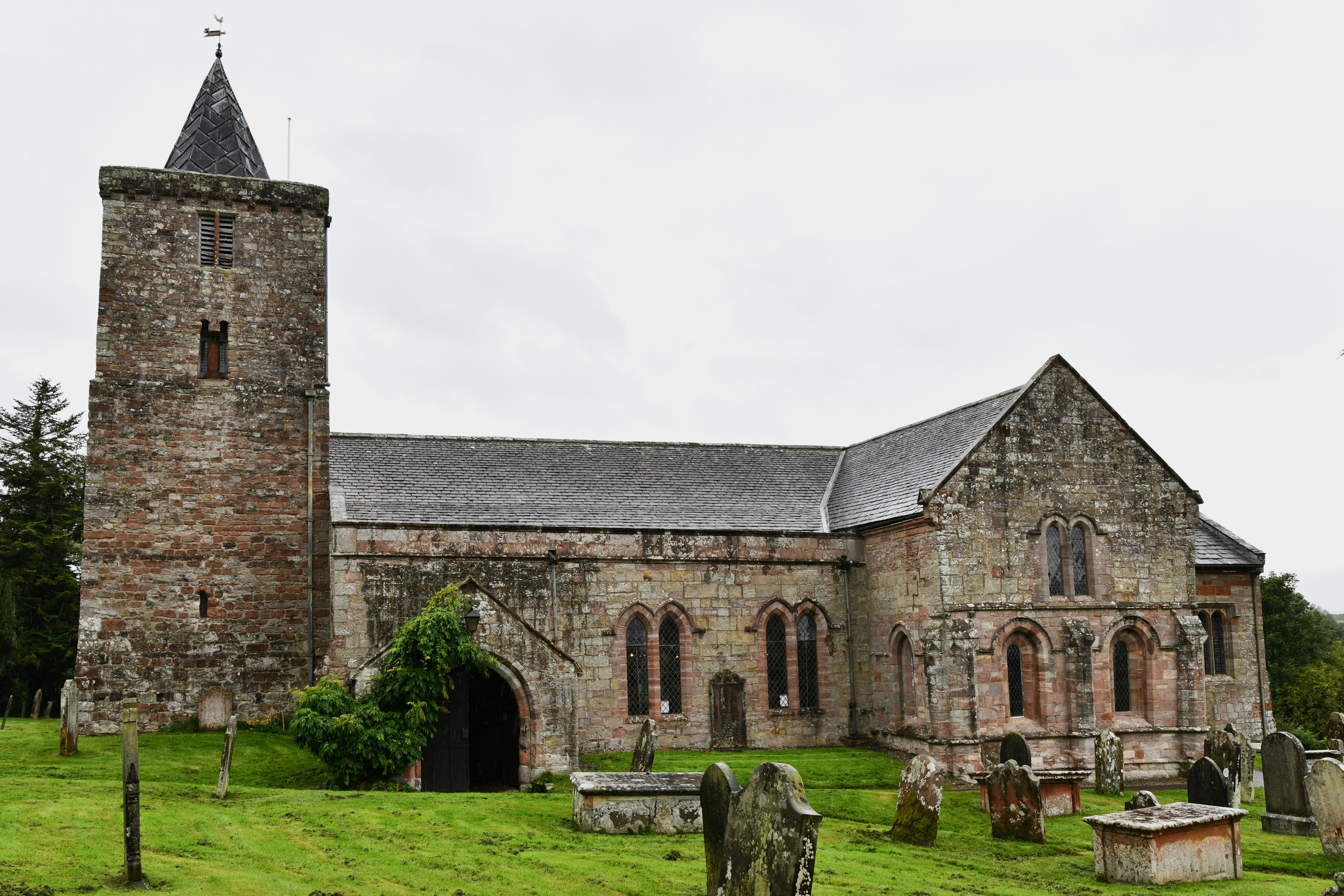
- St Laurence's Church, Morland, from the south

- Location in Cumbria
- OS grid reference: NY 598 226
- Location: Morland, Cumbria
- Country: England
- Denomination: Anglican
- Website: St Lawrence, Morland

History
- Status: Parish church

Architecture
- Functional status: Active
- Heritage designation: Grade I
- Designated: 6 February 1968
- Architect(s): C. J. Ferguson, W. D. Caröe (restorations)
- Architectural type: Church
- Style: Anglo-Saxon, Norman, Gothic

Specifications
- Materials: Stone, slate roofs

Administration
- Province: York
- Diocese: Carlisle
- Archdeaconry: Carlisle
- Deanery: Appleby
- Parish: Morland

Clergy
- Priest: Revd Stephen Tudway

St Lawrence's Church is in the village of Morland, Cumbria, England. It is an active Anglican parish church in the deanery of Appleby, the archdeaconry of Carlisle, and the diocese of Carlisle. The parish of Morland includes the historic parish of Thrimby, with its church of St Mary, Little Strickland. The benefice of Morland is united, under the name North Westmorland, with the parishes of Askham and Lowther, Bampton, Bolton, Cliburn, Clifton and Brougham, Crosby Ravensworth, Shap and Great Strickland. The church is recorded in the National Heritage List for England as a designated Grade I listed building. It has the only Anglo-Saxon tower in Cumbria.

== History ==
The precise date of the tower is uncertain, but it has been dated to between 1041 and 1055. It was raised in height in 1588, and the small spire was added later. The nave dates from the 12th century, and includes some Norman features. The aisles were added later in that century, followed by the chancel and transepts during the next century. The chancel was rebuilt in 1600, and the north aisle in the 18th century. The church was restored in 1896 by C. J. Ferguson, and work was carried out in the 20th century by W. D. Caröe.

== Architecture ==
=== Exterior ===
The church is constructed in rubble stone, with slate roofs, and a short lead-covered spire on top of the tower. It has a cruciform plan, consisting of a three-bay nave, north and south aisles, a south porch, north and south transepts, a chancel, a north vestry, and a west tower. The tower dates from before the Norman conquest, and is in three stages. It has no buttresses or external doors, and its windows are very small. The bell openings are deeply set with baluster mullions. On the west side of the tower is a blue clock face. In the transepts are 13th-century lancet windows. The windows on the south side of the chancel, and the east window, have four lights and are Perpendicular in style. The windows along the side of the north aisle are Georgian with keystones. The south porch is gabled, with stone benches inside. The inner doorway dates from the 13th century, and has a pointed arch.

=== Interior ===
Four steps lead down into the interior of the church. The tower is entered by a very narrow door. The south arcade is carried on round piers with octagonal abaci, and has pointed arches. The north arcade is similar, except that one of the piers is octagonal, and has a capital decorated with scallops. There are fragments of Norman zigzag carving incorporated in the wall above the north transept, and in the west wall of the north aisle. The reredos dates from 1926, and is by Caröe. The altar rail dates from the late 17th century, and is carried on balusters. The pulpit has been reduced from a three-decker and is dated 1721. The font consists of a small octagonal bowl; its cover is inscribed with the date 1662. Also in the church is a poor box, cut from a log, and dated 1648. Only the east window contains stained glass; this dates from 1926 and is by Powells. In the south transept is a coffin lid from the 13th century, carved with a foliated cross. The two-manual pipe organ was made in 1913 by Binns, and restored in 1951. In the tower are three bells, dated 1687, 1726, and 1764.

== External features ==
Associated with the church are three structures that have been listed. To the southeast of the chancel is an altar tomb dating from the 15th century, probably formerly inside the church. It is constructed in sandstone blocks, and has three brass plates, the oldest inscribed with the date 1781. The tomb is listed at Grade II*. To the southwest of the tower is a sundial consisting of a medieval cross-base, with a column dating probably from the 19th century. It is listed at Grade II. Also listed at Grade II are the gatepiers and attached walls at the entrance to the churchyard. The gatepiers are rusticated, and surmounted by ball finials, There is a weathered inscription on the east side; only the date 1723 is legible.

== Notable burials ==
- Michael of Glasgow (fl. 1114), nominal bishop of Glasgow.

== Gallery ==
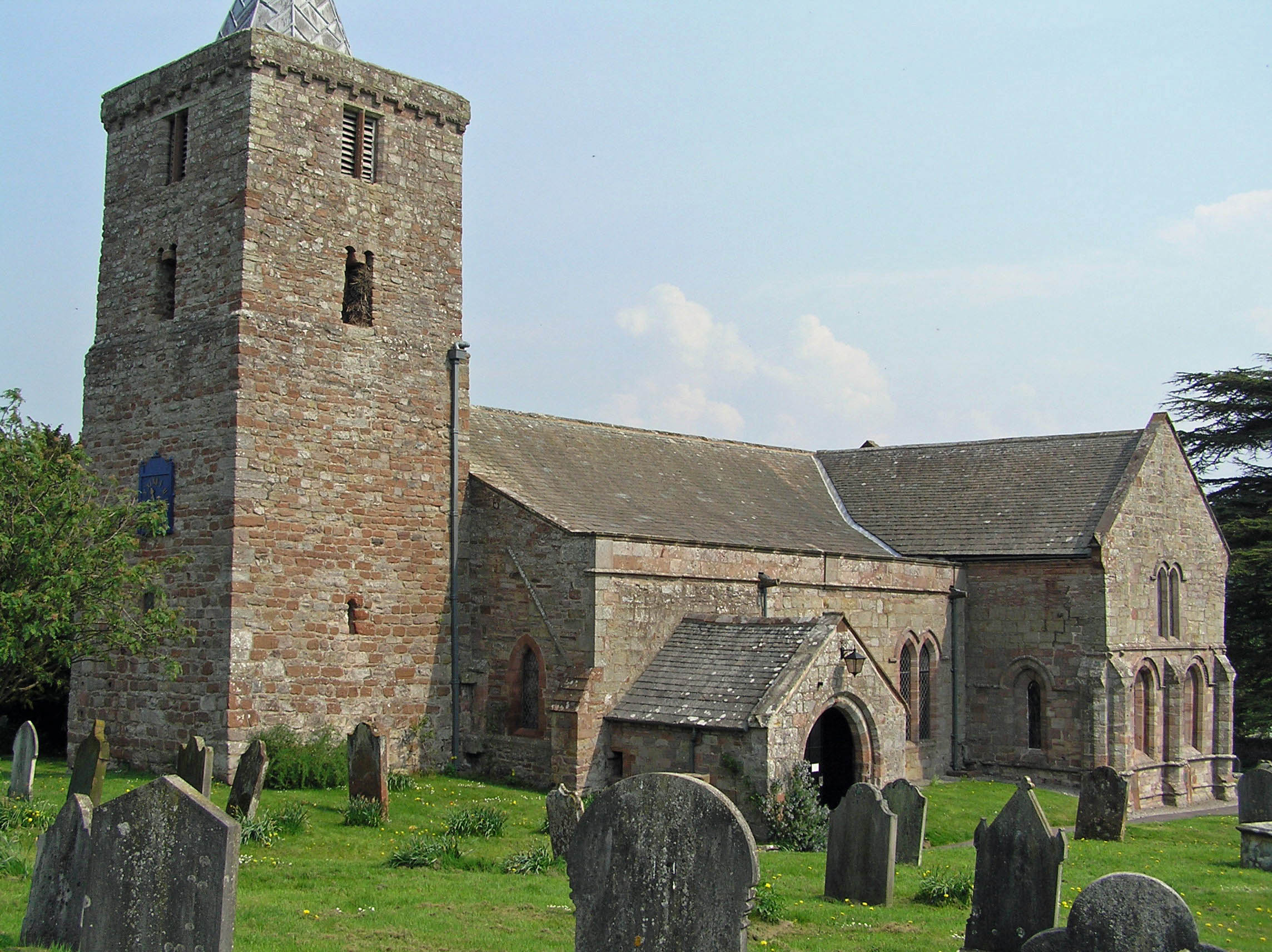
Morland church - general view

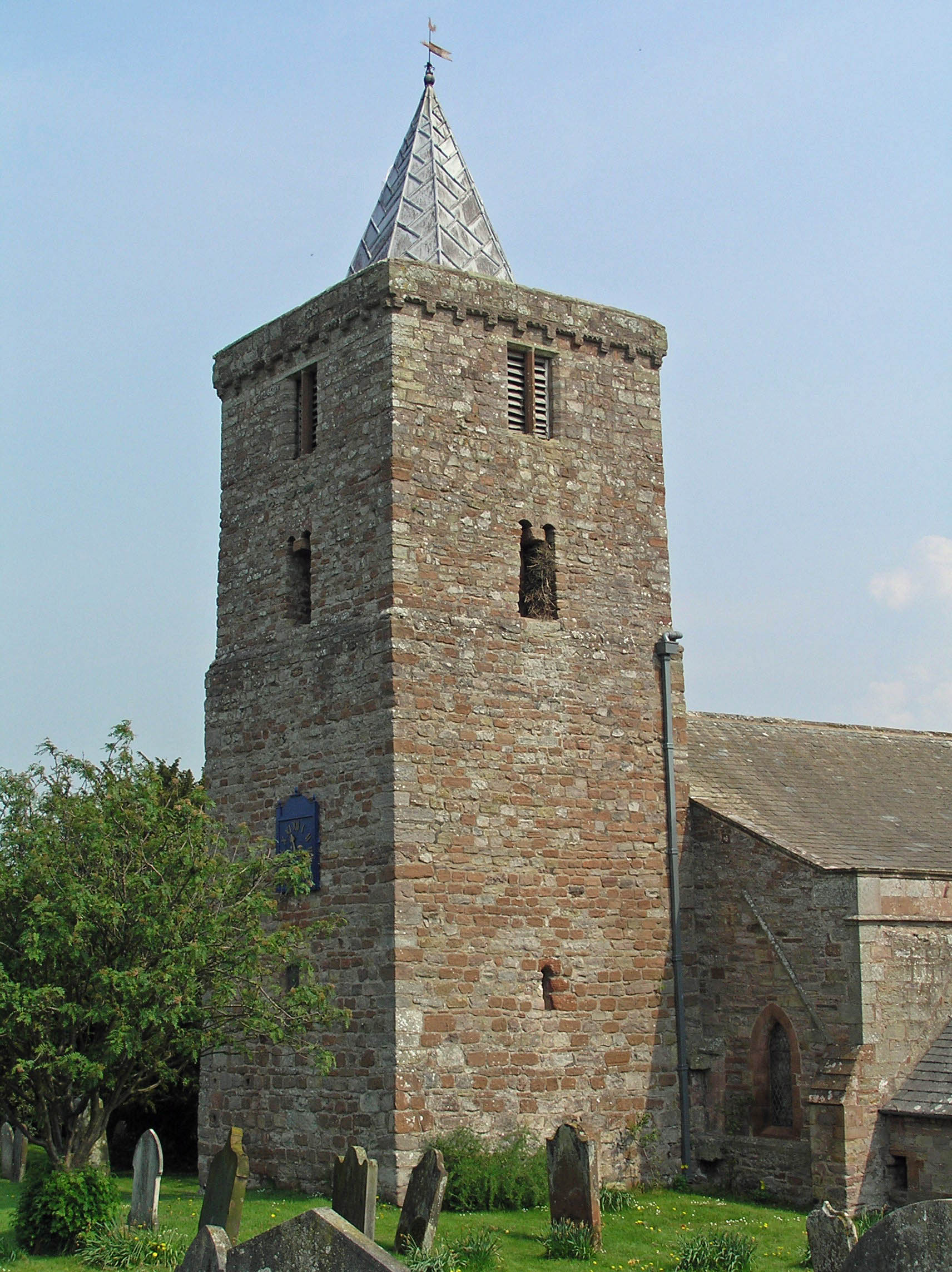
Morland church; the Anglo-Saxon tower

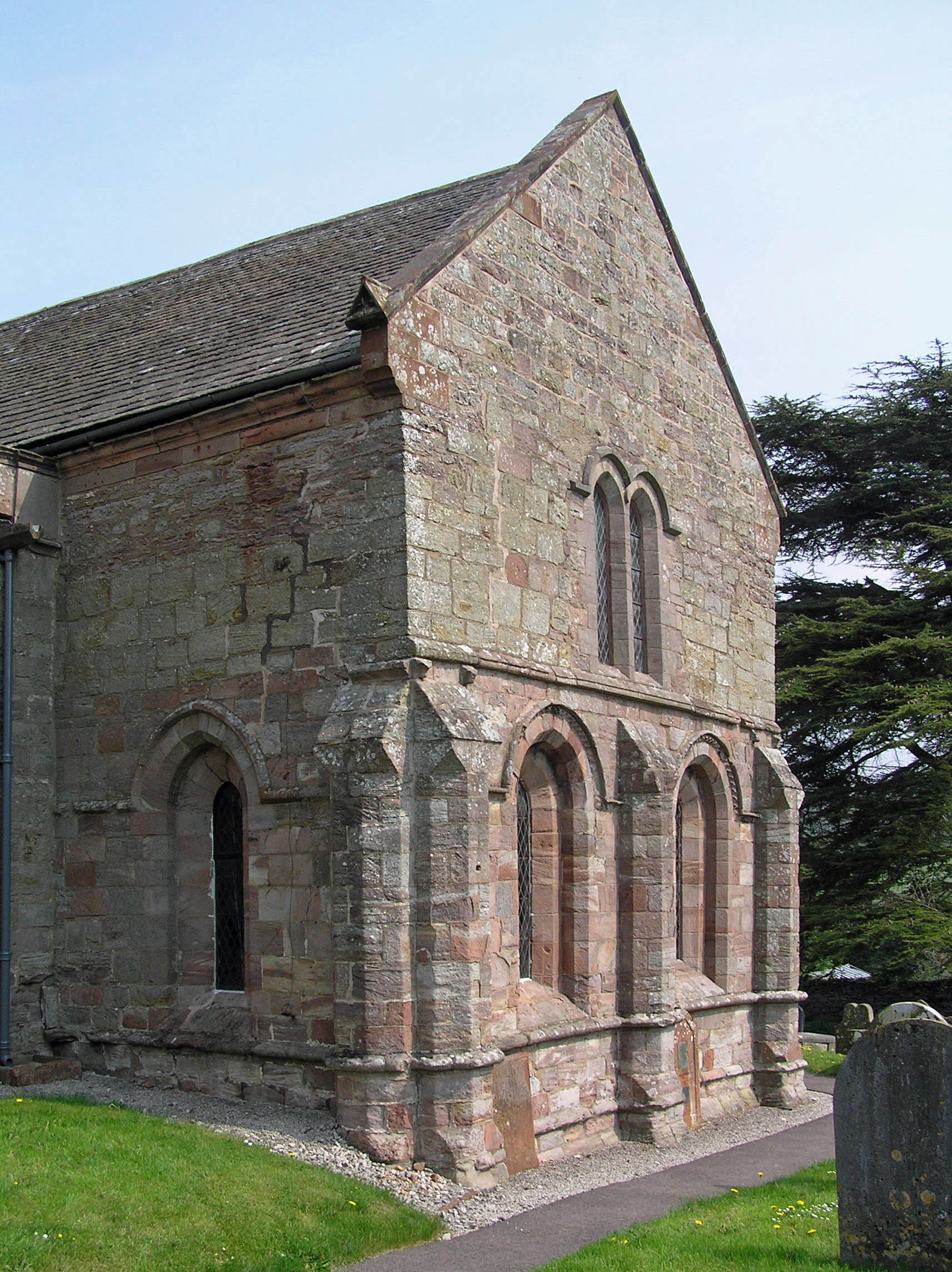
Morland church, south transept

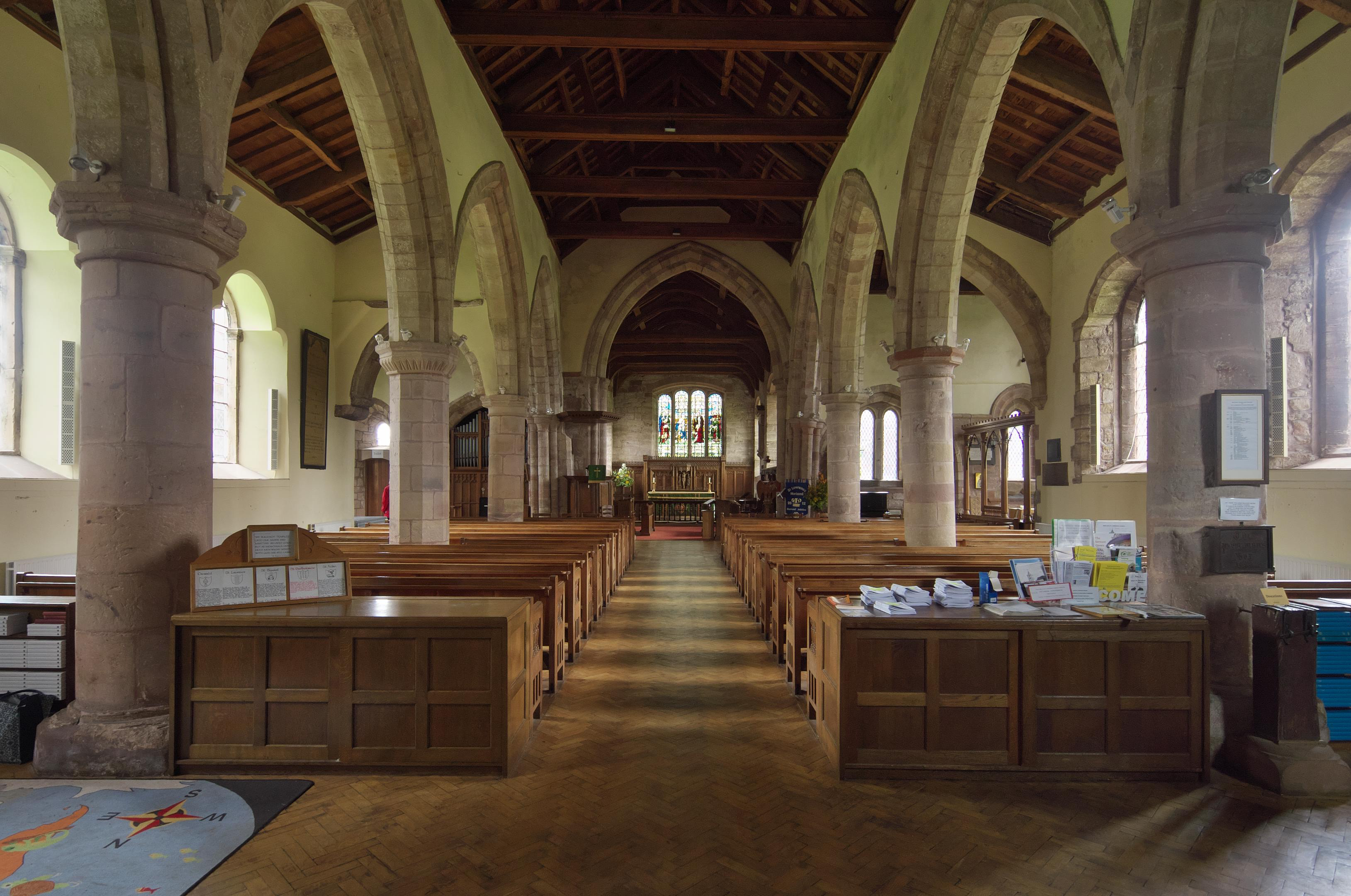
Interior of St Laurence's Church Morland, eastern view

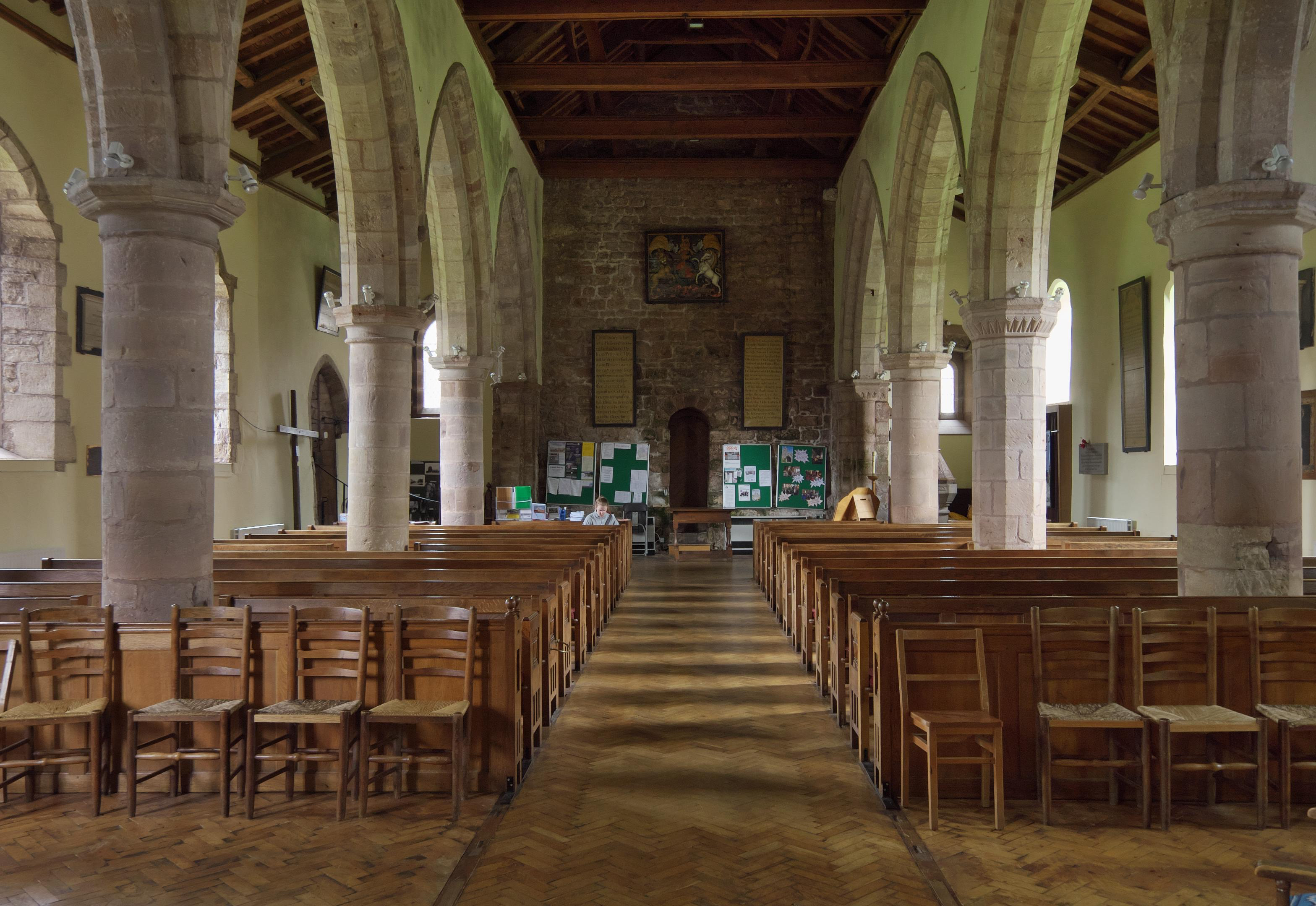
Interior of St Laurence's Church Morland, western view

== See also ==
- Grade I listed churches in Cumbria
- Grade I listed buildings in Cumbria
- Listed buildings in Morland, Cumbria
