= Horsham Unitarian Church =

Church in West Sussex, England

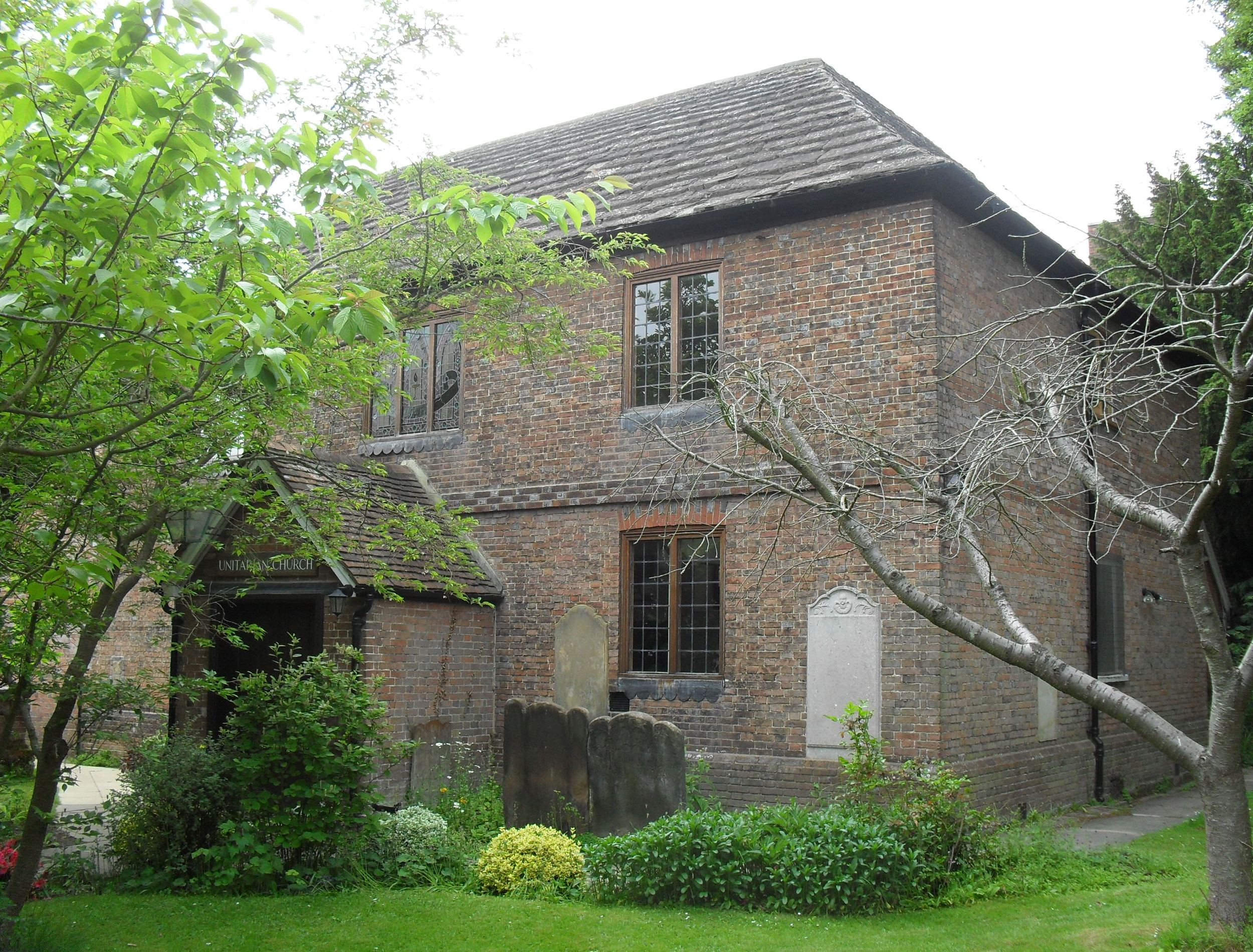
- The chapel from the east

- Location of the chapel within West Sussex
- 51.0629°N 0.3334°W
- OS grid reference: TQ 16886 30605
- Location: Worthing Road, Horsham, West Sussex RH12 1SL
- Country: England
- Denomination: Unitarian
- Previous denomination: General Baptist
- Website: www.ukunitarians.org.uk/horsham/

History
- Former name: Horsham General Baptist Chapel
- Status: Chapel
- Founded: 1719
- Founder(s): Matthew Caffyn (congregation); John Dendy and John Greeve (present building)

Architecture
- Functional status: Active
- Heritage designation: Grade II
- Designated: 20 May 1949
- Style: Vernacular
- Groundbreaking: 1720
- Completed: 1721

Horsham Unitarian Church (formerly Horsham General Baptist Chapel) is a Unitarian chapel in Horsham in the English county of West Sussex. It was founded in 1719 to serve the large Baptist population of the ancient market town of Horsham—home of radical preacher Matthew Caffyn—and the surrounding area. The chapel's congregation moved towards Unitarian beliefs in the 19th century, but the simple brick building continued to serve worshippers drawn from a wide area of Sussex. It is one of several places of worship which continue to represent Horsham's centuries-old tradition of Protestant Nonconformism, and is the town's second oldest surviving religious building—only St Mary's, the parish church, predates it. English Heritage has listed the chapel at Grade II for its architectural and historical importance.

== History ==
In England, people and ministers who worshipped outside the Church of England but were not part of the Roman Catholic Church were historically known as Protestant Dissenters or Nonconformists. Nonconformism became officially recognised after the Act of Uniformity 1662, which removed from their living those Church of England ministers who refused to recognise or abide by the Act's requirements. Alternative denominations developed, many focused mainly on a personal relationship with God rather than on the rites and ceremonies of religious worship as in the Anglican and Roman Catholic churches. This trend was seen throughout Sussex, and by the late 17th century "the all-embracing medieval Church" existed alongside newly established denominations.

One of these denominations was the Arminian or General Baptists, coming from Puritanism. Along with the Religious Society of Friends (Quakers) and the Presbyterians, they found significant early success in the area around the north Sussex market town of Horsham. By 1676 there were about 100 Nonconformists in the town, and the General Baptists were led by local evangelist Matthew Caffyn. Under his leadership, Baptists had met in small house-groups in the area (in particular at Southwater and Broadbridge Heath) since 1669 or possibly as early as 1645. His influence on Baptist causes throughout southeast England was considerable: in 1696, his increasingly unorthodox beliefs caused a separation in the General Assembly, and its response to his changing theology was significant in the development of Unitarianism.

The Act of Toleration 1689 gave greater freedom to Nonconformist denominations: they no longer had to meet in secret in houses, and could build their own chapels. In 1719, a trust was formed to acquire land on the west side of the road to Worthing, and a chapel was built between 1720 and 1721. The trust document required the land to be used for "Anabaptists ... maintaining the faith of General Redemption and the faith and practice of Believers' Baptism, and for such only". By this time, Caffyn had died and his son, also named Matthew, had succeeded him as a preacher in Horsham. The founders, John Dendy and John Greeve, paid £36.15s.- (£6,570 as of 2025) for the land, and were responsible for building the cottage-like chapel and laying out the garden around it.

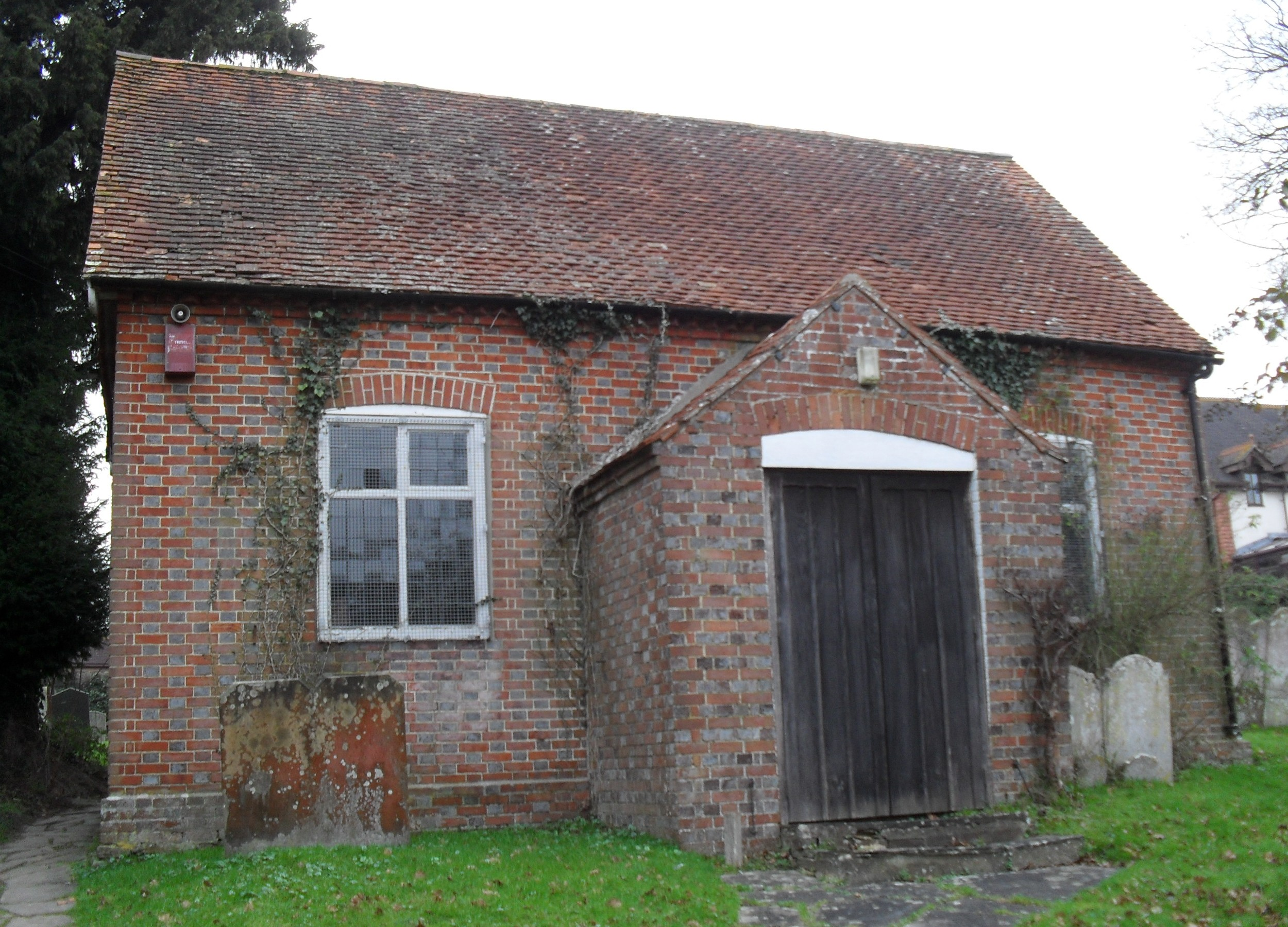
Many of the chapel's early worshippers lived in Billingshurst. A chapel was founded there in 1754, and survives.

There were known to be 18 Baptist families in Horsham in 1724, but in the chapel's early years about 350 worshippers typically attended: the building served as a central worship place for congregations and individual people across a large area. In particular, many travelled in from the village of Billingshurst. The church became large enough to plant a new one in Billingshurst in 1754. It was still linked to the Horsham cause until about 1818, when it officially became self governing following a disagreement. Now as an Unitarian, it remains in use as a place of worship. Soon after the chapel opened, Baptists formed the largest denomination of Nonconformists in Horsham—overtaking the Quakers, who were in decline, and Presbyterians. Other Nonconformists in Horsham in the 18th and 19th centuries included Strict Baptists, Independent Baptists, Plymouth Brethren, Congregationalists, Methodists and Latter-day Saints.

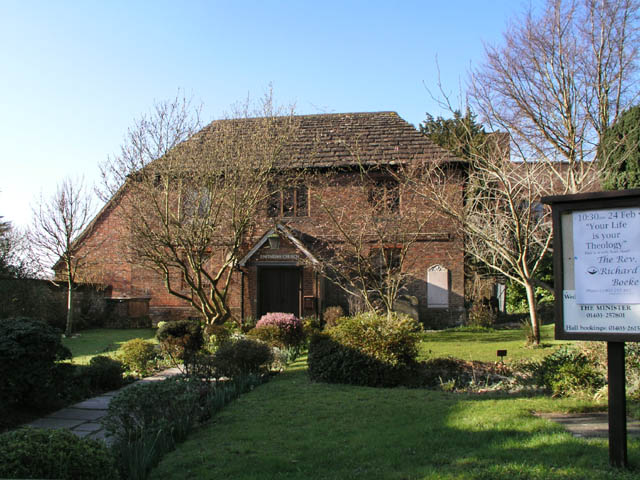
An extension was built under a sloping lean-to roof (pictured to the left) in 1772.

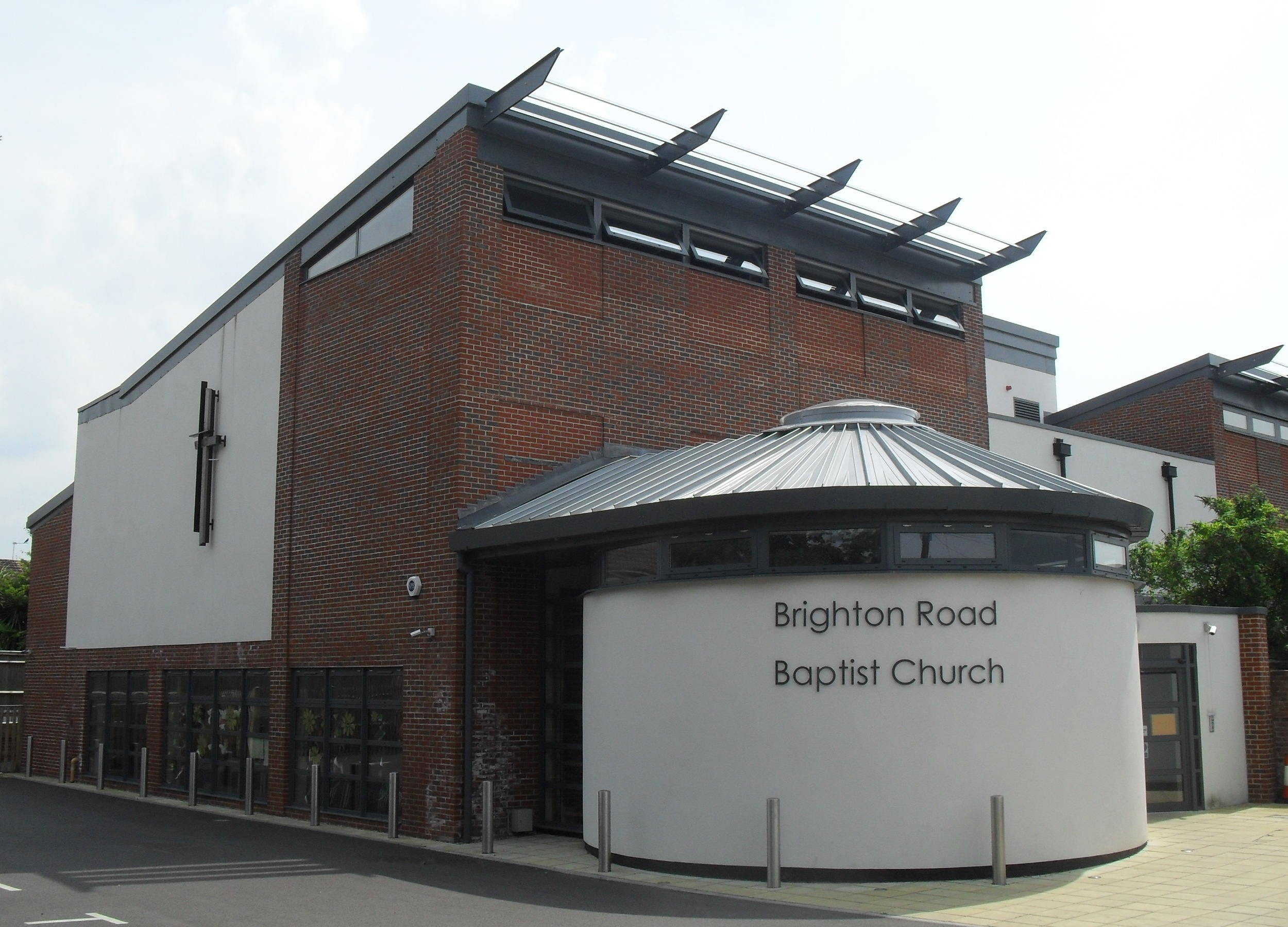
The chapel moved towards Unitarianism in the 19th century, but a new General Baptist cause was founded on the Brighton Road in the 1890s (present Brighton Road Baptist Church pictured).

Horsham General Baptist Chapel was extended in 1727 with the addition of an entrance porch. The original rostrum was replaced with a conventional pulpit in 1752, and in 1772 the building was extended at the south end to accommodate a second vestry and an internal baptistery. Until this, worshippers were taken to the mill pond at nearby Broadbridge Heath to be baptised. The garden was by now used for burials, and it was extended in 1816. Later in the 19th century, more changes were made inside, the porch was rebuilt, pews were installed and one of the original galleries was removed. The most active period of reordering was between 1867 and 1872. The 19th century was also characterised by pastoral and community work: a school was established in the chapel, although it later moved to a private house; in 1839, the incumbent minister started an educational academy in a building in Albion Terrace, which published its own journal (the Albion Terrace Academy Gazette) for several years; and the same minister founded Horsham's first library in the chapel. The Horsham General Baptist Book and Tract Society offered about 4,000 books to the public. In 1893, Rev. John J. Marten founded what became the Horsham Museum: originally based in the chapel, it is now housed in a building on The Causeway.

The move away from Baptist beliefs and towards Unitarianism began at the start of the 19th century and was well established by 1820. Starting in 1878, the chapel's name changed from Horsham General Baptist Chapel to Horsham Unitarian (Baptist) Chapel, Horsham Free Christian Church, Horsham Free Christian (Unitarian) Church and latterly Horsham Unitarian Church. Some General Baptists remained in the town, though, and in 1896 a chapel was founded on the Brighton Road to accommodate them. Since 1894, worshippers had met in a pub. The original iron and brick church survived until 1917, and its stone and brick successor of 1923 was in turn demolished and rebuilt in 2007. Brighton Road Baptist Church also established two daughter churches in the Horsham area.

An eccentric local spinster, Elizabeth Gatford, endowed a charity at the chapel in the late 18th century. In her will, she left five guineas per year to be spent on bread which was to be given out to poor people every Sunday in the chapel. She left most of her fortune to be spent on her large collection of birds and animals, though, and she demanded that her burial should take place a month after her death; furthermore, she was buried in four coffins placed one inside the other. The endowment was still in existence in 1964, when it yielded £5.5s.- (£90 as of 2025). A 20th-century stone tablet inside the chapel commemorates this bequest.

Horsham Unitarian Church was listed at Grade II by English Heritage on 20 May 1949; this defines it as a "nationally important" building of "special interest". As of February 2001, there were 1,628 Grade II listed buildings, and 1,726 listed buildings of all grades, in the district of Horsham.

The chapel is a member of the General Assembly of Unitarian and Free Christian Churches, the umbrella organisation for British Unitarians.

== Architecture and description ==
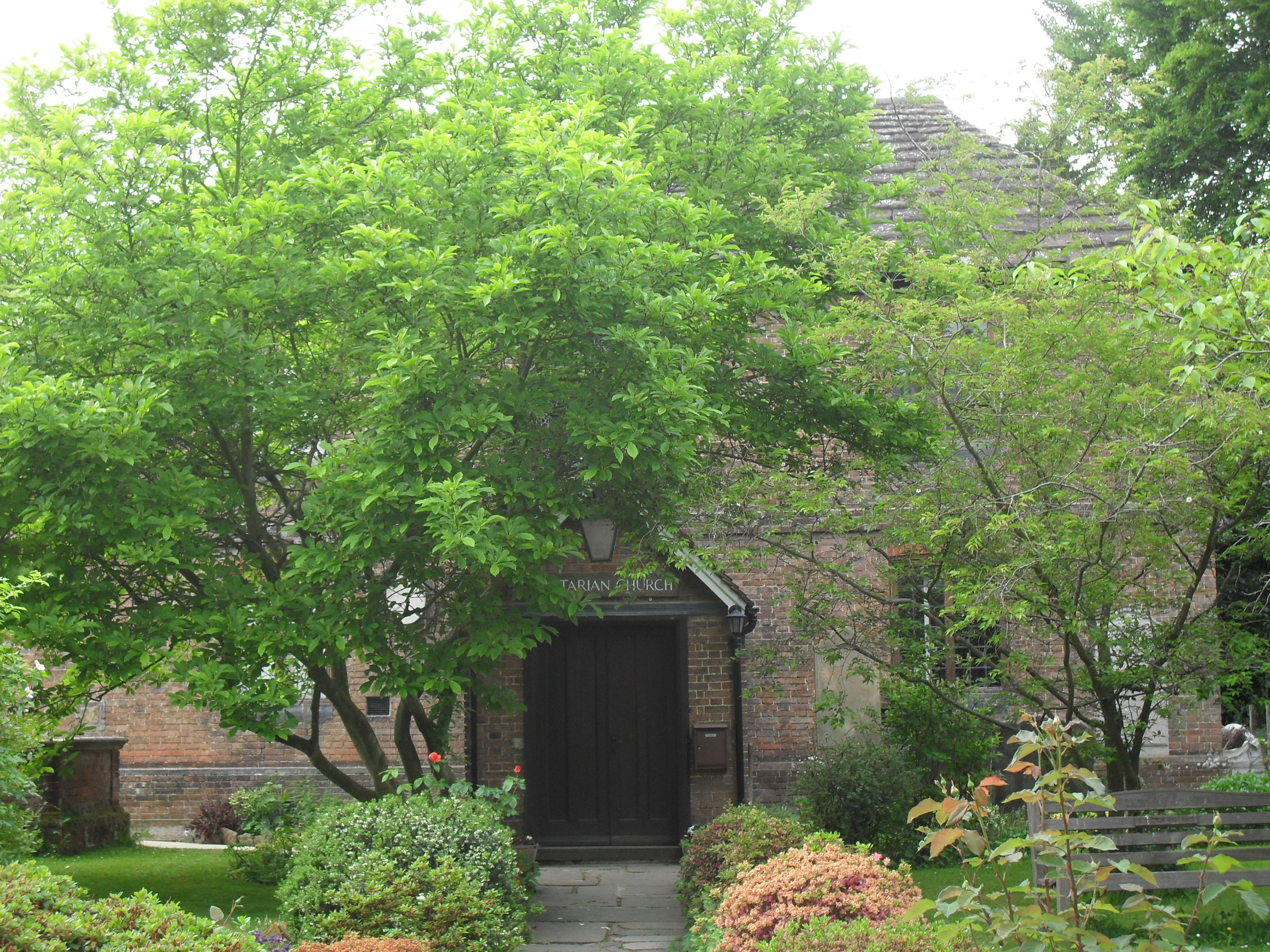
The chapel is set back from the road in extensive grounds.

Early Unitarian chapels are characteristically simple, homely, domestic-style buildings—partly because they were not expected to become permanent places of worship, because reintegration with the Church of England was anticipated. "Habit had accustomed [congregations] to the[ir] existing places of worship" by the time it became clear that Unitarianism would be a separate denomination, "and the domestic influence thus established by association made itself felt" in subsequent chapel architecture.

The Horsham chapel is a "plain, cottage-like building" which forms part of a group of old vernacular buildings on the west side of the Worthing Road—including Horsham's Quaker Friends Meeting House. It has walls of red and blue-grey brick, two storeys and a hipped roof (with a hidden central depression) laid with Horsham Stone tiles. The main façade faces east, and sits on a brickwork plinth with a stone course. A similar band separates the lower and upper storeys. The date of construction is etched in one of the casement windows. The central porch dates from the late 19th century. The rear (west) wall is obscured but retains its original ground-floor paired arched windows and first-floor gallery windows. The north and south walls have single-window ranges; those on the south side are hidden behind the baptistery and vestry built in 1772. These are in the form of a lean-to with a sloping tiled and gabled roof and an arched window. Writing in 1914, one architect stated that "to a casual glance, the chapel ... might very well be a detached private house".

The chapel's interior dimensions are 27 by 37 feet (8.2 m × 11.3 m). Two timber columns of the Doric order, with square bases and decorative capitals, support the roof, which is plastered. A panelled gallery at the north end is held on an octagonal column and retains its original box pews; a matching gallery was removed from the south side during the 19th-century renovations. The original rostrum stood between the two arched windows on the rear (west) wall. The southern extension has two vestries flanking a brick-lined, floor-set baptistery with stone steps. It was fed by a well sunk in the floor of one of the adjacent rooms. The "fine interior" also has monuments to John Dendy (one of the founders) and family members, members of the Gatford family and the Rev. Robert Ashdowne, minister between 1831 and 1861. In the graveyard, an ornate table-tomb to Richard Browne has gadrooning and fluting.

The chapel is set a long way back from the street within its graveyard. At the time of its construction, mistrust of Christian denominations outside the Established (Anglican) Church was still prevalent, and the building intentionally avoided drawing attention to itself or its congregation by being obtrusive. The graveyard survives on three sides, although many monuments were moved or taken away in 1976.

== See also ==
- List of places of worship in Horsham (district)

== Bibliography ==
- Beevers, David; Marks, Richard; Roles, John (1989). Sussex Churches and Chapels. Brighton: The Royal Pavilion, Art Gallery and Museums. ISBN 0-948723-11-4.
- Elleray, D. Robert (2004). Sussex Places of Worship. Worthing: Optimus Books. ISBN 0-9533132-7-1.
- Haines, Susan (2005). Horsham – a History. Chichester: Phillimore & Co. Ltd. ISBN 1-86077-332-X.
- Harris, Roland B. (October 2004). Horsham Historic Character Assessment Report. Sussex Extensive Urban Survey (EUS) (1st ed.). East Sussex County Council, West Sussex County Council and Brighton and Hove City Council.
- Horsham Museum Society; Horsham Photographic Society (2001). Then & Now: Horsham. Stroud: Tempus Publishing Ltd. ISBN 0-7524-2445-9.
- Jones, Ronald P. (1914). Nonconformist Church Architecture (PDF). London: The Lindsey Press.
- Nairn, Ian; Pevsner, Nikolaus (1965). The Buildings of England: Sussex. Harmondsworth: Penguin Books. ISBN 0-14-071028-0.
- Stell, Christopher (2002). Nonconformist Chapels and Meeting-houses in Eastern England. Swindon: English Heritage. ISBN 1-873592-50-7.
- Windrum, Anthony (1978). Horsham: an Historical Survey. Chichester: Phillimore & Co. Ltd. ISBN 0-85033-284-2.
