= Humphrey Wollrich =

English writer (1633–1707)

- Born: c. 1633; Newcastle-under-Lyme, Staffordshire, England
- Died: 31 August 1707; Clerkenwell, London, England
- Other names: Wolrich, Woolrich, Wooldridge
- Occupations: Writer, preacher
- Known for: Quaker religious tracts and activism

Humphrey Wollrich (also Wolrich, Woolrich, or Wooldridge; 1633 – 1707) was an English writer.

== Life ==
From Newcastle-under-Lyme, Staffordshire, he was probably born there about 1633. A Baptist in early life, he joined the Quakers soon after their rise, was imprisoned in London for preaching in 1658, About 1659 Wollrich, although a Quaker, actually baptised a convert. In this he was supported by some in the Society of Friends, while severely judged by others.

Sir Richard Browne, Lord Mayor of London in 1661, who was particularly severe against Quakers, committed Wollrich to prison for keeping his hat on before him. In 1661, he was taken out of a meeting in Staffordshire, and, for refusing the oath of allegiance, carried to prison. On 2 December 1662, he arrived in Chester at the end of the assize. On the following Sunday he entered Chester Cathedral during the anthem, and when the singing ceased attempted to speak, but was hastily removed and confined in the castle.

In February 1682, he was fined £20 and sent to prison for offering prayer at the burial of a quaker woman in her husband's garden at Keel, Staffordshire, the priest having threatened to arrest the corpse if Wollrich did not pay the fees.

Wollrich died in 1707, after a painful illness from cancer in the mouth, at the Friends' Almshouses in Clerkenwell on 31 August 1707, and was buried on 2 September.

== Works ==
In 1659, he wrote 'A Declaration to the Baptists' ... London, 1659. This is an account of a 'dispute' held at Withcock, Leicestershire, on 27 February 1658–9, at which Isabel, wife of Colonel Francis Hacker, was present. In his defence after his bapstising, Wollrich wrote 'The Unlimited God …' London, 1659.

Wollrich was in prison in 1660, and wrote, with John Pennyman and Thomas Coveney, 'Some Grounds and Reasons to manifest the Unlawfulness of Magistrates and others who commit Men to Prison, or fine them for not putting off the hat,' London, 1660 also a broadside dated Newgate Prison, 14 January 1661, 'Oh! London, with thy Magistrates,' with other broadsides against 'Papist Livery,' 'Advice to the Army of the Commonwealth and to Presbyterian Ministers.' During confinement he also wrote 'From the Shepherd of Israel to the Bishops in England,' London [1661–2], and at the same time 'To the King and both Houses of Parliament … a timely warning that they do not make laws against the righteous and innocent people … called quakers,' n.d.; and thee 'Address to Magistrates, Priests, and People of Staffordshire,' n.d.

Other works by him are:

- 'One Warning more to the Baptists, in answer to Matthew Caffin's "Faith in God's Promises the Saints best Weapon",' London, 1661.
- 'A Visitation to the Captive Seed,' London, 1661.
- 'The Rock of Ages Known and Foundation of many Generations Discovered,' London, 1661.
- 'A Visitation and Warning,' London, 1662.
- 'A General Epistle to Friends in England and Holland,' 1665–6; several small epistles and testimonies.
- 'A Brief Testimony against Friends wearing of Perriwigs' (posthumous), 1708.
