= Listed buildings in Morland, Cumbria =

Morland is a civil parish in Westmorland and Furness, Cumbria, England. It contains 13 listed buildings that are recorded in the National Heritage List for England. Of these, one is listed at Grade I, the highest of the three grades, one is at Grade II*, the middle grade, and the others are at Grade II, the lowest grade. The parish contains the village of Morland and the surrounding countryside. Most of the listed buildings are in the village, and they consist of houses and associated structures, farmhouses and farm buildings, and a church and associated structures. Outside the village the listed buildings are a house, a barn, and a bridge.

== Key ==
Grade	Criteria
I	Buildings of exceptional interest, sometimes considered to be internationally important
II*	Particularly important buildings of more than special interest
II	Buildings of national importance and special interest

== Buildings ==
Name and location	Photograph	Date	Notes	Grade
St Laurence's Church; 54.59649°N 2.62353°W		11th century	Aisles were added to the church in the late 12th century, the chancel was rebuilt in 1600, the north aisle was rebuilt in the 18th century, and the church was restored in 1896 by C. J. Ferguson and later the chancel by W. D. Caroe. The church is built in stone and has slate roofs with copings. It has a cruciform plan, consisting of a nave with a south porch, aisles, transepts, a chancel, and a west tower. The tower is the only Anglo-Saxon tower in Cumbria, it has three stages, openings with baluster mullions, a clock face on the west side, and a short lead-covered spire with a weathercock. The fabric of the church has retained some Norman features.	I
Sundial; 54.59634°N 2.62366°W	—	Medieval	The sundial is in the churchyard of St Laurence's Church. The base is medieval and comprises two steps, each consisting of four large blocks. The shaft probably dates from the 19th century, and is square and chamfered. The plate is missing.	II
Altar tomb 54.59654°N 2.62300°W	—	15th century	The altar tomb is in the churchyard of St Laurence's Church. It consists of sandstone blocks with panels that have trefoil heads. In the centre of each side is a shallow niche with an ogee head under a crocketed gable. The slab probably dates from the 18th century, and contains three inscribed brass plates.	II*
Morland House; 54.59602°N 2.62239°W	—	Mid 16th century	A large house that was altered at the end of the 18th century, and largely rebuilt in 1871. It is in stone with quoins, and has a slate roof with stone copings and ball finials. There are two storeys, and the house has an irregular plan, with projecting wings. The main front has six bays, three gables, and a porch. The windows are mullioned, some with transoms, and some with segmental heads. To the north is a wing that has a doorway with a pediment, rusticated quoins, a band, and a projecting summer house. At the southwest is attached a coach house that has openings with segmental heads and hood moulds.	II
Hall Farmhouse and Cottage; 54.59591°N 2.62072°W	—	Late 17th to early 18th century	The house and cottage are in stone, partly on a plinth, with slate roofs and two storeys. The house has an L-shaped plan, with a main block of three bays and a projecting wing to the right. Some windows are mullioned, and others are sashes. The cottage is at right angles on the left. Most of its windows are mullioned, and there are some 20th-century sash and casement windows.	II
Entrance arch and outbuildings, Hall Farm; 54.59603°N 2.62041°W	—	1709	The entrance arch to the farmyard has a segmental head, a pediment and a datestone. The outbuildings are in stone, with quoins and slate roofs, and comprise a threshing barn, byres and a semicircular gin gang. (Note: Street View in March 2010 shows that the buildings have been converted for domestic use.)	II
Gate piers and walls, St Laurence's Church; 54.59633°N 2.62410°W	—	1714	The gate piers are rusticated, and have square, corniced capitals with steps and ball finials. The churchyard walls are also in stone, and contain a doorway with an initialled and dated lintel.	II
Winter House; 54.60890°N 2.61556°W	—	1726	A sandstone house with quoins and a slate roof. There are two storeys and three bays. The central doorway has a chamfered surround, an initialled and dated lintel, and a fanlight. Some of the windows are mullioned and others are sashes, and there is a fire window.	II
Barn, Crossrigg Hall; 54.60797°N 2.61039°W	—	Late 18th to early 19th century	The barn is designed to appear like a cottage, and is in Gothic style. It is built in pebbledashed stone with quoins, and has a slate roof with projecting eaves and two false chimneys. On the west front is a door flanked by windows, and on the north front is another door, all of which have pointed heads and projecting keystones. On the east side is a central segmental-headed wagon door.	II
Hazeldene; 54.59572°N 2.62212°W	—	Late 18th to early 19th century	A stone house with rusticated quoins and a slate roof. There are two storeys, a symmetrical three-bay front, and a 1 1/2-storey extension and a single-storey outbuilding at the rear. The northwest corner of the house is curved where the upper storey overhangs the road. In the centre of the front is a doorway with a rusticated surround, and the windows are sashes in stone surrounds.	II
Wingrove Cottage; 54.59559°N 2.62204°W	—	Late 18th to early 19th century	A stone house with rusticated quoins and an artificial slate roof. There are two storeys, a symmetrical three-bay front, and 20th-century outshut at the rear. The central doorway has a rusticated surround, and a rectangular fanlight with interlaced tracery. The windows are sashes in stone surrounds.	II
Bridge over River Lyvennet; 54.60984°N 2.61147°W		1835	The bridge carries a roadway over the River Lyvennet. It is in cast iron, and has rusticated abutments and end parapets. The bridge consists of a single false four-centred arch with pierced spandrels. The roadway, which is about 10 feet (3.0 m) wide, consists of transverse wooden beams. The parapets and railings are ornately decorative, and at the east end is a wrought iron gate.	II
Wall, railings and gate, Hazeldene and Wingrove Cottage; 54.59571°N 2.62194°W	—	Undated	In front of the gardens is a low stone wall with railings. The railings have cast iron uprights separating sections of wrought iron railings with spearhead standards. The gate is similar and with ogee scroll decoration.	II

== Notes and references ==
=== Sources ===
- Historic England, "Church of St Laurence, Morland (1226108)", National Heritage List for England
- Historic England, "Sundial to south-west of tower of Church of St Laurence, Morland (1226321)", National Heritage List for England
- Historic England, "Altar tomb to south-east of chancel of Church of St Laurence, Morland (1265986)", National Heritage List for England
- Historic England, "Morland House, Morland (1266010)", National Heritage List for England
- Historic England, "Hall Farm; house and adjoining cottage, Morland (1266009)", National Heritage List for England
- Historic England, "Entrance arch, threshing barn, byres, and gin gang to north-east of house at Hall farm, Morland (1226147)", National Heritage List for England
- Historic England, "Gate piers, front and return walls to Church of St Laurence, Morland (1226209)", National Heritage List for England
- Historic England, "Winter House, Morland (1268446)", National Heritage List for England
- Historic England, "Barn in field to south of Crossrigg Hall, Bolton, Morland (1226211)", National Heritage List for England
- Historic England, "Hazeldene, Morland (1226103)", National Heritage List for England
- Historic England, "Wingrove Cottage, Morland (1265926)", National Heritage List for England
- Historic England, "Bridge over river Lyvennet to south of Crossrigg Hall, Morland (1126552)", National Heritage List for England
- Historic England, "Forecourt wall, railings, and gate to front of Hazeldene and Wingrove cottage, Morland (1226156)", National Heritage List for England
- Historic England, Listed Buildings
- Hyde, Matthew; Pevsner, Nikolaus (2010) [1967], Cumbria, The Buildings of England, New Haven and London: Yale University Press, ISBN 978-0-300-12663-1
