= Listed buildings in Sleagill =

Sleagill is a civil parish in Westmorland and Furness, Cumbria, England. It contains two listed buildings that are recorded in the National Heritage List for England. Both the listed buildings are designated at Grade II, the lowest of the three grades, which is applied to "buildings of national importance and special interest". The parish contains the village of Sleagill, and is otherwise rural. The listed buildings consist of two farmhouses, one with an attached farm building.

== Buildings ==
Name and location	Photograph	Date	Notes
Old Mill Flatt Farmhouse; 54.57458°N 2.63257°W	—	Late 16th to early 17th century (probable)	The farmhouse was extended and a floor added in 1666. It is in stone, partly pebbledashed, with quoins, and a Welsh slate roof with some stone-flagged eaves and coping at the south end. There are two storeys and the front facing the farmyard has eight bays. In the southern extension is a doorway with a chamfered surround and an initialled and dated lintel. Most of the windows are casements, the mullions having been removed. Inside the house is a stone spiral staircase.
Midtown Farmhouse with byre 54.56619°N 2.62852°W	—	1670 or earlier	The farmhouse and byre are in stone with quoins, and a Welsh slate roof with stone-flagged eaves and stone coping. There are two storeys, the house has four bays and a rear wing. In the ground floor are a doorway, a sash window, a casement window, and a firewindow, and in the upper floor are three sash windows; all the openings have chamfered surrounds. The byre to the right has three bays, a doorway with a chamfered surround and an initialled and dated lintel, and external steps leading up to a loft door.
