= Littlebeck, Cumbria =

Hamlet in Cumbria, England

Coordinates: 54.572°N 2.582°W

Littlebeck
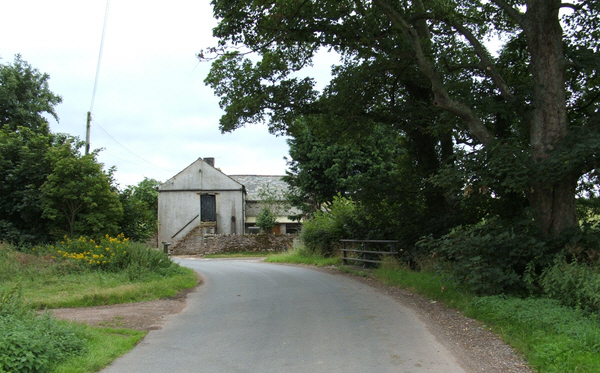
- Littlebeck

- Location in Eden, Cumbria Location within Cumbria
- OS grid reference: NY623198
- Civil parish: Crosby Ravensworth
- Unitary authority: Westmorland and Furness
- Ceremonial county: Cumbria
- Region: North West
- Country: England
- Sovereign state: United Kingdom
- Post town: PENRITH
- Postcode district: CA10
- Dialling code: 01931
- Police: Cumbria
- Fire: Cumbria
- Ambulance: North West
- UK Parliament: Westmorland and Lonsdale

Littlebeck is a hamlet in Westmorland and Furness in the English county of Cumbria, located near the small village of King's Meaburn, the hamlet of Lankaber and the village of Morland. The nearest town is Appleby-in-Westmorland.

Littlebeck farmhouse is a Grade II listed building.
