= Newby, Cumbria =

Village and civil parish in Cumbria, England

Coordinates: 54.585°N 2.630°W

Newby
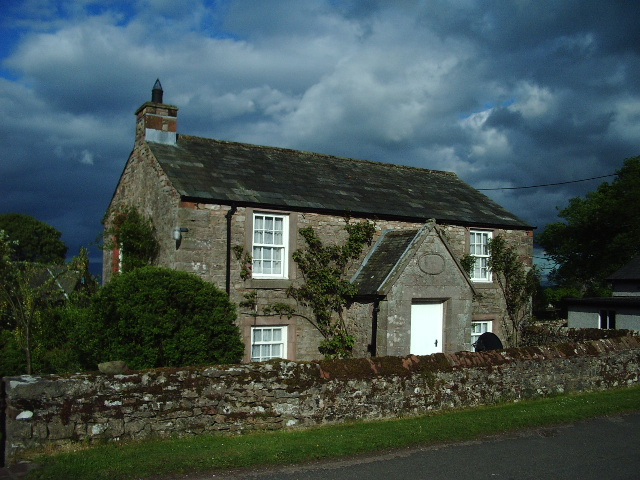
- The former Wesleyan Methodist chapel at Newby Head

- Location in Eden, Cumbria Location within Cumbria
- Population: 164 (2001)
- OS grid reference: NY5921
- Civil parish: Newby
- Unitary authority: Westmorland and Furness
- Ceremonial county: Cumbria
- Region: North West
- Country: England
- Sovereign state: United Kingdom
- Post town: PENRITH
- Postcode district: CA10
- Dialling code: 01931
- Police: Cumbria
- Fire: Cumbria
- Ambulance: North West
- UK Parliament: Westmorland and Lonsdale

Newby is a village and civil parish in the Westmorland and Furness district of the county of Cumbria, England. It is about 7 miles (11 km) from the large town of Penrith and about 5 miles (8 km) from the small town of Appleby-in-Westmorland, and has a population of 164. Nearby is Newby Beck. Newby has a post office. The population at the 2011 Census was less than 100 and data was included with Sleagill.

== Transport ==
For transport there is the A6 road, the A66 road and the M6 motorway a few miles away.

== Nearby settlements ==
Nearby settlements include the large town of Penrith, the small town of Appleby-in-Westmorland and the villages of Morland, King's Meaburn, Cliburn, Sleagill and Newby Head which is part of the village.

== See also ==
- Listed buildings in Newby, Cumbria
