= Morland, Cumbria =

Village and civil parish in Cumbria, England

Coordinates: 54.595°N 2.620°W

Morland
- Village and parish
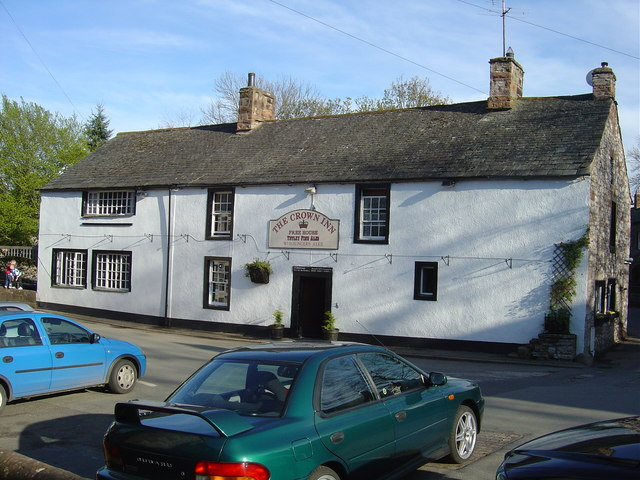
- The Crown Inn

- Location in the former Eden District Location within Cumbria
- Population: 374 (2011)
- OS grid reference: NY5922
- Civil parish: Morland
- Unitary authority: Westmorland and Furness
- Ceremonial county: Cumbria
- Region: North West
- Country: England
- Sovereign state: United Kingdom
- Post town: PENRITH
- Postcode district: CA10
- Dialling code: 01931
- Police: Cumbria
- Fire: Cumbria
- Ambulance: North West
- UK Parliament: Westmorland and Lonsdale

Morland is a village and civil parish in the Westmorland and Furness district, in the ceremonial county of Cumbria, England. It lies within the historic county of Westmorland. The parish includes the hamlets of Town Head and Morland Moor, and had a population of 380 in 2001, reducing marginally to 374 at the 2011 Census.

== Location ==
Morland is centrally located in the rolling hills of the Eden Valley, a scenic, rural area lying a few miles from the Lake District to the west, the Pennines to the east and the Yorkshire Dales to the south. The area is characterised by rolling hills and farmland.

== History ==
Morland is believed to have been settled for at least 1500 years, perhaps because of the Powdonnet Spring that rises by the side of the road leaving the village towards Cliburn. A Viking sword was found buried in the churchyard in the 19th century, which might suggest some Viking influence in the area.

Morland's church, Church of St Lawrence (alt. Laurence), is unique in Cumbria, as it has a Saxon tower.

In the early Middle Ages the area was contested by Strathclyde and Northumbria, and later Scotland and England. Morland was not included in the Domesday Book in 1086, as it was then under the control of Scotland. The area was conquered in 1092 by William Rufus and brought under English control.

Morland House, the Grade II listed former vicarage, dates back to the mid 16th century. It has been owned by the Markham family since 1828.

Morland Hall, on the outskirts of the village, was built in 1861 as a private residence for Francis Atkinson.

== Village Features ==
Morland is built on Morland Beck, which flows through the bottom of the village, and on the hills around it. It is surrounded primarily by farmland, as well as some woodland. Houses in the area are typically built of limestone from nearby quarries.

The village has a pub, the Crown Inn, and the Mill Yard Café, as well as a community shop. It has a primary school, the Morland Area Church of England Primary School, with approximately 60-70 pupils. The villages of Morland and Newby have a shared village hall, in which many activities take place.

The Eden Valley is a popular destination for holidaymakers, and Morland has a significant amount of accommodation for visitors.

== Governance ==
The ecclesiastical parish includes the townships (villages) of King's Meaburn, Newby and Sleagill.

An electoral ward in the same name exists. This ward stretches north to Cliburn with a total population of 1,300.

From 1974 to 2023 it was in Eden district.

== See also ==
- Listed buildings in Morland, Cumbria
