= Matthew Caffyn =

English Baptist preacher and writer

Matthew Caffyn (christened 26 October 1628 – buried June 1714) was an English General Baptist preacher and writer. He is better remembered by the Caffynite Controversy among English General Baptists.

== Early life ==
He was born at Horsham, Sussex, the seventh son of Thomas Caffin, by Elizabeth his wife. (Mark Antony Lower's Worthies of Sussex states incorrectly that his father was German.) According to family tradition, Elizabeth was a direct descendant of a martyr of the Marian Persecutions, possibly John Forman, who was burnt at East Grinstead in 1556. Matthew's father Thomas Caffin was employed by the Onslow family, who owned Drungewick Manor close to the border of Sussex and Surrey. When Matthew was around 7 years old, Richard Onslow adopted him as a companion for his own son Richard. The two boys were educated at a grammar school in Kent and in 1643 both were sent to All Souls College, Oxford to study for the Church of England ministry. However he soon faced difficulties at All Souls College for questioning infant baptism and the Trinity. The university attempted to induce Caffyn to suppress his own views, but failed and he was then expelled in 1645. Now 17, Caffyn returned to Horsham and was installed at Pond Farm in Southwater by his adoptive father. He quickly joined a General Baptist church there, and was appointed assistant to the local Baptist minister, Samuel Lover. Caffyn's apparent campaigning vigour brought about a significant increase in local adherents, and by 1648 he had taken over the ministry from Lover.

== Preaching and alleged heresy ==
Caffyn preached assiduously in Sussex villages, and was five times imprisoned for unauthorised preaching. In 1655 two Quakers from the north, Thomas Lawson and John Slee, were on a mission in Sussex. Lawson had been a beneficed clergyman in Lancashire, known as a botanist. But in his encounter with Caffyn he descended to abuse. Caffyn had expressed his views in a Quakers' meeting at Crawley, and the discussion had been continued on 5 Sep at Caffyn's house near Southwater, just south of Horsham. A pamphlet war resulted. One Baptist participant, Joseph Wright, was removed by an incarceration in Maidstone gaol; and when he came out, Caffyn's heresies seemed to him to require attention rather than those of the Quakers. This later led to serious trouble for Caffyn.

Caffyn was several times prosecuted and fined under the Conventicle Act. By 1677 there was a separation, amicably managed, in a Baptist church at Spilshill, in the parish of Staplehurst, Kent, on account of a difference of opinion regarding the Trinity; a part of the members had embraced the controversial teaching of Caffyn. There was room for latitude in the treatment of this article among the Arminian Baptists, for in their published Standard Confession of March 1660 neither the Trinity nor the Godhead of Christ is perfectly explained. Caffyn did not vent his views in print, but in his preaching he avoided 'unrevealed sublimities,' and in conversation he owned his disagreement with material points in the Athanasian Creed. His views were at least susceptible of an Arian interpretation. Accordingly, Joseph Wright denounced him to the General Assembly of General Baptists in 1691 as denying both the divinity and the humanity of Christ, and moved for his excommunication. What Joshua Toulmin calls Caffyn's 'truly protestant and ingenious defence' satisfied the assembly. Wright returned to the charge in 1693, but again the assembly refused to excommunicate Caffyn. Wright withdrew and protested.

The matter was agitated outside the assembly, and at length the Buckinghamshire and Northamptonshire churches demanded and re-demanded (1699) a further trial, and the assembly agreed to go into the case at Whitsuntide of 1700. They fulfilled this promise by appointing a committee of eight, including four of the complainants, to confer with Caffyn and draw up a healing resolution. The committee were unanimous in offering a declaration which evaded rather than determined the points in dispute; and the assembly recorded its satisfaction with Caffyn's defence.

Just before the next assembly, Christopher Cooper published a reply to 'The Moderate Trinitarian,' &c., 1699, by Daniel Allen, whose work seems to have inspired the mediating policy of the assembly's committee. Cooper charges Caffyn with unsoundness respecting Adam's fall, Christ's satisfaction, and the soul's immortality; he quotes a description of Caffyn's opinions as 'nothing but a fardel of Mahometanism, Arianism, Socinianism, and Quakerism.' At the same time he admits that Caffyn took pains to convert Socinians. He deplores the spread of Caffyn's errors 'in Kent, Sussex, and London, but especially in West Kent.' When an assembly met in 1701 the Northamptonshire churches complained that Caffyn had not been properly trained. The assembly, after debate, affirmed by a large majority that Caffyn's declaration, with his signature to 'the aforesaid expedient,' was sufficient and satisfactory.

The minority seceded, and formed a new connexion under the name of the 'General Association,' branding the majority as 'Caffinites.' But the two parties came together again in 1704; Joseph Wright died in 1703. This is the first deliberate and formal endorsement of latitudinarian opinions in the article of the Trinity by the collective authority of any tolerated section of English dissent.

== Later life and legacy ==
Of Caffyn's career subsequently to 1701 there is no account. He had left Southwater for Broadbridge Heath, some two miles north of Horsham, in an outlying part of the parish of Sullington. Caffyn lived to a patriarchal age, dying in June 1714. He was buried in the churchyard at Itchingfield on 10 June. He was succeeded in the ministry by his eldest son, Matthew.

For the future of the General Baptists, Antitriniarian heresies took possession of the churches in the south of England. The New Connexion of General Baptists was formed, chiefly in the Midlands, by Dan Taylor in 1770, as an offshoot against these heresies, including many Baptist churches that protested the embraced liberalism of the General Assembly. The Assembly arrived at Socinianism (in its modified English form) and became a small remnant. Caffyn's own church at Horsham ceased to be Baptist, and was known as 'Free Christian' from 1879.

== Works ==
Against Caffyn's view Lawson published 'An Untaught Teacher witnessed against, &c.,' 1655. Caffyn retorted in 'The Deceived, and deceiving Quakers discovered, &c.,' 1656, with which was printed a pamphlet by William Jeffery, Baptist minister of Sevenoaks. Caffyn's position is that of a literal believer in external revelation, and he defends such points as the Second coming of Christ and the bodily resurrection against the 'damnable heresies' of the quakers. Lawson made no reply, but the matter was taken up by James Nayler in 'The Light of Christ, &c.,' 1656, (not included in his collected works), and incidentally by George Fox in his 'Great Mistery, &c.,' 1659.

Caffyn reiterated his charges against quaker theology in an appendix to his 'Faith in God's Promises the Saint's best weapon,' 1661, which was briefly answered by Humphrey Wollrich in 'One Warning more to the Baptists,' &c., 1661, and by George Whitehead in an appendix to 'The Pernicious Way, &c.,' 1662. A neighbouring Baptist minister, Joseph Wright of Maidstone, took part in this dispute with the quakers, publishing 'A Testimony for the Son of Man,' &c., 1661. The first to accuse Caffyn (though not by name) of error respecting the person of Christ seems to have been Thomas Monck, in 'A Cure for the cankering Error of the New Eutychians,' 1673.

In addition, Caffyn published: 1. ‘Envy's Bitterness corrected,’ 1674 (?). 2. ‘A raging Wave foaming out its own shame,’ 1675. 3. ‘The Great Error and Mistake of the Quakers.’ 4. ‘The Baptist's Lamentation.’

== Notes and references ==
- Dictionary of National Biography, Caffyn, Matthew (1628–1714), general Baptist minister, by Alexander Gordon. Published 1886.
