= List of works by J. S. Crowther =

List of architectural works

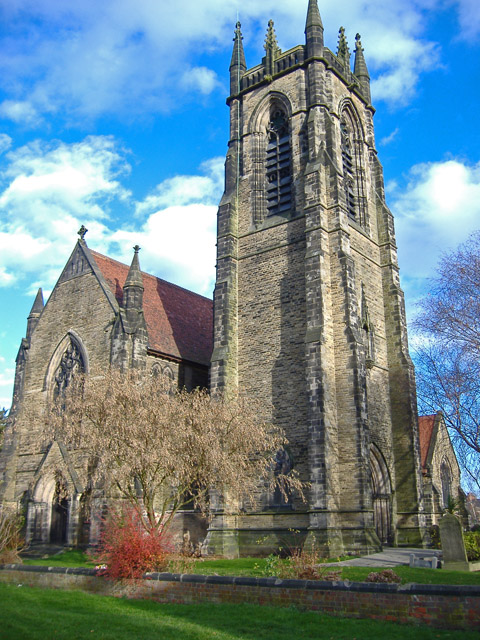
St Nicholas' Church, Beverley

Joseph Stretch Crowther (1820–1893), usually known as J. S. Crowther, was an English architect who practised in Manchester.

Crowther studied under Richard Tattersall from 1838 to 1843. He then worked as a managing clerk for Henry Bowman until 1846, when Bowman took him into partnership; the firm was known as Bowman and Crowther.

Crowther subsequently established an independent practice, designing churches in the Gothic Revival style and villas in a variety of other styles. He was appointed diocesan architect for Manchester Cathedral and was working on its restoration at the time of his death in March 1893.

== Key ==
Grade	Criteria
Grade I	Buildings of exceptional interest.
Grade II*	Particularly important buildings of more than special interest.
Grade II	Buildings of special interest.
"—" denotes a work that is not graded.

== Works ==
Name	Location	Photograph	Date	Notes	Grade
Hyde Chapel	Hyde, Greater Manchester; 53.4375°N 2.0720°W		1846–1848	A Unitarian chapel designed with Henry Bowman.	II
Mill Hill Chapel	Leeds, West Yorkshire; 53.7967°N 1.5465°W		1847–48	A Unitarian chapel designed with Henry Bowman.	II*
St Paul's Church	Portwood, Stockport, Greater Manchester	—	1849–50	A Commissioners' church designed with Henry Bowman. Since demolished.	—
St Lawrence's Church	Crosby Ravensworth, Cumbria; 54.5274°N 2.5865°W		1849–1887	A series of restorations undertaken in conjunction with the incumbent Revd George F. Wilson.	I
Holy Trinity Church	Kendal, Cumbria; 54.3225°N 2.7443°W		1850–1868	Restorations in 1850–52, 1863 and 1868, and design of furnishings.	I
St Philip's Church	Alderley Edge, Cheshire; 53.3044°N 2.2387°W		1851–52	New church; Crowther's first design after leaving his partnership with Henry Bowman.	II*
Redclyffe Grange	Alderley Edge, Cheshire; 53.3008°N 2.2288°W	—	1853	House Crowther built for himself.	II
St Mary's Church	Hulme, Manchester; 53.4613°N 2.2516°W		1853–1858	New church.	II*
School	Alderley Edge, Cheshire; 53.3044°N 2.2398°W	—	1854	A primary school.	II
Holehird	Troutbeck, Cumbria; 54.3996°N 2.9100°W	—	1854	A country house, with later additions. Later a Cheshire Home.	II
Wynlass Beck	Windermere, Cumbria; 54.3859°N 2.9144°W	—	1854	A house for Peter Kennedy.	II
St Colomba's Church	Warcop, Cumbria; 54.5360°N 2.3988°W	—	1854–55	Rebuilt the chancel in Early English style.	I
St Matthew's Church	Stockport, Greater Manchester; 53.4027°N 2.1695°W		1855–1858	New church.	II
St Alban's Church	Manchester	—	1857–1864	New church.	II
St Mary's Church	Windermere, Cumbria; 54.3809°N 2.9103°W		1857–1871	In 1857–58 Crowther added the north aisle and porch, in 1861 the nave was extended, and in 1871 a north transept and a vestry were added.	II
St George's Church	Poynton, Cheshire; 53.3491°N 2.1232°W		1858–59	New church.	II
Oak Farmhouse	Wilmslow, Cheshire; 53.3494°N 2.2505°W	—	c. 1860	Additions to a 16th-century building.	II*
St John the Evangelist's Church	Alvanley, Cheshire; 53.2613°N 2.7547°W		1860–61	New church.	II
St James' Church	Staveley, Cumbria; 54.3801°N 2.8184°W		1861–1865	New church.	—
St Helen's Church	Tarporley, Cheshire; 53.1580°N 2.6691°W		1861–1879	Series of restorations.	II*
Arderne Hall	Tarporley, Cheshire; 53.1617°N 2.6548°W	—	1863	House, demolished in 1958, and replaced.	—
Parkside	Kendal, Cumbria; 54.3219°N 2.7238°W	—	1865	A house for Major Bousfield, M.P.	II
St Mary's Church	Astbury, Cheshire; 53.1507°N 2.2314°W	—	1866	Reredos.	—
St Mary's Church	Bury, Greater Manchester; 53.5940°N 2.2970°W		1872–1876	Crowther replaced the Georgian body of the church with one in Gothic Revival style. He also probably designed the screen between the chapel and the chancel.	II
St Wilfrid's Church	Northenden, Manchester; 53.4071°N 2.2535°W		1873–1876	When Crowther was asked to undertake repairs, he found that there were no foundations under the body of the church. He replaced this in a similar design, leaving the Perpendicular tower unaltered.	II*
St Nicholas' Church	Beverley, East Yorkshire; 53.8413°N 0.4147°W		1877–1880	New church.	II
St Bartholomew's Church	Wilmslow, Cheshire; 53.3301°N 2.2296°W		1878	Added a vestry and a porch.	I
St Benedict's Church	Ardwick, Manchester; 53.4694°N 2.2040°W		1880	New church.	II*
Eccle Riggs	Broughton-in-Furness, Cumbria; 54.2705°N 3.2114°W	—	1880	Addition of a dining-room wing to a house built in 1865 for Richard Assheton Cross, designed by E. G. Paley. It has later been used as a leisure club.	—
St Thomas' Church	Werneth, Greater Manchester; 53.5347°N 2.1229°W	—	1880s	Made additions including a choir vestry and an organ chamber.	II
St Mary's Church	Stockport, Greater Manchester; 53.4112°N 2.1555°W		1880–1882	Alterations, including to the west window. Crowther also designed the furnishings in the chancel and choir at this time.	I
St Chad's Church	Poulton-le-Fylde, Lancashire; 53.8472°N 2.9921°W		1881–1883	Alterations.	II*
St Michael and All Angels' Church	Ashton-under-Lyne, Greater Manchester; 53.4877°N 2.0897°W		1881–1889	Rebuilt the west tower and refitted the chancel.	I
St Bartholomew's Church	Appleby, North Lincolnshire; 53.6235°N 0.5603°W		1882	Restoration.	II*
St George's Church	Hulme, Manchester; 53.4721°N 2.2593°W		1884	Restoration of a Commissioners' church, built between 1826 and 1828 and designed by Francis Goodwin.	II*
St Chad's Church	Rochdale, Greater Manchester; 53.6147°N 2.1577°W		1884–1885	Chancel rebuilt and extended.	II*
Manchester Cathedral	Manchester; 53.4853°N 2.2443°W		1885–86	Restoration.	I
St Mary's Church	Lymm, Cheshire; 53.3771°N 2.4784°W		1888–1890	Tower rebuilt.	II
St Andrew's Church	Eccles, Greater Manchester; 53.4851°N 2.3422°W		1889	Added the tower.	II*
Holy Trinity Church	Littleborough, Greater Manchester; 53.6443°N 2.0939°W		1889	Added the chancel.	II
St Wilfrid's Church	Mobberley, Cheshire; 53.3182°N 2.3161°W		1889–	Started restoration; completed after his death by W. D. Caroe.	I
St John's Church	Scunthorpe, North Lincolnshire; 53.5923°N 0.6416°W		1890	New church for Rowland Winn, Lord Oswald.	II*
