= Listed buildings in Crosby Ravensworth =

Crosby Ravensworth is a civil parish in Westmorland and Furness, Cumbria, England. It contains 53 buildings that are recorded in the National Heritage List for England. Of these, one is listed at Grade I, the highest of the three grades, six are at Grade II*, the middle grade, and the others are at Grade II, the lowest grade. The parish contains the villages of Crosby Ravensworth, Maulds Meaburn, Reagill, the small settlement of Oddendale, and the surrounding countryside. Most of the listed buildings are country houses, smaller houses, and associated structures, farmhouses and farm buildings. The other listed buildings include a church and items in the churchyard, bridges, monuments, a village hall, and a parish boundary stone.

== Key ==
Grade	Criteria
I	Buildings of exceptional interest, sometimes considered to be internationally important
II*	Particularly important buildings of more than special interest
II	Buildings of national importance and special interest

== Buildings ==
Name and location	Photograph	Date	Notes	Grade
St Lawrence's Church; 54.52742°N 2.58643°W		c. 1200	The oldest part of the church is the crossing, and the south doorway dates from the 13th century. The church was largely rebuilt in 1811–12 by George Gibson, possibly advised by Robert Smirke, and further alterations were made between 1848 and 1887 by J. S. Crowther. The church is built in stone and has slate roofs with stone copings and gable crosses. It consists of a nave with a clerestory, aisles, a south porch, transepts, a chancel, and a west tower. The tower has three stages, a northwest stair turret, and an embattled parapet.	I
Cross stump 54.52725°N 2.58648°W	—	Medieval	The stump of a churchyard cross is in the churchyard of St Lawrence's Church. It is in stone and is about 10 feet (3.0 m) high. There is a large rectangular base and a rectangular socket, in which is a tapering chamfered shaft with dog-tooth decoration.	II
Crake Trees; 54.53383°N 2.59529°W		14th century (probable)	Originally a tower house with a hall and a solar block, it was extended probably in the 16th or 17th century, but is now roofless and a ruin. What remains includes some standing walls, two storeys of the tower, including a barrel vault, some windows, part of a staircase, and some fireplaces.	II
Crosby Ravensworth Hall; 54.52757°N 2.58743°W	—	Mid 16th century	The house was remodelled in the mid 19th century. It is in stone with slate roofs, partly hipped. There are two storeys, a T-shaped plan, and a front of four bays. The windows are mullioned with pointed lights, and have chamfered surrounds and hood moulds.	II
Reagill Grange; 54.54666°N 2.60787°W		Late 16th century (probable)	The house, on land previously owned by Shap Abbey, was extended in 1700. It is in stone, it has an L-shaped plan, and there are two storeys and four bays. The original part is on a boulder plinth, the front is pebbledashed, there are quoins, and the roof is slated with stone copings. On the front is a two-storey porch that has a door with a chamfered surround. The windows vary and there are hood moulds. Inside the house is an inglenook.	II*
Maulds Meaburn Hall; 54.54745°N 2.58269°W	—	Late 16th century (probable)	The house has a complicated history. It is in stone with slate roofs, and is mainly in two storeys with attics. The house has an asymmetrical plan, including a main block with gabled wings at both ends. The windows vary, and there is a doorway with a chamfered surround and a dated lintel. Inside are many original features, including a stone spiral staircase.	II*
Barn and byre range north of Gilts farmhouse 54.50070°N 2.57801°W	—	17th century (probable)	The farm building is in stone on a plinth, with quoins and a slate roof with stone copings. It has a single storey, and contains a doorway with a chamfered surround, a small casement window, and a blocked owl hole.	II
Meaburn Hill farmhouse 54.53830°N 2.58109°W	—	Mid 17th century (probable)	The farmhouse was extended to the north in 1798. It is in stone, the south return is rendered, and the roof is slated with stone coping on the south gable. The house has a double-pile plan and two storeys, the original part has three bays, and the extension has two. The doorway is in the extension and has a moulded surround and an initialled and dated lintel. The windows vary, and some have been altered.	II
Monks' Bridge; 54.52802°N 2.58503°W		17th century (probable)	The bridge carries a road over the River Lyvennet. It is in stone, and consists of two segmental arches, each with a span of about 18 feet (5.5 m), and with a central cutwater. The roadway is about 8 feet (2.4 m) wide, and there are low parapets.	II
Oddendale Old Hall and cart-shed 54.51434°N 2.62942°W	—	17th century	The house was extended in the 19th century. It is in stone on a boulder plinth, with quoins and a slate roof. There are three storeys, seven bays, and a left outshut. On the front is a gabled porch containing a bench. Most of the windows are mullioned, some have chamfered surrounds, and some have hood moulds. The outshut contains a rear segmental-headed cart entrance. Inside the house is an inglenook.	II
Ploverigg farmhouse 54.54250°N 2.63168°W	—	17th century (possible)	The farmhouse was remodelled in 1778, and a bay was added in the 19th century. It is in stone with quoins and a slate roof. There are two storeys and four bays, on the front is a gabled porch, and the windows are sashes.	II
School House, barn and byre 54.54290°N 2.58147°W	—	17th century	The house and outbuildings are in stone with quoins and slate roofs. The house has two storeys, three bays and an outshut. In the centre is a doorway, and the windows are mullioned with chamfered surrounds. The byre to the right has two bays, casement windows, and a door. The barn to the left has two bays, a wagon opening and a smaller door.	II
Monks' Bridge house 54.52782°N 2.58514°W	—	1666	Originally a school, it was remodelled in 1784, and has since been used as a house. It is in ashlar stone on a chamfered plinth, with rusticated quoins, and a green slate roof with stone copings. The house is in a single storey and has a T-shaped plan. The doorway has a pedimented architrave with inscriptions in the lintel and on the frieze. The windows have semicircular heads, impost blocks and keystones. On the west gable is a bellcote, and on the east gable is a finial.	II
Oddendale Hall and byre 54.51453°N 2.62752°W	—	Late 17th century (probable)	The oldest part of the farmhouse is the rear wing, the front block being added in the 18th century. In the 19th century the house was extended to the rear with a rear wing, and a byre was added to the right. The building is in stone with a slate roof. The house is pebbledashed with quoins, and has two storeys and five bays. On the front is a gabled porch with side benches. Most of the windows are mullioned, and some are sashes or casements. The byre has a door, a casement window, and steps leading up to a loft door.	II
Barn and byre, southwest of Gilts farmhouse 54.50026°N 2.57836°W	—	1675	The barn is the older, the byre is dated 1706. They are in stone with quoins and slate roofs, and there is a rear outshut. Both have doors with dated lintels, and openings, some with chamfered surrounds. The barn has two storeys and five bays, and the byre to the west has one storey and two bays.	II
Barnskew farmhouse, byre and barn 54.56307°N 2.58679°W	—	1676	The house was extended and the outbuildings were added in the 18th century, and all are in stone with slate roofs. The house is pebbledashed with quoins, two storeys and six bays. The windows are mixed, some mullioned, some sashes, and others casements. The byre to the left has two storeys, four windows in the ground floor and external steps to two loft doors. The barn to the right has an L-shaped plan, a large wagon entrance, a door, a casement window, and ventilation slits.	II
Walls and gate piers, Maulds Meaburn Hall; 54.54757°N 2.58214°W	—	c. 1676 (probable)	Around the garden are drystone walls with chamfered copings about 6 feet (1.8 m) high. The square gate piers are in rusticated blocks, and are about 12 feet (3.7 m) high. They have scrolled decoration on the plinths, and moulded caps and ball finials.	II*
Gilts farmhouse 54.50051°N 2.57800°W	—	1680	The farmhouse, which was later extended by two bays, is in stone with quoins and a slate roof. The house has two storeys, six bays, and a rear wing. The doorway has a chamfered surround and a dated and initialled lintel. The windows in the original part are mullioned, now blocked, and a fire window, all under a continuous hood mould. The other windows are horizontal-sliding sashes.	II
Dryevers farmhouse with coach-house, walls, railings, and gate 54.55101°N 2.54979°W	—	1682 (probable)	The coach house and other structures were probably added to the farmhouse in the 18th century. The house is in stone and has a slate roof with stone copings. There are two storeys, five bays, and outshuts at the rear. On the front is a door and an elliptical-headed coach entrance. The windows are mullioned with sashes. At the rear is a doorway with an elaborate chamfered surround and an initialled and dated lintel. The forecourt wall is low with segmental copings, wrought iron railings and a gate. There are end and gate piers that are rusticated and have finials.	II
Village Hall, Reagill; 54.55040°N 2.61357°W		1684	Originally a school, the hall is in stone with quoins, and it has a green slate roof with stone coping on the north gable. It has one storey and three bays. On the east side is a porch, and above the inner door is a lintel with an inscription, initials, and dates. Most windows are mullioned. In the north gable end is a re-used three light window, and on the apex is a bellcote.	II
Two summer houses, Maulds Meaburn Hall; 54.54704°N 2.58217°W	—	c. 1700	A pair of single-storey square pavilions at the corners of the bowling green to the south of the hall. They are in stone, each with an eaves cornice, a string course on the front, a hipped pyramidal slate roof, and a cellar at the rear. The east building has fixed glazing, and the west building is unglazed.	II*
East farmhouse, barn and pigsty 54.56587°N 2.57181°W	—	Late 17th to early 18th century (possible)	The buildings are in stone with quoins and slate roofs, and form an H-shaped plan. The house and barn have two storeys, and the house has three bays. The windows are casements with chamfered surrounds and mullions. In the barn are wagon doors, winnowing doors, and ventilation slits. The pigsty has a single storey, and contains doors and a blocked feeding hole.	II
Yew Tree Farmhouse, outbuildings, walls and sculptures 54.55238°N 2.61414°W		Early 18th century	The farmhouse was extended in the early 19th century and from about 1836 a terraced garden was created containing sculptures and other structures. The farmhouse and outbuildings are in rendered sandstone with roofs of Westmorland slate, and they form a T-shaped plan. The wall surrounds the garden and it contains niches in its inner face. The sculptures include human figures, reclining lions, and urns.	II
Ravens' Seat farmhouse barn and cart shed 54.52729°N 2.58212°W	—	1730	The barn and cart shed were later additions to the farmhouse, and are all in stone with slate roofs. The house has two storeys, a symmetrical front of three bays, and a rear wing. In the centre is a gabled porch that has a side door above which is an inscribed and dated lintel. The windows are mullioned and contain casements with segmental-headed lights. The barn to the right has two storeys and four bays, and contains a doorway with a chamfered surround, two casement windows, and ventilation slits. To the left is a single-storey cart house with two bays and a wagon entrance at the rear.	II
Littlebeck Cottage and byre 54.57214°N 2.58267°W	—	Early to mid 18th century	The house and byre are in rendered stone with slate roofs and have two storeys. The house has three bays and a rear wing. The windows are mullioned and contain sashes. The byre to the right has a door, two windows in the upper floor, and external steps leading up to a doorway in the right return.	II
Roadbridge over Dalesbank Beck; 54.52740°N 2.58534°W	—	18th century (probable)	The bridge is in stone and consists of a single segmental arch with a span of about 15 feet (4.6 m). The road way is about 12 feet (3.7 m) wide. The parapets are about 2.5 feet (0.76 m) high, they have splayed ends, and flat copings.	II
The Green; 54.54087°N 2.58098°W	—	18th century (probable)	A stone house with a slate roof, it has two storeys and three bays and a lean-to extension at the south end. In the upper floor are two horizontally-sliding sash windows, and the other windows are casements. All the openings have stone surrounds.	II
Trainlands farmhouse with byre 54.55244°N 2.56322°W	—	1755	The farmhouse and byre are in stone with slate roofs. The house has two storeys, five bays, and a rear wing. The doorway has an elliptical head, and a dated and initialled lintel. Some windows are mullioned, and others are horizontally-sliding sashes. The byre to the right has three bays, three doors, steps leading to a loft door, a rear outshut, and a lean-to on the side.	II
West farmhouse, barn and byre ranges 54.56591°N 2.57221°W	—	1755	The house is dated 1755, the range to the right is earlier, and the range to the left is later. They are all in stone with quoins, outshuts to the rear, two storeys, and slate roofs. The house has a symmetrical three-bay front with a central door and windows that are mullioned with chamfered surrounds and three lights, the central light being a sash and the outer lights fixed. The outer ranges have various openings, including wagon entrances, windows, and loft doors.	II
Fell Gate farmhouse and garage 54.51994°N 2.58718°W	—	1759	The building is in stone with a slate roof. The house has two storeys, three bays, and a lean-to extension to the right. On the front is a central gabled porch and casement windows, and above the door is a segmental-headed initialled datestone. To the left a former byre has been converted into a garage.	II
Barn and byre ranges, Ploverigg Farm; 54.54213°N 2.63138°W	—	1763	The farm buildings are in stone with quoins, and they have hipped slate roofs. There are two storeys, and the buildings are in an L-shaped plan, with ranges of four and ten bays. The openings include doors, a casement window, a cart entrance with a segmental head, and three loft doors. There is a dovecote under the eaves, and external steps leading to a first floor door.	II
Oddendale and barns 54.51473°N 2.62858°W	—	1776	A farmhouse flanked by barns in stone with quoins and a slate roof. They are in two storeys and overall have five bays. In the house, above the door is a dated and initialled lintel. The door and windows have stone surrounds, and the windows are mullioned. The left barn has a doorway, a loft door, ventilation slits and a wagon entrance at the rear. The right barn has a fixed window, and at the rear is a segmental-headed wagon entrance with a loft door above.	II
Jenny Well house and barn 54.52503°N 2.58797°W	—	1784	The house was extended and remodelled in Gothic style in the 19th century. The house and barn are in stone with quoins, and have slate roofs, the house also has coped gables. The house has two storeys, and a T-shaped plan, with a four bay main range and a cross-wing. On the front is a gabled porch and a doorway with a four-centred head, and to the left is a two-storey canted bay window. The windows are casements with mullions, and some also have transoms. The barn has a single storey and contains a wagon entrance, a blocked doorway, a casement window, and ventilation slits.	II
Barn, byre, and storage ranges, Flass House; 54.53465°N 2.57621°W	—	Late 18th to early 19th century	A group of buildings around a courtyard; the west range is the oldest, and the other were added around 1850. They are in stone with quoins and hipped slate roofs. The west and east ranges have two storeys, the other ranges being lower. They contain various openings, including a large wagon entrance, doors, windows and ventilation slits.	II
Coach-house, stable, and tack room, Flass House; 54.53444°N 2.57646°W	—	Late 18th to early 19th century	The coach-house, stable, and tack room are in stone with quoins and hipped slate roofs. The stable has two storeys and three bays, with a coach entrance on the left, a stable entrance on the right, and windows. To the south is a single-storey single-bay tack room. All the entrances have elliptical heads, and the windows are sashes.	II
Gibson Memorial; 54.52751°N 2.58560°W	—	c. 1811 (probable)	The memorial is in the churchyard of St Lawrence's Church. It is in stone, about 5 feet (1.5 m) high, and consists of a crocketed pinnacle that has panels with names on the sides. The memorial is in an enclosure that has a plinth about 3 feet (0.91 m) high with wrought iron railings and cast iron urns on the corners.	II
Meaburn Lodge; 54.54217°N 2.58070°W	—	1834	Originally a school, later used as a house, it is in stone with rusticated quoins and a slate roof. There is a single storey, three bays, outshuts at the rear, and a lower porch to the left. The doorway has a chamfered surround and a pointed head, and the windows are triple lancets under rectangular hood moulds.	II
Garden structure south of Yew Tree Farm; 54.55186°N 2.61399°W	—	c. 1836	An irregular structure in sandstone with a roughly rectangular plan, it contains a deep arched recess, flights of steps, walls with sculpture, and an urn on a plinth.	II
Garden structure southeast of Yew Tree Farm; 54.55220°N 2.61383°W	—	c. 1836	An irregular structure in sandstone with a roughly rectangular plan, it contains a deep arched recess, flights of steps, walls with sculpture, and an urn on a plinth.	II
Britannia Monument and walls 54.48203°N 2.65195°W		1842	The monument was erected to commemorate the accession to the throne of Queen Victoria in 1837. It is in ashlar stone, about 30 feet (9.1 m) high, and surrounded by a low wall. The monument consists of a square plinth about 6 feet (1.8 m) high on two steps, and on the plinth is a tapering octagonal column with a cornice on which is a life-size standing figure of Britannia. On the sides of the plinth are an inscription, a coat of arms, and sculptures in bas-relief.	II
Smithy; 54.53840°N 2.57750°W	—	1844	The former smithy is in stone with quoins and a slate roof. There is a single storey, two bays, small outbuildings at the rear, and fixed windows. Above the doorway is a decorated lintel with initials and a date. Above this is a sculpture in bas-relief, and elsewhere are decoratively carved stones.	II
Holesfoot House; 54.55011°N 2.55598°W	—	c. 1845	The house is in ashlar stone on a plinth, with rusticated quoins, an eaves cornice, and slate roofs. It is symmetrical, with a two-storey three-bay main block flanked by single-storey single-bay wings. In the centre is a Doric porch and a doorway with an architrave and a traceried fanlight. This is flanked by canted bay windows. All the windows are sashes, and in the roof is a central dormer.	II*
Dent tombs 54.52734°N 2.58604°W	—	1847	The two tombs to members of the Dent family are in the churchyard of St Lawrence's Church. They are in stone and each consists of a low plinth, a ridged slab, a footstone, and a larger marble headstone containing an inscription and a coat of arms. They are surrounded by cast iron railings about 2 feet (0.61 m) high with coats of arms and ball finials.	II
Coal storage and cascade, Flass House; 54.53475°N 2.57711°W	—	c. 1850	The coal store to the south of the house is screened by a cascade. The water emerges from a segmental-arched recess, and a passes over clam shells into a small pool. It is enclosed by wall about 2 feet (0.61 m) high with flat copings.	II
Gate piers, Flass House; 54.53545°N 2.57665°W	—	c. 1850 (probable)	The gate piers are at the entrance to the drive. They are in ashlar stone, square, and about 10 feet (3.0 m) high. Each pier is banded, with a recess, a dentilled cornice, and a flat top with an animal head.	II
Well head 54.53641°N 2.57746°W	—	c. 1850	The well head was built as a garden feature in the grounds of Flass House. It is in rusticated ashlar on a moulded plinth, and has a circular plan. The well head is about 5 feet 6 inches (1.68 m) high, and has a cornice and a domed top. There is a wooden door, carved to imitate masonry.	II
Footbridge over Dalesbank Beck; 54.52710°N 2.58639°W		19th century (probable)	The bridge is in stone and consists of a single segmental arch with a span of about 6 feet (1.8 m). The pathway is about 4 feet (1.2 m) wide. The parapets are about 2 feet (0.61 m) high and have splayed ends.	II
Hearse house 54.52795°N 2.58535°W	—	Mid 19th century	The hearse house is in the corner of the churchyard of St Lawrence's Church. It is in stone with quoins and has a slate roof with moulded copings. There is one storey and two bays. On the road side are two doors in chamfered surrounds with a timber lintel, and on the side of the churchyard is a wagon door and a smaller door.	II
Parish boundary stone 54.57241°N 2.58244°W	—	Mid 19th century (probable)	The boundary stone is a narrow block of sandstone with a segmental head and chamfered edges. On its sides are carved the parish names "KINGS MEABURN" and "MAULDS MEABURN".	II
Charles II Monument; 54.49920°N 2.61801°W		c. 1851	Also known as Black Dub, the monument was erected to commemorate the occasion in 1651 when Charles II drank from the source of the River Lyvennet. It is in stone, and consists of two steps, a base, and a squat blunt obelisk. On the four sides of the base are an inscription, and bas-reliefs depicting a bust of Charles II, a crown, and a lion.	II
Flass House; 54.53507°N 2.57710°W		1851–53	A country house in Palladian style. It is stuccoed with string courses, rusticated pilasters, projecting eaves, and a slate roof. The house has an asymmetrical plan, it is mainly in two storeys with attics, and has an off-centre three storey tower. The main front has four bays, and there is a Doric porte-cochère.	II*
Spa Well Pavilion and pump head 54.48087°N 2.65279°W		Mid to late 19th century (probable)	The pavilion is to the north of the Spa Wells Hotel, and covers the pump-head of a well. It is an open octagonal structure with wooden uprights on chamfered octagonal stone plinth blocks. These support a pyramidal slate roof with a pointed finial. The pump-head is on an octagonal stone pillar that rises to become a basin.	II
Footbridge over Lyvennet Beck; 54.53644°N 2.57778°W	—	Late 19th century (probable)	The footbridge is a feature in the garden of Flass House, and is in ashlar stone with voussoirs. The bridge has a main segmental arch with a span of about 25 feet (7.6 m) between cutwaters. There are two small semicircular arches over tributaries on the west side, and one on the east side.	II
