= Flass =

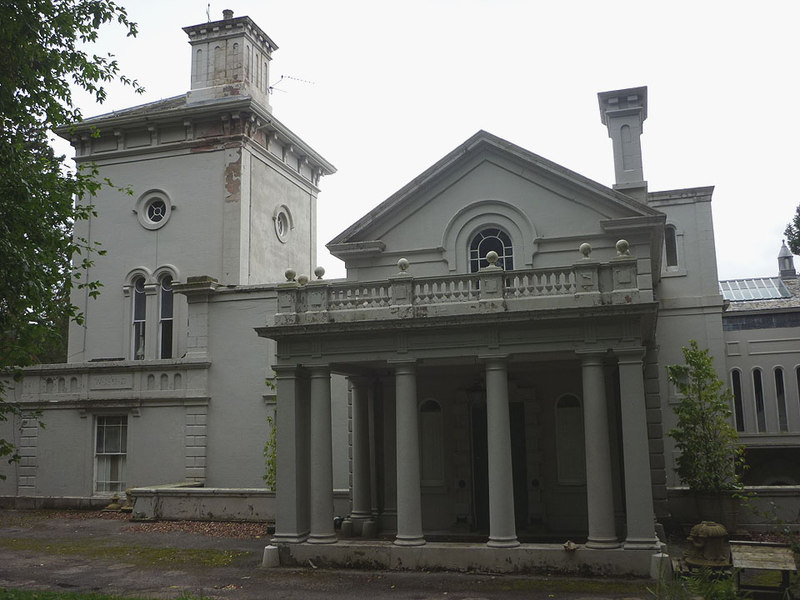
- The east side of Flass, pictured in 2011
- Interactive map of the Flass area

General information
- Status: Grade II* listed
- Type: Mansion
- Architectural style: Neo-Palladian, Italianate
- Location: Maulds Meaburn, Cumbria, England
- Coordinates: 54°32.10′N 2°34.63′W

Flass, also called Flass House, is a large Grade II* listed house near the village of Maulds Meaburn, Cumbria, England. It was built in the 19th century in the Neo-Palladian style by the tea and opium traders Lancelot and Wilkinson Dent of Dent & Co. It remained in the hands of the Dent family until 1972, when it was sold to the historian Frank Welsh. It was sold again in 1982 to the solicitor Malcolm Whiteside, who temporarily ran the property as a care home. In 2000, the musician Christine Holmes and her husband Paul Davies bought the property. The pair divorced, and, in 2012, it was discovered that the property had been used by a criminal gang for the cultivation of cannabis. Six men, including Davies, were jailed in 2015. Holmes took control of the property, which was sold at auction in 2019.

== Architecture ==
Flass is set in a 15-acre estate in the Eden Valley, near the village of Maulds Meaburn. The house is in Palladian, or Italianate style. It is built in limestone that is partly rendered, and all is whitewashed; the roofs are slated. The house has an asymmetrical plan, and is in two storeys with attics. There is a string course between the storeys. The west (garden) front of the main part of the house is symmetrical, and in four bays. The lower storeys of the outer bays project forward, have flat roofs, and contain a three-light window on the front and French windows on the sides. Above each of the projecting bays is another three-light window, over which is a cornice and a small Diocletian window in a pedimented gable, this giving the semblance of a Venetian window. In the central two bays are casement windows. At the top of the house is a dentilled cornice and projecting eaves. The east front contains a Doric porte-cochère, and to the left of this is a three-storey tower. The remainder of the house is two-storey with attics.

On 6 February 1963, the building was designated as a Grade II* listed building.

== Construction ==
Flass was rebuilt in the mid-19th century, apparently incorporating elements of a previous house which likely dated to the 18th century, likely a yeoman farmer's home. It was built for Lancelot and Wilkinson Dent, though construction may have been started by their sister. The Dent brothers were the wealthy owners of Dent & Co., a company trading tea and opium. The process was initially overseen by an architect named Mr Gray, but, around 1854, a Mr G. Mair took over. The Dents' business was based in Hong Kong, and the interiors of the house were originally designed to resemble those of houses at the treaty ports in the East. Luxurious decoration included plasterwork frieze with pearls in the ballroom, marble fireplaces and ivory doorhandles. The house was furnished by the Lancaster-based firm Gillow's, though the Dents also brought furniture from the East.

The name Flass comes from a Middle English word meaning "lake" or "marsh". When the house was originally built, it is likely that the nearby River Lyvennet "took a more aggressive course through the 15-acre grounds".

== History ==
Flass remained in the hands of the Dent family until Sir Robert Dent and Lady Elspeth Dent sold it to the historian Frank Welsh for £17,000 in 1973. Robert Dent, shortly before selling the house, broke into an attic he had not visited. There, he found a number of items, including 16th-century statuettes from the Mughal Empire left behind by his ancestors. These were subsequently sold for £220,000. Welsh attempted to furnish the house in its original style, and many original features, including paintings, remained in the 1990s. Some had been moved, including an antique bed held in the Durham University Museum of Oriental Art.

Flass was purchased from Welsh in 1982 for £115,000 by the retired solicitor Malcolm Whiteside, who ran the property as a care home with his wife, Mary. A change in fire legislation in 1991 meant that this was no longer possible, and the house was put up for sale again; Whiteside still owned the house in the late 1990s, when it was on sale for around £750,000 (1997) or £650,000 (1998). It was sold in 2000 to the musician Christine Holmes and her husband Paul Davies for £490,000. The couple subsequently divorced, with Davies retaining control of Flass.

In the early 2010s, it was available to purchase or rent as "totally private and hidden away, with an unmatched seclusion and charm". However, in 2012, police discovered that a criminal gang had sealed off the rooms of the house to cultivate cannabis. Neighbours became suspicious because of the limited activity in the house and the sound of generators. Police observed and subsequently raided the property, finding equipment, compost, and a large "mother" plant. Six men, including Davies, were jailed for a total of nearly 40 years in 2015.

Holmes took control of the property, spending £200,000 on renovations, but failing to sell the property at £1,500,000 in 2014. The house became popular with urban explorers, leading to widely viewed videos being posted online and prosecutions for burglary. The house, then derelict, was repossessed by the bank and sold at auction in 2019, with a guide price of £460,000. Renovations are ongoing.

== See also ==
- Grade II* listed buildings in Westmorland and Furness
