= Reagill =

Hamlet in Cumbria, England

Coordinates: 54.551°N 2.614°W

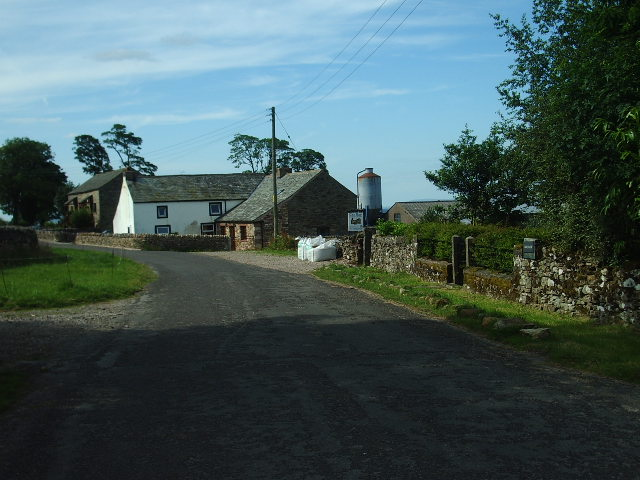
- Reagill

- Location in Eden, Cumbria Location within Cumbria
- Population: 55
- OS grid reference: NY602174
- Civil parish: Crosby Ravensworth
- Unitary authority: Westmorland and Furness
- Ceremonial county: Cumbria
- Region: North West
- Country: England
- Sovereign state: United Kingdom
- Post town: PENRITH
- Postcode district: CA10
- Dialling code: 01931
- Police: Cumbria
- Fire: Cumbria
- Ambulance: North West
- UK Parliament: Westmorland and Lonsdale

Reagill is a hamlet in the parish of Crosby Ravensworth, in the Westmorland and Furness district, in the English county of Cumbria, England. Its closest major settlements are Shap, Appleby-in-Westmorland, and Penrith. Nearby lies the village of Sleagill.

== History ==
Reagill was formerly called Renegill. The oldest building in the village is Reagill Grange, of which construction commenced in the 17th century. The Grange is a typical example of 17th–18th century English rural architecture, weatherproofed simply with lime-based render, and consisting of several wings all of different ages. It is still the principal building in the village, a family home as well as being a venue for gatherings of the villagers.

Reagill was the home of artist and sculptor Thomas Bland in the 18th century. Bland was well known at the time for his eccentric nature. His work is abundant in the local area, most notably his image garden in the centre of the village, which contains a wealth of carvings, and a carving of Queen Victoria at the nearby Shap Wells Hotel.

== See also ==
- Listed buildings in Crosby Ravensworth
