= Lancelot Dent =

British opium trader

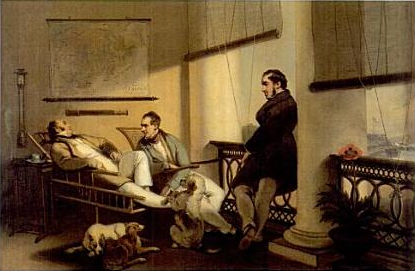
Dent's verandah, showing French merchant Durant on a rattan chair, W.C. Hunter, and Captain William Hall, by George Chinnery

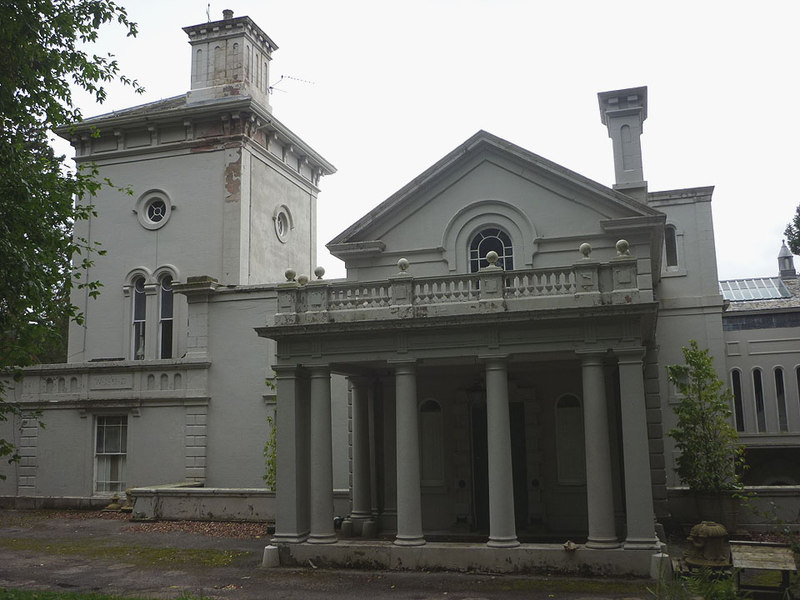
The east side of Dent's English home, Flass, in 2011

Lancelot Dent was a 19th-century British merchant resident for a period in Canton, China who dealt primarily in opium.

He was christened on August 4, 1799, in Crosby Ravensworth, Westmorland, England, son of William and Jane (Wilkinson) Dent.

Lancelot took over as senior partner of trading house Dent & Co. headquartered in Canton, when his brother Thomas departed the company in 1831. He had a powerful hold over some agency houses buying opium from the Calcutta auction, including Carr, Tagore and Company, managed by Bengali merchant Dwarkanath Tagore.

Together with Thomas, Lancelot commissioned construction of Flass House, now a grade two listed building in the Palladian style, on land inherited from their sister in England's northern Lake District. The property would remain in the Dent family until 1972, when it was sold to banker, historian and writer Frank Welsh.

Lancelot and John Dent were consuls of Italy in Hong Kong.

Lancelot had a son, John Dent Fish born 1828 in Macau, with Mary Colledge, the sister of Thomas Richardson Colledge. She later married Captain John Fish and her son adopted his stepfather's surname, but Lancelot was listed as the father in documents.

Dent died in London on 28 November 1853 aged 54 and buried at St Lawrence's Church Crosby Ravensworth Cumbria

== See also ==
- Anglo-Chinese relations

This new book about one of Lancelot Dent's close friends, Thomas Richardson Colledge, features interesting facts about Lancelot Dent
