= St Lawrence's Church, Crosby Ravensworth =

Coordinates: 54.5274°N 2.5865°W

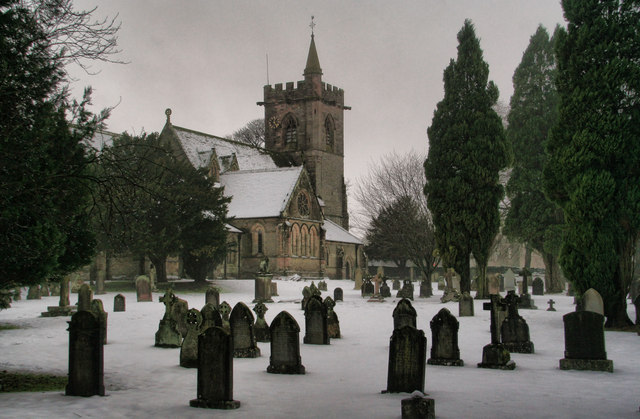
- St Lawrence's Church, Crosby Ravensworth, from the northeast

- Location in Cumbria
- OS grid reference: NY 621 148
- Location: Crosby Ravensworth, Cumbria
- Country: England
- Denomination: Anglican
- Website: St Lawrence, Crosby Ravensworth

History
- Status: Parish church

Architecture
- Functional status: Active
- Heritage designation: Grade I
- Designated: 6 February 1968
- Architects: Robert Smirke or George Gibson; J. S. Crowther
- Architectural type: Church
- Style: Norman, Gothic, Gothic Revival

Specifications
- Materials: Stone, slate roofs

Administration
- Province: York
- Diocese: Carlisle
- Archdeaconry: Carlisle
- Deanery: Appleby
- Parish: Crosby Ravensworth

Clergy
- Priest: Revd Stephen Tudway

St Lawrence's Church is in the village of Crosby Ravensworth, Cumbria, England. It is an active Anglican parish church in the deanery of Appleby, the archdeaconry of Carlisle, and the diocese of Carlisle. Its benefice is united with those of five local churches to form The Leith-Lyvennet Group of Parishes. The church is recorded in the National Heritage List for England as a designated Grade I listed building.

== History ==
The oldest part of the church is to be found at the crossing, and this dates from about 1190–1200. The south doorway and arcades are from the 13th century. It is thought that there was originally a tower at the crossing, but this was dismantled towards the end of the 15th century, and replaced by the west tower, and transepts were also removed. The northeast chapel (the Threlkeld Chapel) does date from this time. The church was remodelled twice during the 19th century. The first took place in 1811–12. This was carried out either by Robert Smirke, or by George Gibson advised by Smirke. Remaining from this remodelling are the south porch and the south doorway of the chancel. The second remodelling took place over a period extending from 1848 to 1887. It was commissioned by the incumbent Revd George F. Weston, and carried out by J. S. Crowther. New furnishings were introduced in 1850, and the whitewash was removed. In 1854 the chancel arch was installed, and a vestry was added. An additional stage was added to the tower in 1866–68, and in 1868 the clerestory was built. The former south transept was rebuilt in 1870–71, followed by the north transept in 1872–73. Finally the chancel was rebuilt, this being completed in 1886.

== Architecture ==
=== Exterior ===
The church is constructed in stone with slate roofs. Its plan consists of a four-bay nave with north and south aisles, a clerestory, and a south porch, north and south transepts, a three-bay chancel with a south porch, and a west tower. The tower has three stages with a battlemented parapet. The windows in the aisles and chancel are in Decorated style, and the windows in the clerestory are small and round. In the gable end of the south transept are two lancet windows, above which is a rose window. Dormers have been inserted into both transepts to improve the internal lighting. Both porches are ornately decorated.

=== Interior ===
Inside the church are arcades with pointed arches in Early English style. Between the chancel and the chapel is an arcaded wooden screen. The chapel is floored with Minton encaustic tiles. The carved wooden reredos depicts the Last Supper. The stone pulpit dates from about 1850, and is elaborately carved. Dating from the same period are the much simpler altar, communion rail, and choir stalls. The font consists of a plain octagonal bowl dated 1662. Its cover has been removed from another font dating from 1818, which stands in the northwest corner of the church. The stained glass in most of the windows was made by Clayton and Bell, with other windows by Shrigley and Hunt, and the west window by William Warrington. In the chapel are monuments, the oldest of which dates from the 16th century or later, and another from 1835 to George Gibson. The two-manual pipe organ was built in 1852–53 by Wilkinson, and rebuilt by the same business in 1903. There is a ring of three bells, all cast in 1823 by Thomas Mears II of the Whitechapel Bell Foundry, but these are no longer ringable.

== External features ==
In the churchyard is a memorial to the family of George Gibson bearing dates including 1779 and 1811. It consists of a stone crocketed pinnacle on a square stone plinth, with cast iron urns on the corners. This is surrounded by railings 3 feet (0.9 m) high. The whole memorial stands 5 feet (1.5 m) high, and is listed at Grade II. Also in the churchyard are the remains of a medieval cross consisting of three chamfered stone fragments standing on a socket stone. It is also listed at Grade II, and is a scheduled monument.

== See also ==
- Grade I listed churches in Cumbria
- Grade I listed buildings in Cumbria
- Listed buildings in Crosby Ravensworth
