= Eccle Riggs =

Country house in Cumbria, England

Coordinates: 54.2705°N 3.2114°W

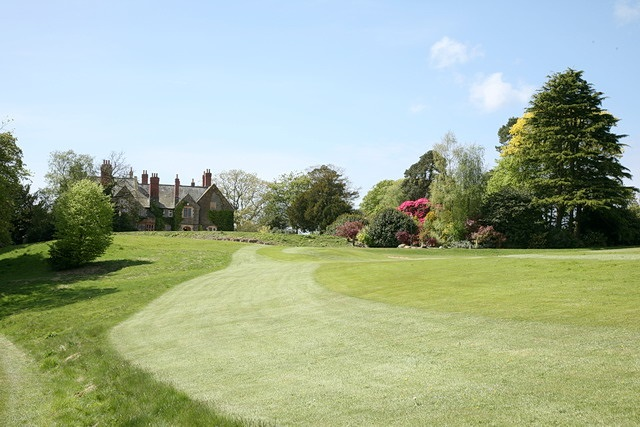
Eccle Riggs

Eccle Riggs is a country house located on Eccle Riggs, a ridge of land about 0.75 miles (1.2 km) to the south of Broughton-in-Furness, Cumbria, England. It was built in 1865 in Tudor style for Richard Assheton Cross, Home Secretary between 1874 and 1880 and 1885 and 1886. The house was designed by the Lancaster architect E. G. Paley. A dining-room wing was added in 1880 by the Manchester architect J. S. Crowther. It has since been used as a leisure club.

== See also ==
- List of works by J. S. Crowther
