= St Thomas' Hospital, Stockport =

Former hospital building in Stockport, England

St Thomas' Hospital
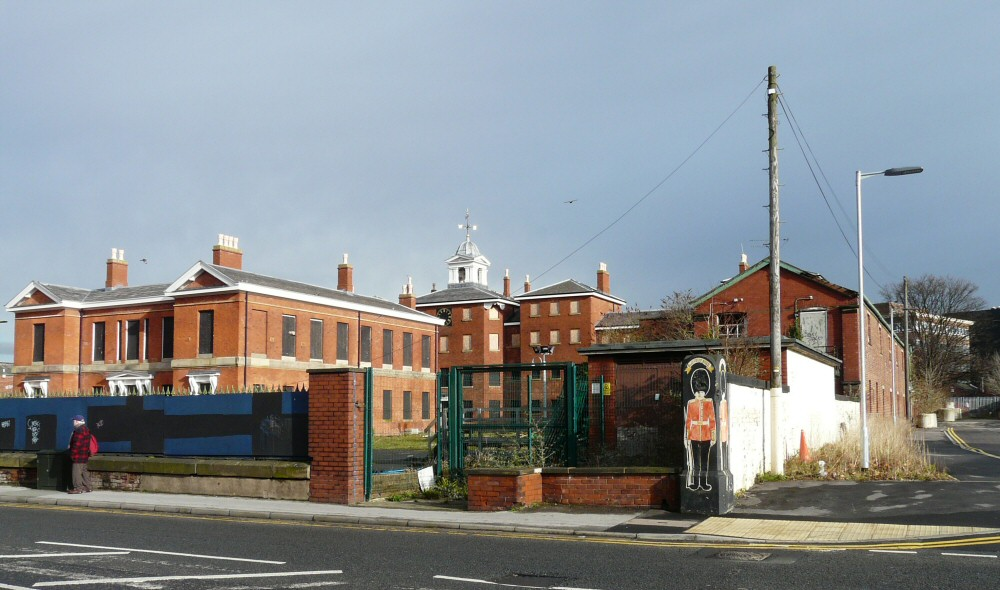
- The building in 2014
- Former names: Stockport Union Workhouse; Shaw Heath Workhouse; Shaw Heath Institution; Shaw Heath Hospital

General information
- Status: Derelict
- Type: Hospital (former)
- Location: Shaw Heath, Cale Green, Stockport, Greater Manchester, England
- Coordinates: 53.40193°N 2.16084°W
- Completed: 1841; 185 years ago
- Closed: 2004; 22 years ago

Technical details
- Floor area: 86,000 sq ft (8,000 m^{2})

Design and construction
- Architect: Henry Bowman

Listed Building – Grade II
- Official name: St Thomas Hospital (original building with the rear wing in the courtyard)
- Designated: 10 March 1975
- Reference no.: 1067161

St Thomas' Hospital, formerly known as the Shaw Heath Hospital, is a derelict former psychiatric hospital and Grade II listed building in Stockport, Greater Manchester, England. Built in 1841 as the Stockport Union Workhouse to designs by Henry Bowman, it later became a psychiatric and geriatric hospital before closing in 2004. The site has since attracted interest from urban explorers and has been the subject of several redevelopment proposals, including a major scheme approved in 2021 to create a multi‑generational community known as St Thomas' Gardens.

== History ==
The building that became St Thomas' Hospital was originally a workhouse known as the Stockport Union Workhouse (though some records list the name as Shaw Heath Workhouse). The building was designed by Henry Bowman and opened on 25 December 1841. It was intended to house 690 inmates.

The workhouse became known as "The Grubber", and in 1894 an investigation by The BMJ reported on several issues with the conditions of working life within the Stockport Union Workhouse and infirmary, detailing overcrowding, disease, poor living conditions and ineffective management.

Between 1948 and 1949, the building was renamed to Shaw Heath Hospital. It became St Thomas' Hospital in 1954. The hospital typically treated psychiatric patients and the elderly. The building became Grade II listed on 10 March 1975.

Stockport Arts and Health, an organisation that was set up in 1993 to promote arts initiatives within the health service in Stockport, moved to a former ward at St Thomas' Hospital in 1998. Later in 1999, the ward was converted and became the Stockport Centre for Arts and Health and operated as a workshop space and exhibition.

The hospital was closed in 2004. Since its closure, St Thomas' Hospital has become a site of interest for urban exploration and paranormal investigators. British paranormal reality television series Most Haunted recorded an episode exploring the hospital building in 2007.

=== Redevelopment ===
There have been several attempts to renovate and repurpose the St Thomas' Hospital site. Plans were announced on the closure of the hospital to repurpose the buildings as a "GP super-centre" and flats for first-time homeowners, but these plans were abandoned after Stockport College acquired the site.

Restoration work to the main building was carried out around 2008. The restoration was planned by architectural firm Austin-Smith:Lord and was part of a £100 million development of the adjoining Stockport College campus, who had acquired the hospital after it had closed in 2004. The work was concluded in 2010 and was intended to be used as staff accommodation, but the building remained vacant after work had completed.

Redevelopment of the site was approved in March 2021 following plans from the Stockport Mayoral Development Corporation which detailed a dementia care and senior living facility called The Academy of Living Well. In 2022 the project (known as St Thomas' Gardens) was provided a formal notice allowing construction work to begin. In November 2024, renovation works commenced to convert the site into a multi-generational community, including affordable homes alongside a care facility.

== Architecture ==
The building has two storeys, built in brick and now covered with render, with simple corner detailing and a slate roof. The ends project slightly and each has an upper sash window above a double door with a small rectangular light over it. The central part has five windows arranged in a narrow‑wide‑narrow pattern, with a stone band marking the floor level. On the ground floor, two plain windows stand either side of a modern entrance with a rectangular light and narrow side panels beneath a shallow pediment. The front stands on a low plinth and is reached by three steps.

At the rear is a courtyard range of several linked blocks in red brick with slate roofs, rising from three to four storeys. The end sections each have three windows, joined by three‑storey links with six windows, some now closed. Beyond these is a taller four‑storey block, then a narrower three‑storey section leading to a canted centre with a 1‑3‑1 window arrangement. Above this is a clock and a small tower with paired pilasters and a lead‑covered top.

== See also ==
- Listed buildings in Stockport
