= King's Meaburn =

Village and civil parish in Cumbria, England

Coordinates: 54.583°N 2.583°W

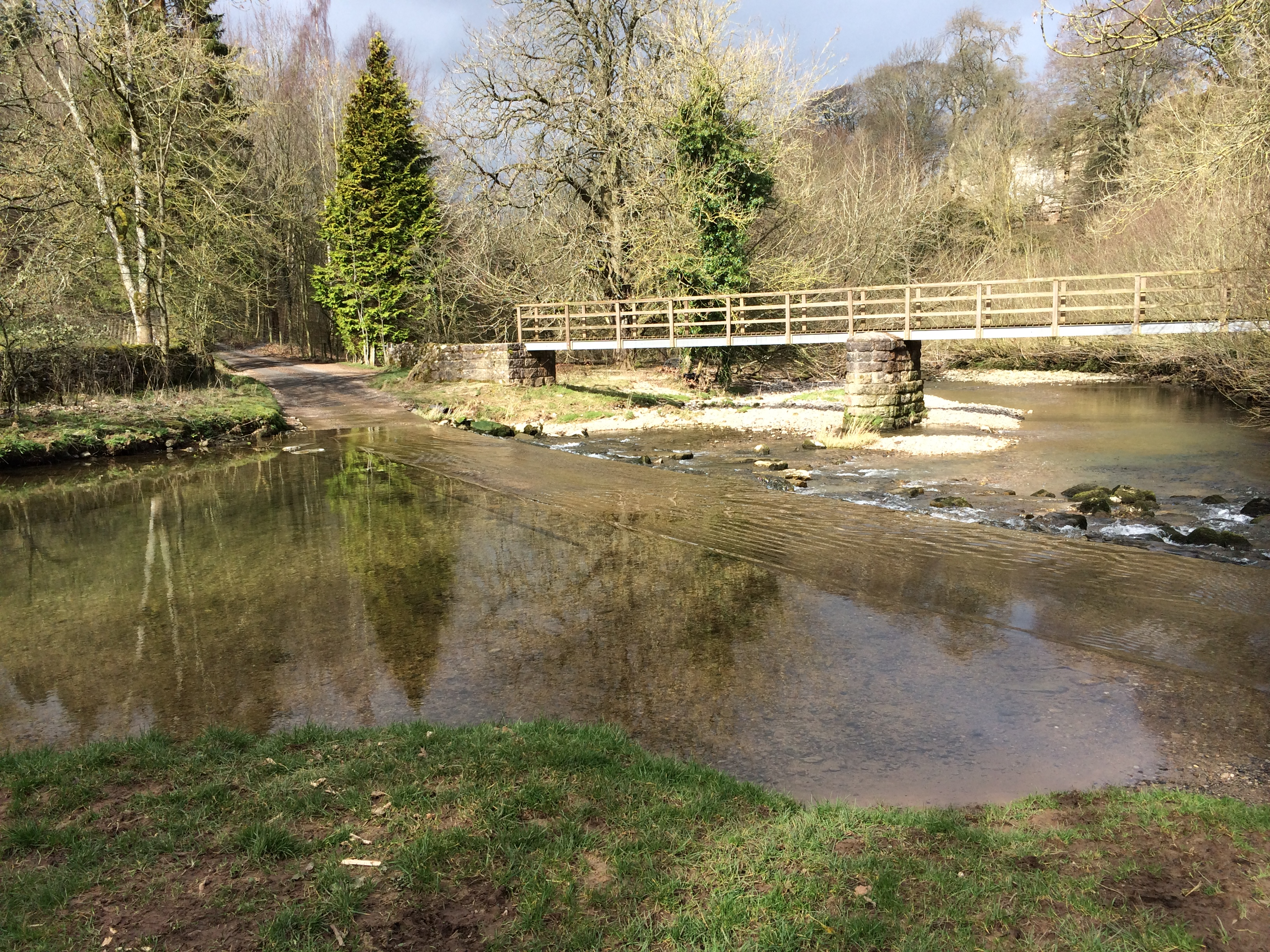
- Ford across the River Lyvennet by the village

- Location within Cumbria
- Population: 135 (2011)
- OS grid reference: NY6221
- Civil parish: King's Meaburn
- Unitary authority: Westmorland and Furness
- Ceremonial county: Cumbria
- Region: North West
- Country: England
- Sovereign state: United Kingdom
- Post town: PENRITH
- Postcode district: CA10
- Dialling code: 01931
- Police: Cumbria
- Fire: Cumbria
- Ambulance: North West
- UK Parliament: Westmorland and Lonsdale

King's Meaburn (English: /ˈmiːbɜːrn/) is a village and civil parish in the Westmorland and Furness district, in the ceremonial county of Cumbria, England. It is located 5 miles (8.0 km) from Appleby-in-Westmorland and 10 miles (16 km) from Penrith, situated in the valley of the River Lyvennet. The river flows just to the west of the village and was crossed by a ford on the road to Newby and Morland. According to the 2001 census, the parish had a population of 105, which increased to 135 according to the 2011 Census.

The village is renowned for hosting an annual Beer Festival at The White Horse.

== History ==
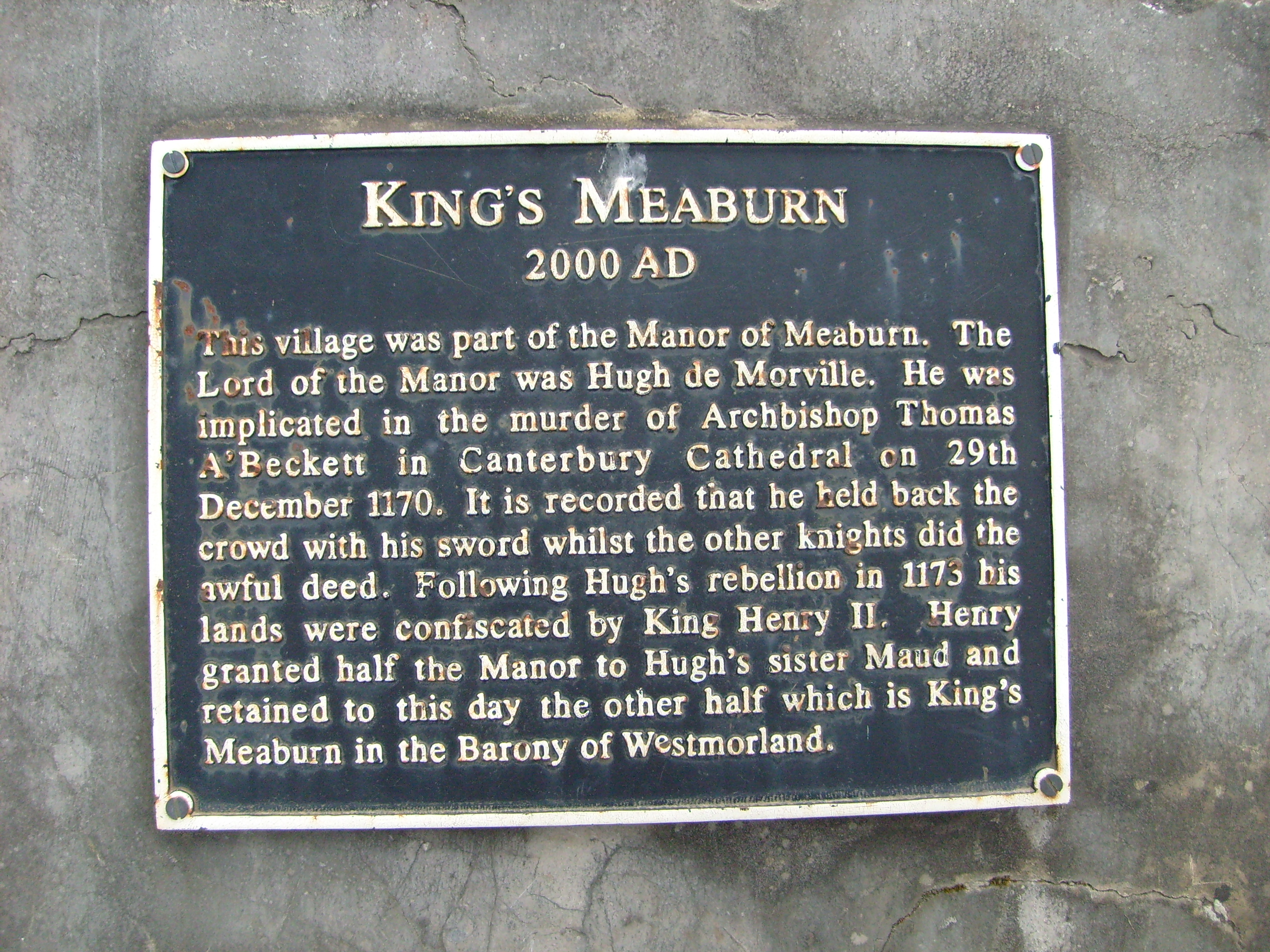
Millennium plaque

King's Meaburn was believed to be an Anglo-Saxon settlement during the 7th and 8th centuries, which is supported by the Anglo-Saxon origin of its name. The name "Meaburn" derives from "Meadburn," signifying a meadow by a stream.

The name King's Meaburn goes back to the 12th century. The King at the time, Henry II, gave part of the village's lands to Sir Hugh de Morville, and the other part to his sister, Maud de Veteripont. Sir Hugh eventually fell out of favour with the King, after which the King reclaimed Sir Hugh's section of the land, and hence the name King's Meaburn. The land that belonged to Maud was and to this day (September 2008) is called Maulds Meaburn.

One notable event in the village was in 1745 when Charles Edward Stuart a.k.a. Bonnie Prince Charlie and some of his soldiers crossed the ford in the village on their way to rendezvous with more of his troops in Shap.

== Geography and weather ==
Due to the village's position relative to the nearby mountains, the village can be subject to strong winds known as the Helm Wind.

== Churches ==
Churches in King's Meaburn include St Mary's, the Wesleyan Chapel and the New Methodist Church.

== Watermill ==
Steele's Mill is now a holiday cottage. It retains a waterwheel, three grinding stones set into a floor, and the original apple-wood cogs and gearing encased in glass.

== Public Services ==
The village has an inn called the White Horse Inn which doubles up as a post office. King's Meaburn used to have a school until it closed down in 1983.

== See also ==
- Listed buildings in King's Meaburn
