= Mill Hill Chapel =

- Mill Hill Unitarian Chapel
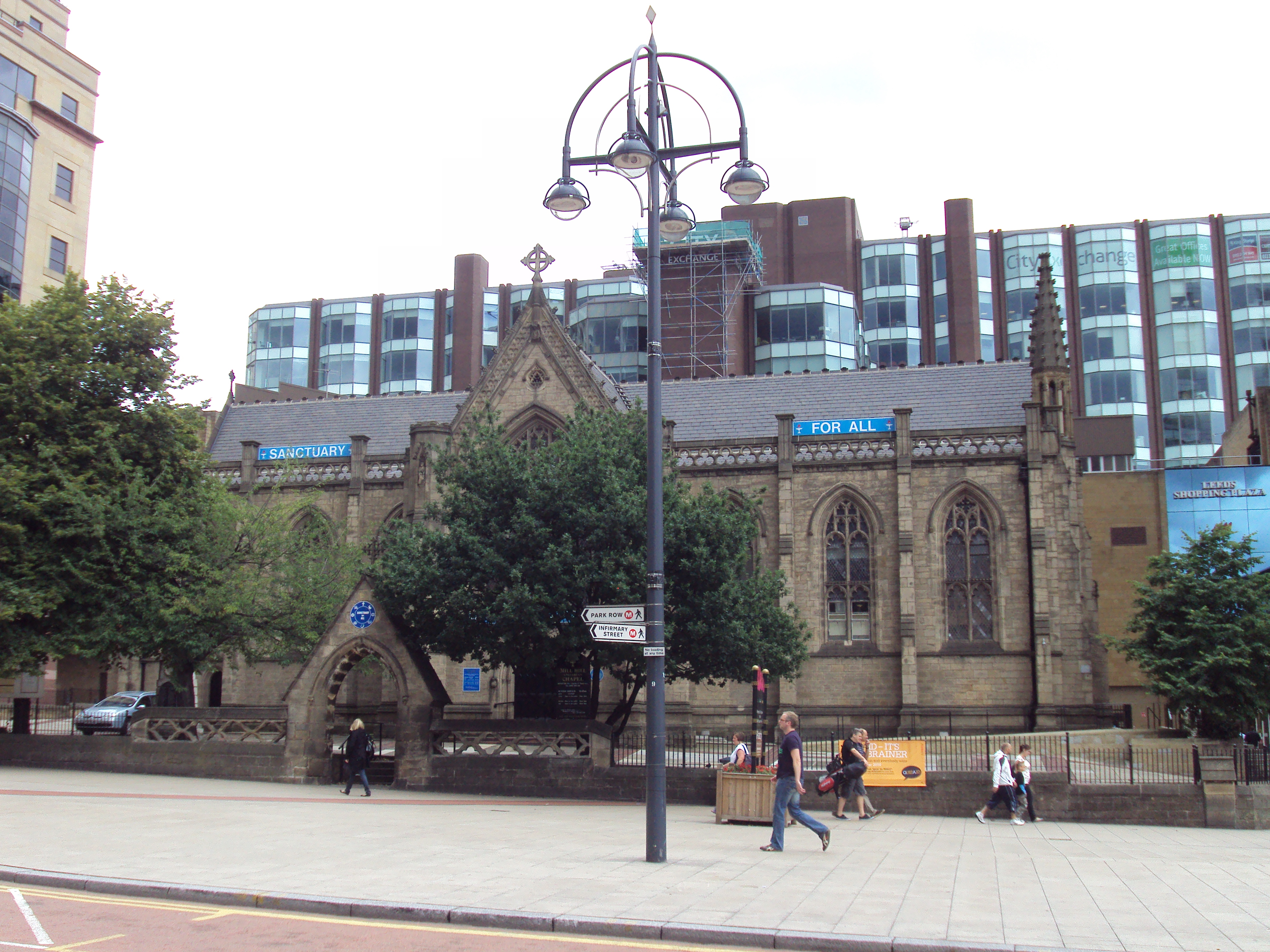

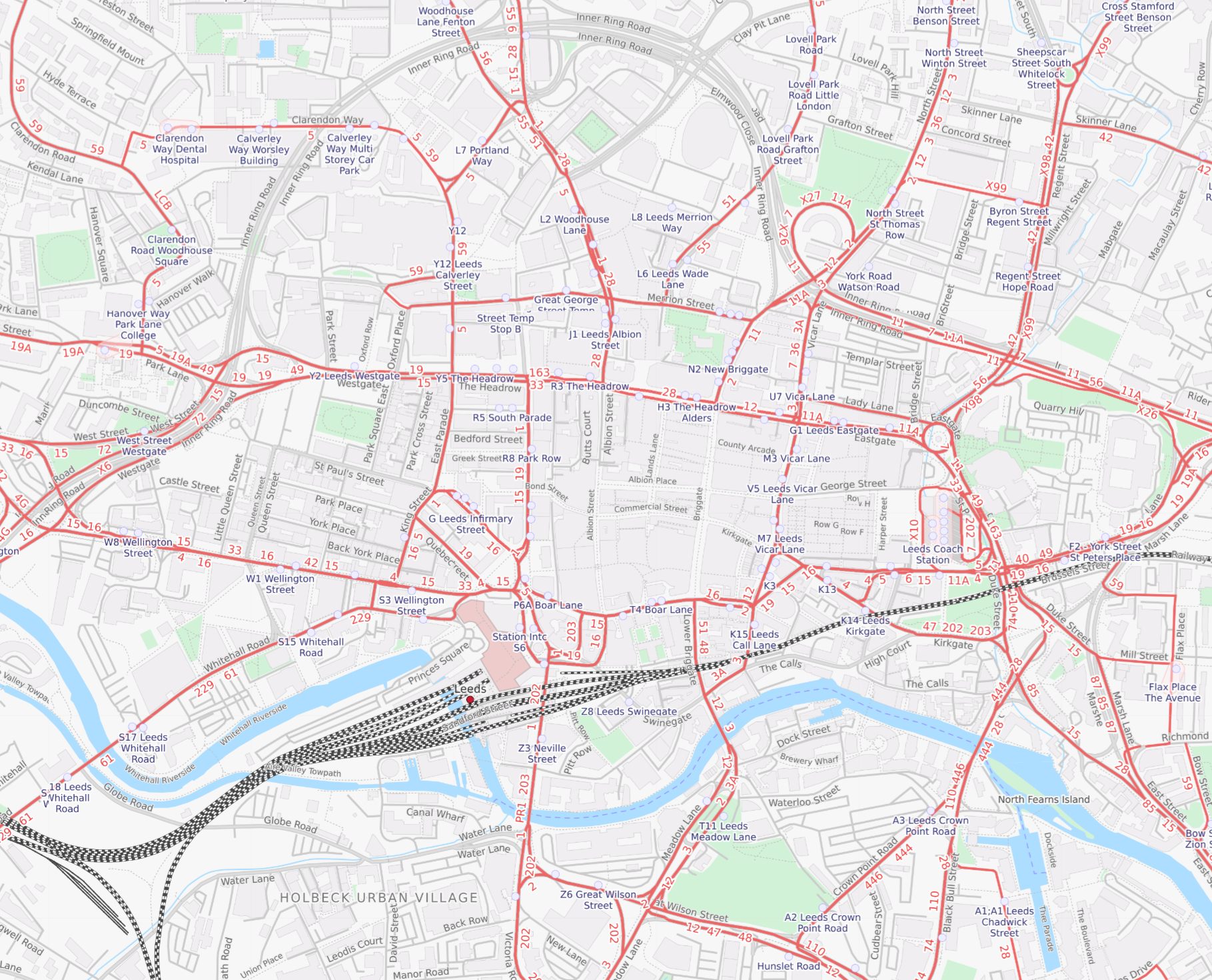
- Location in Leeds
- 53°47′48.15″N 1°32′47.93″W
- OS grid reference: SE 29960 33473
- Location: Leeds City Square, West Yorkshire
- Country: England
- Denomination: Unitarianism
- Previous denomination: Presbyterianism
- Website: millhillchapel.org

Architecture
- Functional status: Active
- Heritage designation: II*
- Designated: 26 September 1963
- Architect(s): Henry Bowman and J. S. Crowther
- Architectural type: Church (building)
- Style: Dissenting Gothic

Specifications
- Capacity: 120

Administration
- District: The Yorkshire Union Of Unitarian And Free Christian Churches

Mill Hill Chapel is a Unitarian church in Leeds, West Yorkshire, England. It is a member of the General Assembly of Unitarian and Free Christian Churches, the umbrella organisation for British Unitarians. The building, which stands in the centre of the city on City Square, was granted Grade II* listed status in 1963.

== History ==
As early as 1674, only a dozen years after the Great Ejection, the Dissenters in Leeds had built a chapel on the main town square. One of the founders was the father of the historian Ralph Thoresby who guided the chapel toward the Dissenter movement which, at Mill Hill Chapel, would become Unitarianism.

=== 18th century ===
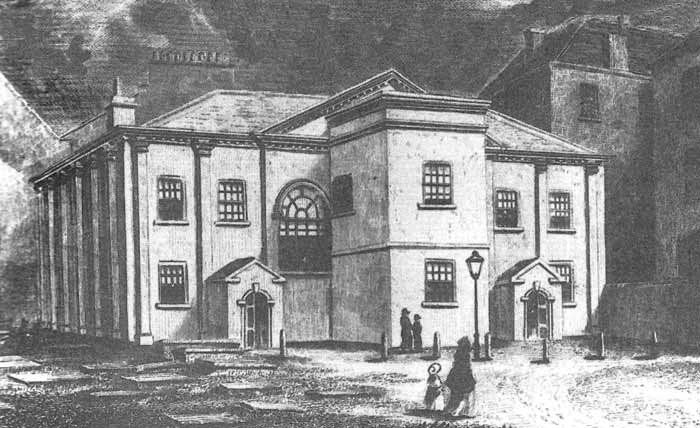
Mill Hill Chapel, Leeds – 18th century

During the late 18th century, Mill Hill's sister chapel was the Independent Congregationalist Call Lane Chapel, Leeds. Many of Leeds's leading families such as George William Oates at Low Hall, Potternewton and the Dixon family of Gledhow Hall were heavily involved with both churches at this time. Some local gentry, such as Hans Busk, even "maintained a private Unitarian chaplain" or "Preaching Room" on their own estates.

From the late 18th century, Mill Hill Chapel continued to "penetrate county society" with prominent politicians, industrialists and merchants such as the Lupton family – who were also committed to the Call Lane Chapel – being its strongest supporters.

=== 19th and early 20th centuries ===
The Kitson family were also deeply involved in the chapel. William Morris designed a window to Ann Kitson, who died in 1865. Her son James Kitson, 1st Baron Airedale, paid for the extension of the vestry in 1897. After James's death, Archibald Keightley Nicholson created a window in his name, representing the continuation of Christianity.

The Leeds Philosophical and Literary Society drew many of its supporters from the chapel. "There was a careful consciousness of middle-class identity and independence...which combined easily with the utilitarian and scientific interests" of the Mill Hill congregation. Mill Hill Chapel became known punningly as "the mayors' nest", as so many mayors and later lord mayors belonged to it. There are memorials to, for example, Francis Garbutt (1847) and John Darnton Luccock (1864).

The church guidebook describes the early twentieth century as "a small but politically active and very influential congregation led by the Revd Charles Hargrove and Sir James Kitson". A notable member of the congregation prior to the First World War was Jogendra Nath Sen, who came to study Electrical Engineering at the University of Leeds. He volunteered to fight in September 1914 and joined the Leeds Pals.

=== 21st century ===
A plaque outside the church observes that the chapel was the first place of worship in Leeds city centre to conduct a same-sex wedding.

== Architecture ==
Mill Hill Chapel sits on the east side of Leeds City Square, in the centre of one of England's most populous, and at the time of its construction most prosperous, cities. Its architects Henry Bowman and J. S. Crowther designed it in 1848 in the Dissenting Gothic style. The nave still has the original Victorian pews. The architectural sculpture was executed by Robert Mawer.

Leeds Civic Trust recognised its importance in the city with a Blue Plaque.

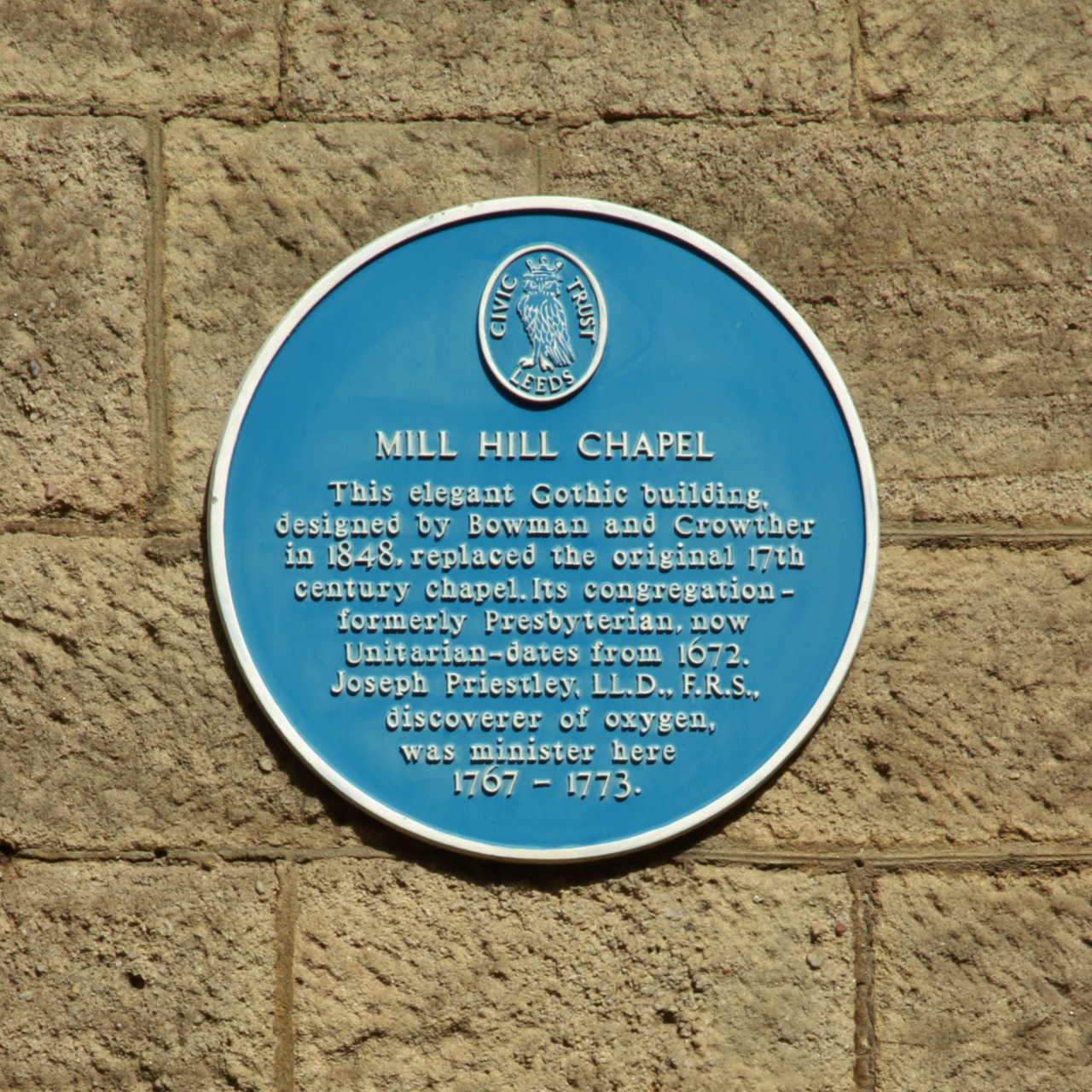
Leeds' Mill Hill Chapel Blue Plaque

== Ministers ==
Minister Richard Stretton MA (oxon) began his ministry at Mill Hill in 1672. In 1694 Timothy Manlove, who practised as a physician, was invited to be the minister.

The chapel belonged to the tradition of English Dissent and the congregation maintained links with English Presbyterianism until the beginning of the eighteenth century, "but it took a dramatic turn in the direction of heterodoxy with the appointment of Thomas Walker (died 1763) in 1748". He was the uncle-guardian of George Walker, mathematician and activist, who merited inclusion in the Dictionary of National Biography. Joseph Priestley considered Thomas Walker heretical. Many of Walker's sermons were recorded by Joseph Ryder (1695–1768), whose extensive diaries (of 5,000 sermons across Yorkshire) were inherited by his relative Olive Lupton, née Rider (1753–1803).

Joseph Priestley was its minister from 1767 to 1773, and guided the chapel towards Unitarianism. Priestley recommended as his successor William Wood, who was involved in efforts to remedy the political and educational disabilities of Nonconformists under the Test Acts. In addition, during his years there until his death in 1808, he developed considerable expertise as a botanist. His son George William Wood was born there.

Rev Charles Wicksteed was minister for a generation, from 1835 to 1854, and wrote a history of the chapel after he retired. During his time in Leeds, he was president of the Phil and Lit learned society, or, to give it its formal title, the Leeds Philosophical and Literary Society, from 1851 to 1854. He co-founded the Leeds Education Society, a precursor to the National Education League. The minister was influential nationally too, jointly editing the Prospective Review for ten years, "the influential voice of the ‘new school’ of English Unitarianism, as against the older tradition of eighteenth-century Priestleyanism" and shaping "the adoption of neo-Gothic architecture" in the new chapels that were being built - what is now called Dissenting Gothic.

From 1855 the minister was Thomas Hincks, a naturalist known for his work on zoophytes and bryozoa. He lost his voice and had to resign in 1869. He devoted his retirement to his scientific work and in 1872 was elected a Fellow of the Royal Society.

== See also ==
- Grade II* listed buildings in Leeds
- Listed buildings in Leeds (City and Hunslet Ward - northern area)
