= Jogendra Nath Sen =

Indian soldier

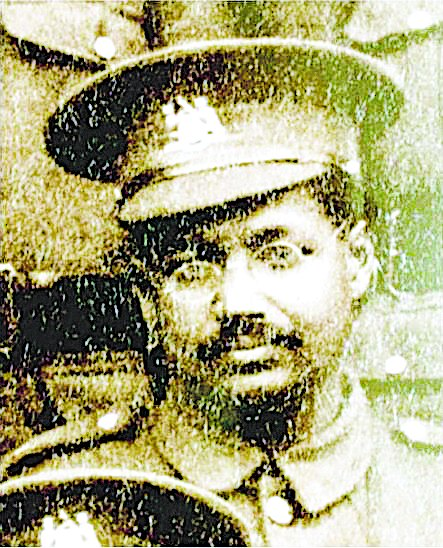
- Jogendra Nath Sen
- Born: 1887; Chandannagar, French India
- Died: 22 May 1916 (aged 29); Somme, France
- Military career
- Allegiance: United Kingdom
- Branch: British Army
- Service years: 1914-1916
- Rank: Private
- Nickname: Jon or John
- Conflicts: First World War

Jogendra Nath Sen (Bengali: যোগেন্দ্রনাথ সেন) (1887 – 22 May 1916) was an Indian private soldier in the British Army who fought in the First World War. He is believed to be the first Bengali soldier to have died in the First World War.

== Early life ==
Sen was born in Chandernagore, a French colony in Bengal. His mother was a widow and his elder brother was a doctor. Sen travelled to England in 1910. He took admission in the University of Leeds. During his studies he took up a job in Leeds Corporation Electric Lighting station in Whitehall Road. Sen completed his B.Sc. in electrical engineering in 1913. He could speak seven languages.

== Military career ==
After completing his studies, Sen was staying in Grosvenor Place in Blackman Lane in Leeds. In September, 1914, he enlisted in the 15th Battalion of the West Yorkshire Regiment also known as the Leeds Pals Battalion. Sen was the only non-white in the 15th West Yorkshire Regiment. Despite this, Sen was very much respected by his peers in the army, being known as Jon Sen or John Sen.

== Death ==
On the night of 22 May, Sen was in action as the member of a wiring party that was heavily bombarded. Sen was hit in the leg by a shrapnel. When he was being dressed up, he was hit again in the neck and he died instantly. He was buried at the Sucrerie Military Cemetery in Colincamps in Somme, France. His personal items were sent to his brother in India who later donated them to the Institut de Chandernagore in Chandannagar.

== See also ==
- Indra Lal Roy
