= Henry Bowman (architect) =

English church architect and architectural historian (1814–1883)

Henry Bowman (1814–1883) was an English church architect and architectural historian.

== Life ==
Henry Bowman was born in Nantwich, Cheshire, in 1814, the second son of John Eddowes Bowman the Elder. Bowman worked as an architect in Manchester, from 1840 to about 1883, in partnership with Joseph Stretch Crowther. He designed Congleton Workhouse in 1838 and Stockport Union Workhouse in 1840.

He was elected to membership of the Manchester Literary and Philosophical Society on 29 October 1839

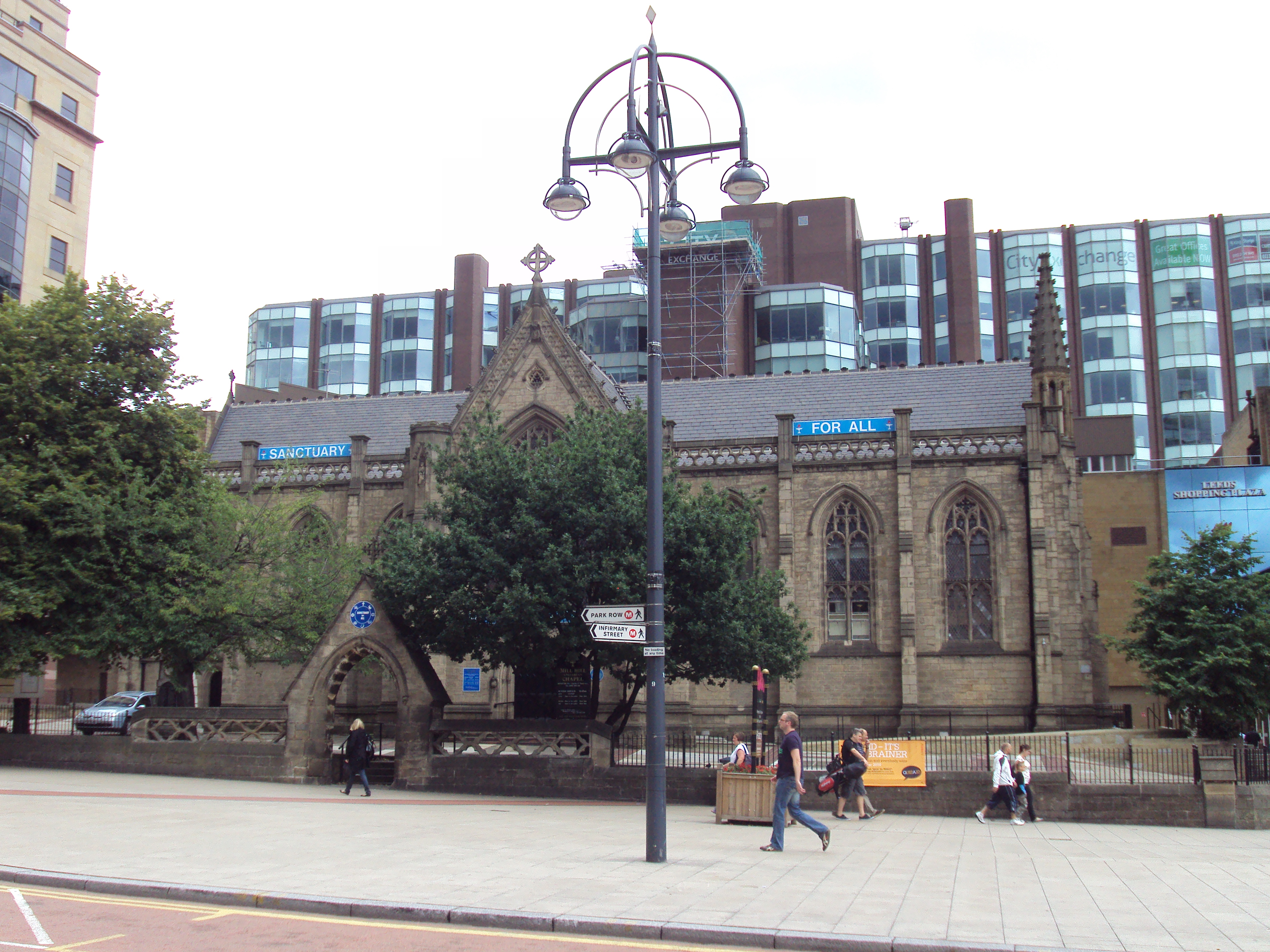
Mill Hill Unitarian Chapel, Leeds City Square, by Bowman & Crowther, opened 27 December 1847.

Bowman died at Brockham Green, near Reigate, on 14 May 1883. The brass lectern at Christchurch, Brockham is dedicated to his memory.

== Works ==
Among the churches Bowman designed are Hyde Chapel, Cheshire and Mill Hill Chapel, Leeds. He was joint author with James Hadfield of Ecclesiastical Architecture of Great Britain, from the Conquest to the Reformation, 1845; and with his partner, J. S. Crowther, of The Churches of the Middle Ages, 1857. Bowman and Crowther trained a number of younger architects, including Thomas Worthington, John Garrard Elgood, and possibly Edward Salomons.
