= Maulds Meaburn =

Village in Cumbria, England

Coordinates: 54.53861°N 2.57842°W

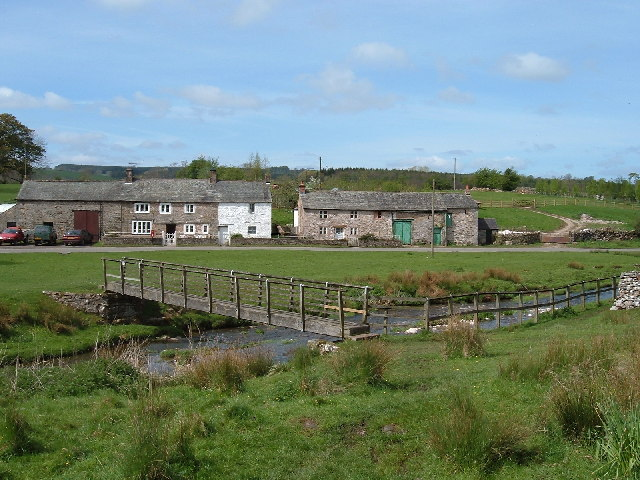
- Maulds Meaburn village houses

- Location in Eden, Cumbria Location within Cumbria
- OS grid reference: NY626160
- Civil parish: Crosby Ravensworth
- Unitary authority: Westmorland and Furness
- Ceremonial county: Cumbria
- Region: North West
- Country: England
- Sovereign state: United Kingdom
- Post town: PENRITH
- Postcode district: CA10
- Dialling code: 01931
- Police: Cumbria
- Fire: Cumbria
- Ambulance: North West
- UK Parliament: Westmorland and Lonsdale

Maulds Meaburn (English: /ˈmɔːrldz ˈmiːbɜːrn/) is a village in Cumbria, England. It is located in the Lyvennet Valley and Yorkshire Dales National Park and is 13 miles from Penrith. Its origins are connected with the nearby village King's Meaburn.

Lankaber is a group of farms which is part of Maulds Meaburn. It is not a hamlet in its own right.

== History ==
The name Maulds Meaburn goes back to the 12th century. The King at the time, Henry II, gave part of the lands of Meaburn to Sir Hugh de Morville, and the other part to his sister, Maud de Veteripont. Sir Hugh eventually fell out of favour with the King, after which the King reclaimed Sir Hugh's section of the land, and this area from here on became known as Kings Meaburn. The land that belonged to Maud remains known as called Maulds Meaburn.

The village changed hands over the years and after it was owned by the Veteriponts it passed to the families of Frauncey and then Vernon.

Flass House, on the south side of the village, is a picturesque mansion, built 1851–3 in Italianate style. It was the home of Lancelot Dent who was involved in the opium trade. In 2015, the current owner of Flass House was convicted, along with several other men, of drug offences, where Flass House was used as a 'cannabis farm'.

== Geography ==
The village is situated on either side of the Lyvennet Beck. Maulds Meaburn is part of the Crosby Ravensworth Parish.

== See also ==
- Listed buildings in Crosby Ravensworth
