= River Lyvennet =

River in Cumbria, England

Coordinates: 54.6283°N 2.6078°W

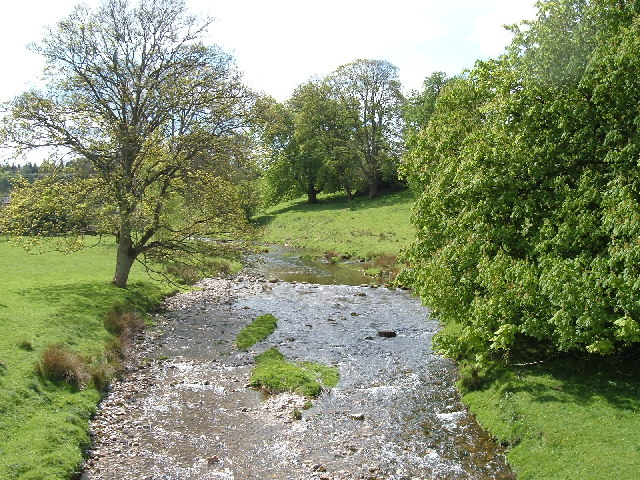
The Lyvennet near Maulds Meaburn

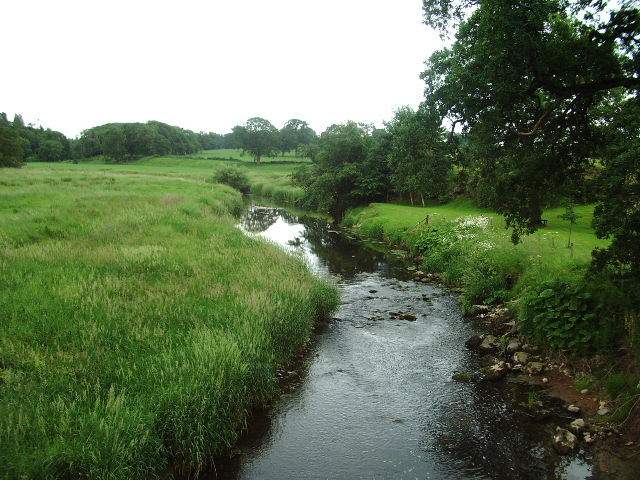
The Lyvennet between the confluence of the rivers Leith and Lyvennet and Cliburn Mill Bridge

The River Lyvennet is a river flowing through the county of Cumbria in England.

The source of the Lyvennet (as Lyvennet Beck) is close to Robin Hood's Grave on Crosby Ravensworth Moor, an area rich in ancient remains. From there, the beck flows northwards through Crosby Ravensworth, Maulds Meaburn and King's Meaburn, emerging as the River Lyvennet. The river is joined by the River Leith shortly before the Lyvennet's own confluence with the River Eden. It is 17.326 kilometres (10.766 mi) long and has a catchment area of 52.094 square kilometres (20.114 sq mi).

The Environment Agency, Natural England and the Eden Rivers Trust have partnered to, over the course of two years, restore bends and turns to parts of the river that had previously been straightened for land management purposes. This can help prevent flooding and has encouraged Atlantic salmon to return to spawn. Volunteers planted 10,000 wildflowers of over 30 native species on the surrounding land.

The river is also home to brown trout.

Several Pedigree cattle herds are named after the river, including Lyvennet Simmentals of Greystone House, King's Meaburn.

The Lyvennet valley may preserve the name of Taliesin's "Llwyfenydd" and would thus be associated with the post-Roman Brythonic kingdom of Rheged. The meaning of the Welsh word "llwyfen" is the elm tree.
