= Crosby Ravensworth =

Village and civil parish in Cumbria, England

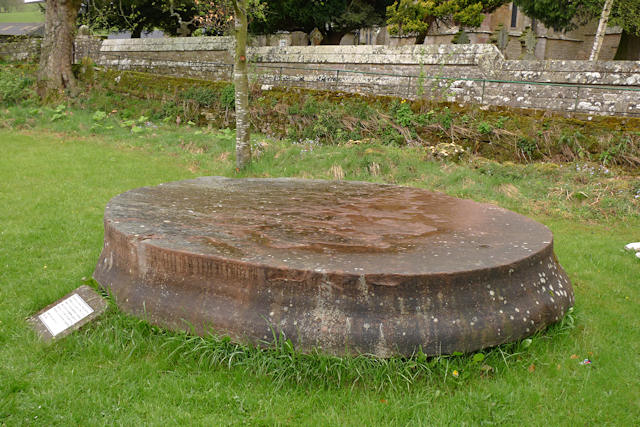
- Millennium Sandstone Pillar

- Location within Cumbria
- Population: 517 (2011)
- OS grid reference: NY6214
- Civil parish: Crosby Ravensworth
- Unitary authority: Westmorland and Furness
- Ceremonial county: Cumbria
- Region: North West
- Country: England
- Sovereign state: United Kingdom
- Post town: PENRITH
- Postcode district: CA10
- Dialling code: 01931
- Police: Cumbria
- Fire: Cumbria
- Ambulance: North West
- UK Parliament: Westmorland and Lonsdale

Crosby Ravensworth is a village and civil parish in the Westmorland and Furness district of Cumbria, England. The village is about 4 miles (6.4 km) east of the M6 motorway, and Shap. At the 2001 census the parish had a population of 538, decreasing to 517 at the 2011 Census.

== History ==
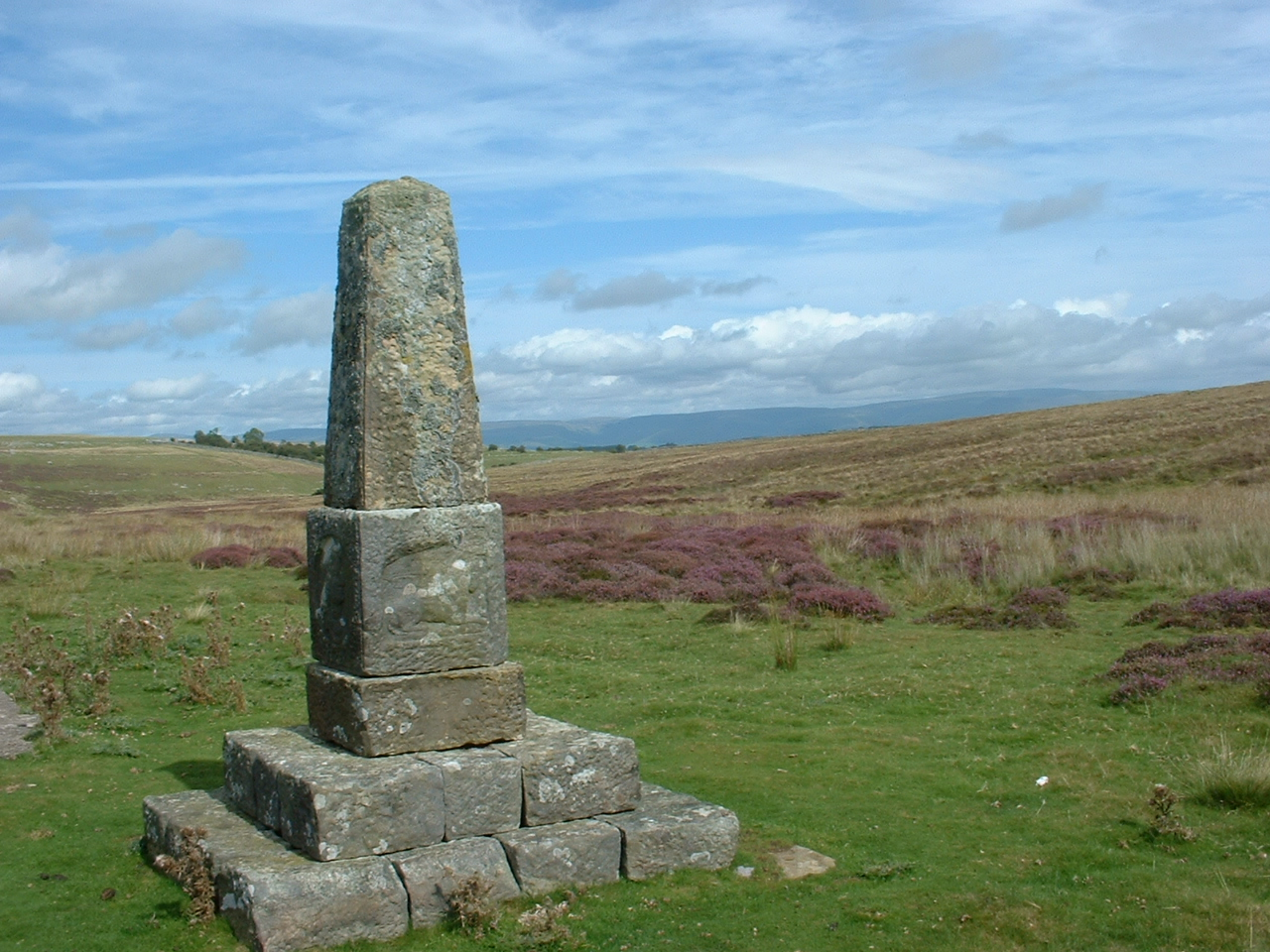
Charles II Monument

Prehistoric remains include the White Hag stone circle (54.497294°N 2.608298°W). A pair of almost identical La Tène Celtic spoons dating from the Iron Age were found in Crosby Ravensworth in the nineteenth century and are now housed in the British Museum in London. The remains of a moat surround Crosby Hall, a farm in the village. A more recent monument at Black Dub commemorates the visit of Charles II of England in 1651. The fell also contains one of several sites in England called Robin Hood's Grave.

== Crosby Ravensworth Fell ==
Crosby Ravensworth Fell is the source of the River Lyvennet and is crossed by the Coast to Coast Walk. It features a considerable expanse of limestone pavement.

== Notable people ==
- John Langhorne, mathematical master at Giggleswick School
- Reverend John Langhorne, Master of Tonbridge School, Headmaster of The King's School, Rochester and vicar of Lamberhurst
- Reverend Thomas Langhorne, Founder of Loretto School
- Reverend Lancelot Addison (1632 – 20 April 1703) – A famed English scholar. Dean of Lichfield

== Governance ==
An electoral ward in the same name exists. This ward stretches from Bolton south to Great Asby with a total population taken at the 2011 census of 1,396.

== See also ==
- Listed buildings in Crosby Ravensworth
