= Courtenay Boyle (civil servant) =

English cricketer and civil servant

Personal information
- Full name: Courtenay Edmund Boyle
- Born: 21 October 1845; Newcastle, Jamaica
- Died: 18 May 1901 (aged 55); Marylebone, London, England
- Batting: Right-handed
- Role: Wicket-keeper
- Relatives: Cecil Boyle (cousin); Charlton Lane (brother-in-law)

Domestic team information
- Years: Team
- 1865–1867: Oxford University
- 1866–1872: Marylebone Cricket Club

Career statistics
Competition	First-class
Matches	24
Runs scored	575
Batting average	14.02
100s/50s	–/3
Top score	55
Catches/stumpings	21/6
- Source: Cricinfo, 2 February 2020

Sir Courtenay Edmund Boyle KCB (21 October 1845 – 18 May 1901) was an English first-class cricketer and civil servant.

The son of Captain Cavendish Spencer Boyle and Rose Susan Alexander and the grandson of the Royal Navy admiral of the same name, he was born in October 1845 at the British military outpost at Newcastle in the Colony of Jamaica. He was educated at Charterhouse School, before going up to Christ Church, Oxford. Boyle debuted in first-class cricket for Southgate against Oxford University at Oxford on 9 June 1865. Two weeks later he played his first first-class match for Oxford against the Marylebone Cricket Club (MCC). He played first-class cricket for Oxford until 1867, making fourteen appearances in which he scored 367 runs at an average of 15.95, with a high score of 55. He also made an additional eight first-class appearances for the MCC from 1866 to 1872, as well as making a further appearance for Southgate in 1868. He played tennis for Oxford against Cambridge, defeating the Cambridge player in 1866 and 1867.

Boyle graduated from Oxford with a second class in moderations and a third class in Literae humaniores. Soon after leaving Oxford, he was employed by Lord Spencer, to whom he was related, as his firstly his assistant private secretary and then as his private secretary at Dublin Castle during his first tenure as Lord Lieutenant of Ireland. He was employed as an inspector for the English local government board in 1873, before being appointed as an inspector for the Eastern Counties in 1876. Upon Lord Spencer's second term as Lord Lieutenant, he resumed his employment as his private secretary. He was one of the first people to arrive on the scene of the Phoenix Park Murders in May 1882. Boyle was appointed to the Order of the Bath in the 1885 Birthday Honours.

He was appointed by A. J. Mundella, the then President of the Board of Trade, to be the assistant secretary in charge of the railway department in 1886. While in the post he oversaw the investigation into railway rates and tolls, which was pivotal to the passing of the Railway and Canal Traffic Act 1888 (51 & 52 Vict. c. 25) and the Regulation of Railways Act 1889. He also played an important role in the later establishment of the National Physical Laboratory. He was made a Knight Commander of the Order of the Bath in the 1892 Birthday Honours and the following year he was appointed as permanent secretary to the Board of Trade. At the beginning of 1900 Boyle started a controversy in the columns of The Times by arguing that January 1 had seen in a new century. Most correspondents didn't agree, one arguing that if the civil servant in charge of ordering artillery for the South African War didn't know the difference between 99 and a 100 that it was no surprise that the troops faced problems of quality and supply. Boyle wrote in The Times under the pseudonym 'An Old Blue', in which he received widespread attention for advocating cricket reform. Boyle died from heart failure following a short illness at his Granville Place residence in May 1901.

Relations included his wife, Muriel Sarah Campbell, the daughter of John Campbell, 2nd Earl Cawdor, who he married in April 1876 and had no children with. His brother, Cavendish, was the colonial administrator who served as Colonial Governor of Newfoundland, Mauritius and British Guiana. Their grandfather was the naval officer and political Sir Courtenay Boyle. His cousin, Cecil Boyle, was a rugby union international and a first-class cricketer.
