= Hibbert House =

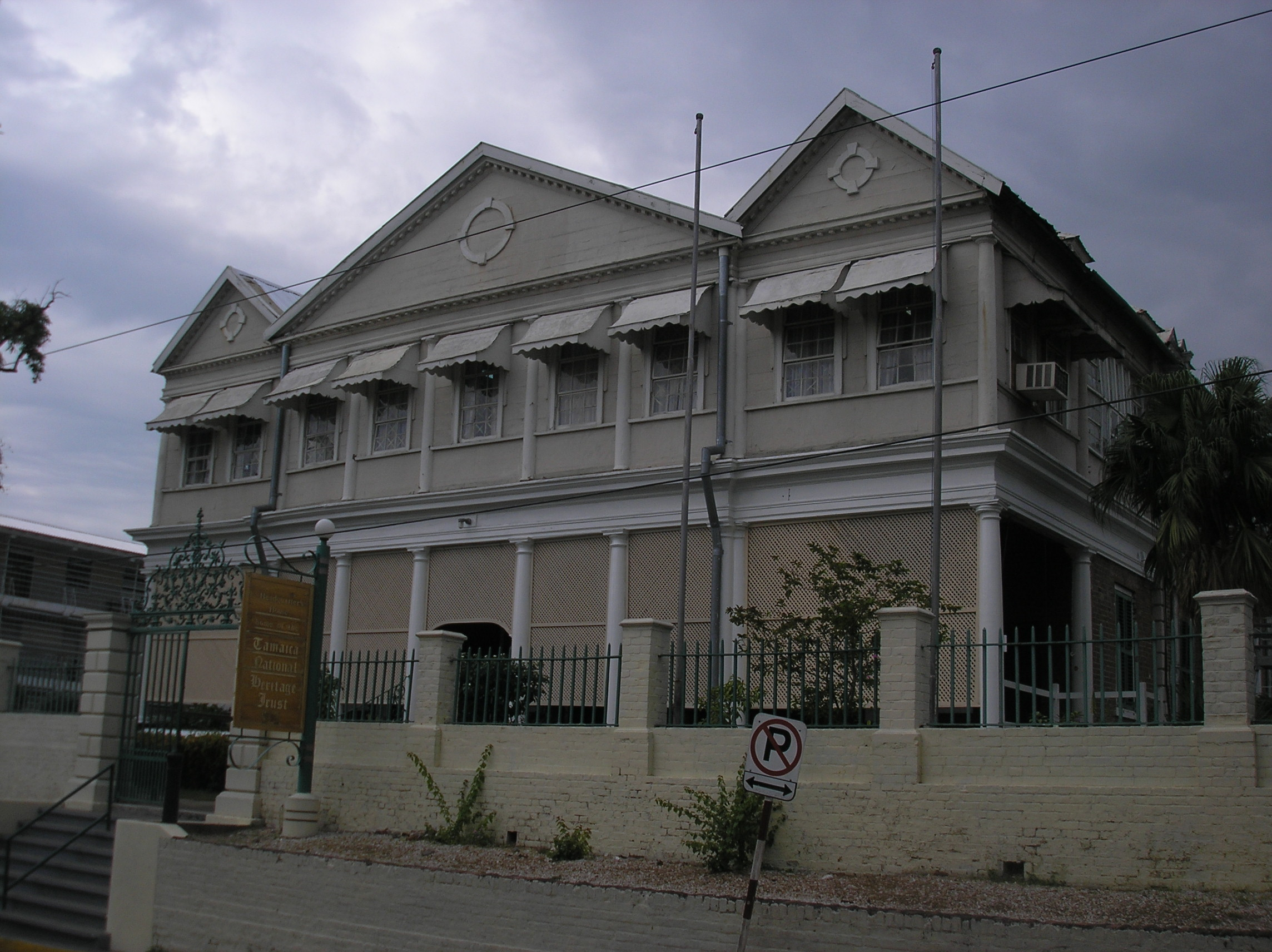
- Hibbert House, 79 Duke Street, Kingston, Jamaica.
- Interactive map of the Hibbert House area
- Former names: Headquarters House

General information
- Location: 79 Duke Street, Kingston, Jamaica
- Coordinates: 17.973646°N 76.790727°W
- Construction started: 1755
- Completed: 1755
- Owner: Jamaica National Heritage Trust

Hibbert House, also known as Headquarters House, is the head office of the Jamaica National Heritage Trust. It is located at 79 Duke Street in Kingston, Jamaica. It was built in 1755 by Thomas Hibbert, a wealthy English merchant, to serve as his residence. Hibbert migrated to Kingston in 1734, at a time when Jamaica was becoming the wealthiest of the British Caribbean islands and the largest single destination of African slaves. In the early 1750s, he formed a partnership with Nathaniel Sprigg to serve as factors for slaves, purchasing them off the ships from Africa and reselling them to planters and others in Jamaica. Hibbert also helped found a major West Indian house in London, trading in sugar and rum.

== The building ==
The two-story house is made from fine Flemish bond brickwork, stone and timber. The walls are brick with limestone quoins. The front of the building has Jamaican Vernacular fretwork.

The house has a basement and an attic with dormer windows, a courtyard and several outhouses. Offices were on the ground floor with bedrooms above.

== Early days ==
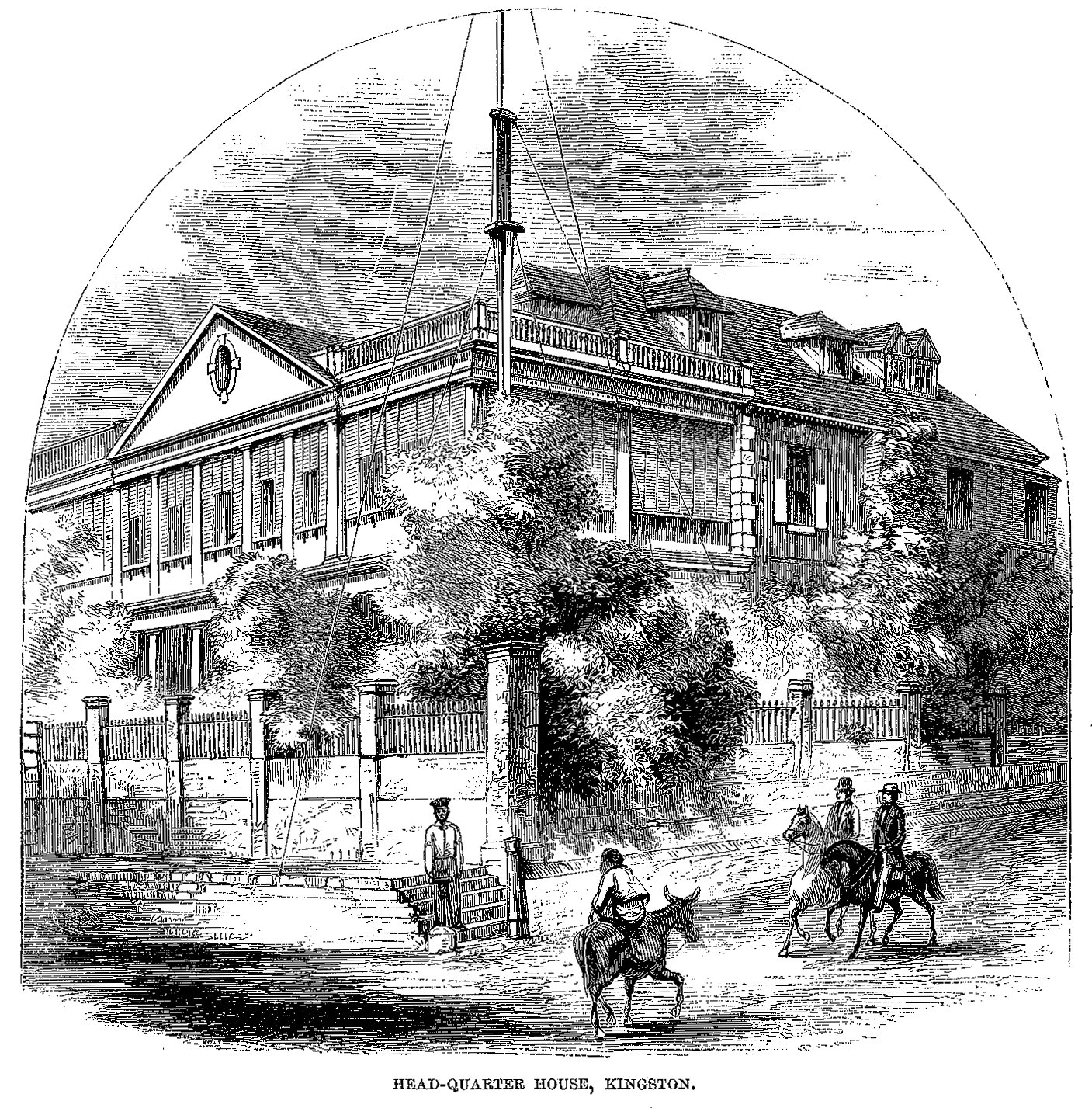
"Head-Quarter House, Kingston", illustration of article "Cast-away in Jamaica" by W.E. Sewell, in Harper's Magazine, January 1861.

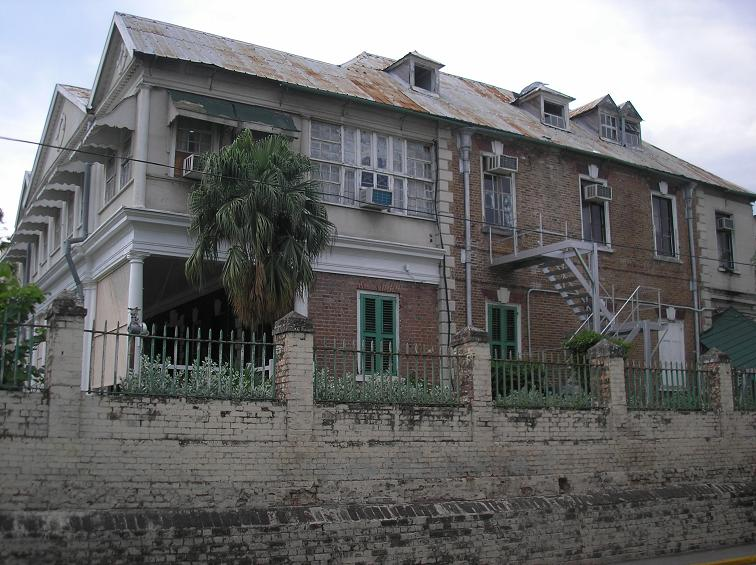
Hibbert House

Headquarters House or "Hibbert House", as it was known up to the time of the owner's death, stands as a reminder of the wealth and power of the Kingston merchants in their glory days. Hibbert was among the first of many wealthy merchants to build in the Georgian style of architecture, as was fashionable in 18th century England. This style would play a large part in the development of Jamaican architecture.

Hibbert became involved in politics and in due course was named Speaker of the House of Assembly in 1756. When the capital of Jamaica temporarily moved from Spanish Town to Kingston in 1754. the House of Assembly and Legislative Council held their meetings at Hibbert House until 1758.

Hibbert never married, but he maintained a 24-year relationship with Charity Harry, dating from the birth of their daughter Jane Harry in 1756. Charity Harry was described as Hibbert's housekeeper and a "free mulatto," meaning she was not enslaved and had mixed European and African ancestry. She could read and own property. Hibbert provided her with a home, clothes, furniture, and other possessions. Upon Hibbert's death the house was passed to his heir and nephew and not to his daughter Jane or long time consort Charity.

== Military Headquarters ==
In 1814 the house was sold to the War Office of the West Indies Regiment to serve as its headquarters, and as the residence for the General of the army that was garrisoned there. This is where it gained the name of "Headquarters House". Since the house is located near the harbor with a good view of the city, it was very desirable as a military headquarters. It was during this time that the crow's nest/ sentinel post was built on the roof.

While Hibbert House served as the Headquarters House, several illustrious commanders resided there:

- Willoughby Cotton, who ordered the militia to crush the Christmas Rebellion of enslaved Africans, led by Sam Sharpe in 1831.
- William Gomm who founded the Military Hill Station at New Castle, St. Andrew in 1841.
- Luke O'Connor, Commander in Chief of the Military Forces which put down the Morant Bay rebellion of 1865.
- Mayor John Eyre, organized his attack on St. Thomas to crush the Morant Bay Rebellion.

== Purchase by Jamaican government ==
Hibbert House was purchased by the Jamaican government in 1872 for £5000 Sterling. Kingston became the permanent seat of the Jamaica legislation and Hibbert House was used as the Offices of Colonial Secretary until 1960.

== Current use ==
Since 1983, Headquarters House has been used as the head office of the Jamaica National Heritage Trust.

== See also ==
- List of National Heritage Sites in Jamaica

== Bibliography ==
- Jennings, Judi. Gender, Religion, and Radicalism in the Long Eighteenth Century: An 'Ingenious Quaker' and Her Connections (ashgate, 2006).
