= 1885 Birthday Honours =

National awards given by Queen Victoria

The Queen's Birthday Honours 1885 are the birthday honours announced in 1885 in celebration of the birthday of Queen Victoria.

== The Most Honourable Order of the Bath ==
Appointments to the Order of the Bath were published in The London Gazette on 15 June 1885.

=== Knight Grand Cross of the Order of the Bath (GCB) ===
Civil Division

- Sir John Savile Lumley KCB, Ambassador Extraordinary and Minister Plenipotentiary at Rome.

=== Knight Commander of the Order of the Bath (KCB) ===
Civil Division

- Nathaniel Barnaby CB, Director of Naval Construction.

=== Companion of the Order of the Bath (CB) ===
Civil Division

- The Right Honourable Marquess of Hamilton
- Hugh Owen, Permanent Secretary to the Local Government Board.
- Colonel Richard Hugh Stotherd, Royal Engineers, Director of the Survey Department.
- Lieutenant-Colonel Robert Owen Jones, Head of the Boundary Division of the Survey Department.
- Courtenay Boyle, Assistant Secretary to the Local Government Board.
- William Fraser LLD, Deputy Keeper of Records, Scotland.
- Charles Benjamin Forsey, Joint Secretary to the Board of the Inland Revenue.
- Frederick Ebenezer Baines, Assistant Secretary of the General Post Office and Inspector General of Mails.

== Order of St Michael and St George ==
Appointments to the Order of Saint Michael and Saint George were published in The London Gazette on 6 June 1885.

=== Knights Grand Cross of the Order of Saint Michael and Saint George (GCMG) ===
- The Right Honourable Lord Carrington, on appointment as Governor of the Colony of New South Wales.
- Major-General Sir Andrew Clarke, RE, KCMG, CB, CIE, Inspector General of Fortifications and Director of Works.
- Sir Anthony Musgrave KCMG, Governor of the Colony of Queensland.
- Sir Frederick Aloysius Weld KCMG, Governor General of the Straight Settlements.

=== Knight Commander of the Order of Saint Michael and Saint George (KCMG) ===
- Adams George Archibald CMG, late Lieutenant-Governor of the Province of Nova Scotia, in the Dominion of Canada.
- Charles Mills CMG, Agent-General in London for the Cape of Good Hope.
- Major-General Peter Henry Scratchley RE, CMG, Her Majesty's Special Commissioner for the Protected Territory in New Guinea.
- Alexander Stuart, Premier and Colonial Secretary of New South Wales.

=== Companion of the Order of Saint Michael and Saint George (CMG) ===
- James Francis Garrick, Agent-General in London for Queensland.
- Edward Noel Walker, Colonial Secretary of the Island of Jamaica.
- Lorenzo, Marquis Cassar Dessain, lately a Member of the Council Government of Malta.
- Edward Fairfield, of the Colonial Office.
- Frederick Thomas Sargood, Minister of Defence of the Colony of Victoria.
- Major-General Major Francis Downes RA, Commandant of the Volunteer Forces of the Colony of South Australia.
- Colonel Charles Fyshe Roberts, late Major in the Royal Artillery, in command of the Artillery forces of the Colony of New South Wales.
- Lieutenant-Colonel Edward Robert Drury, late Acting-Commandant of the Volunteer Forces of the Colony of Queensland.

== Order of the Star of India ==
Appointments to the Order of the Star of India were published in The London Gazette on 6 June 1885.

=== Knight Commander of the Star of India (KCSI) ===
- Colonel Edward Ridley Colborne Bradford CSI, Madras Staff Corps, Agent to the Governor-General.

=== Companion of the Order of the Star of India (CSI) ===
- Herbert John Reynolds, Bengal Civil Service.
- James Macnabb Cuningham MD, Surgeon-General, Indian Medical Department.
- The Nawab Surfuraz Khan of Dera.
- Colonel Michael Weekes Willoughby, Bombay Staff Corps.
- Major Frederick Mercer Hunter, Bombay Staff Corps.

== Order of the Indian Empire ==
Appointments to the Order of the Indian Empire were published in The London Gazette on 6 June 1885.

=== Companion of the Order of the Indian Empire (CIE) ===
- Major Robert Parry Nisbet, Bengal Staff Corps.
- Francis Day, Deputy Surgeon-General (Retired), Medical Department, Madras.
- James Baboneau Nickterlien Hennessey, late Deputy Superintendent, Indian Survey Department.
- Duluptram Dayabhoy.
- Captain Adalbert Cecil Talbot, Bengal Staff Corps, Political Agent, Bikanir State.
- James Burgess, Archaeological Surveyor and Reporter to Government, Bombay.
- George Hamnett, Inspector-General, Registration Department, Madras.
- Ramaswami Mudaliar.

== Knight Bachelor ==
Appointments of Knight Bachelor were published in Times, London on 6 June 1885.

- Henry Christopher Mance, inventor of the heliograph.
- Peter Eade, late Mayor of Norwich.
- George Clement Bertram, Bailiff of the Island of Jersey.
- Captain Edward Walter, Commanding Officer of the Corps of Commissionaires.
- Mr Willis, Accountant-General to the Navy.
