= Francis Bolton =

British Army officer

Sir Francis John Bolton (1831–1887) was a British Army officer, known also as a telegraphic and electrical engineer.

== Life ==
The son of Dr. Thomas Wilson Bolton, surgeon, of London and Manchester, he enlisted in the Royal Artillery, in which he rose to be a non-commissioned officer, getting his first step as acting bombardier at Halifax, Nova Scotia. He obtained a commission as ensign in the Gold Coast artillery corps on 4 September 1857, and served in the expedition against the Krobo people, a small, prosperous ethnic group living east of Accra, in September, October, and November 1858, being present at the action of Krobo Heights on 18 September. He was promoted to be lieutenant on 9 November In June and July 1859 he was adjutant in the successful expedition against the Danquah rebels.

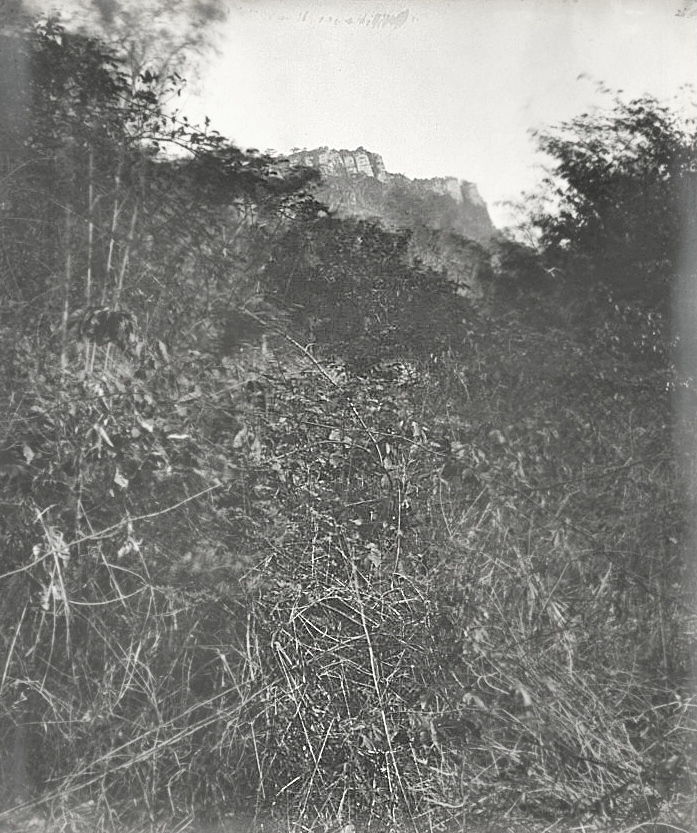
"Krobo Hill", 1890s photograph, now Krobo Mountain, Ghana

On his return to England Bolton was transferred to the 12th Regiment of Foot and promoted as captain on 21 September 1860. He was for several years engaged with Captain Philip Howard Colomb R.N. in developing a system of visual signalling, applicable to naval and military operations, which was adopted by the authorities. He also invented and developed an application of the oxy-calcium light for night signalling. The Army and Navy Signal Book was compiled by Bolton and Colomb, assisted by an officer of Royal Engineers, and was used during the British Expedition to Abyssinia of 1867/8.

From 1867 to 1869 Bolton was deputy-assistant quartermaster-general and assistant instructor in visual signalling at the School of Military Engineering at Chatham, under Captain Richard Hugh Stotherd, the instructor in telegraphy. He was promoted on 8 July 1868 to an unattached majority in consideration of his services in army signalling. Bolton was largely instrumental in 1871 in founding the Society of Telegraph Engineers and Electricians, of which he became honorary secretary. He edited its Journal, and was afterwards vice-president.

In 1871 Bolton was appointed by the Board of Trade under the Metropolis Water Act to be water examiner to London. He was promoted to be lieutenant-colonel on 15 June 1877, and retired from the military service with the honorary rank of colonel on 1 July 1881.

Bolton was knighted in 1884. He died on 5 January 1887 at the Royal Bath Hotel, Bournemouth, Hampshire.

== Works ==
Bolton designed the displays of coloured fountains and electric lights which formed prominent features of the exhibitions at South Kensington from 1883 to 1886; they were worked from the central tower under his personal superintendence. He was the author of:

- London Water Supply, 1884, of which a new edition, with an exposition of the law relating to water companies by Philip Arthur Scratchley, was published in 1888;
- Description of the Illuminated Fountain and of the Water Pavilion, 1884, originally delivered as a lecture at the International Health Exhibition.

== Family ==
Bolton married in 1866 Julia, second daughter of R. Mathews of Oatlands Park, Surrey; she survived him.

== See also ==
- John Hick

== Notes ==
Attribution

This article incorporates text from a publication now in the public domain: Stephen, Leslie, ed. (1885). "Bolton, Francis John". Dictionary of National Biography. Vol. 1. London: Smith, Elder & Co.
