= Mary Morris Knowles =

English Quaker poet and abolitionist

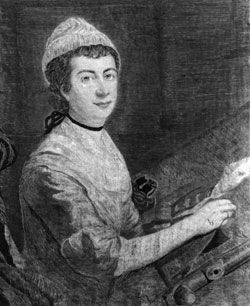
self portrait done in Needlework of Mary Morris Knowles, c.1776 (Royal Collection)

Mary Morris Knowles (1733–1807), was an English Quaker poet and abolitionist. She spoke out in favour of choosing her own spouse, argued on behalf of scientific education for women, helped develop a new form of needle painting, confronted Samuel Johnson, defied James Boswell, and supported abolition of the slave trade and slavery. She published several works under her maiden name, Morris.

== Life ==
=== Early life ===
She was born into a prosperous family of third generation Quakers in Rugeley, Staffordshire, in 1733. Mary was brought up with practical education in her parents' house, but her education also spanned many secular subjects. She learned to write poetry, cite the classics, employ Latin phrases and analyze current scientific theories. Accomplished in the arts, she wrote a ‘fine hand’, learned to paint and draw, held a good understanding of botany and was apparently fluent in French.

She did not confine her friendships to Quakers. It was during her teens that she formed a lasting friendship with the younger Anna Seward, the daughter of an Anglican cleric in nearby Lichfield. Anna's father, the Reverend Thomas Seward was a supporter of education for girls, and Anna had also had a full education and studied science, English translations of the classics, and poetry. Mary also found a friend in a contemporary of her parents, Sampson Lloyd II of Birmingham. Lloyd's family business became the banking dynasty, founders of Lloyds Bank. Mary referred to members of this prominent family as her 'cousins' and may have been related to them on her mother's side. It was at the Lloyds' home, known simply as the Farm, in the 1750s where Mary designed some of the gardens.

=== The young woman ===
Mary resisted family and religious authority. She exercised her right to choose her own spouse: amongst Quakers during that time it was a high priority for women to be married suitably. This led to a fiery dispute between Mary and John Kendal, a Quaker disciplinarian, and to Mary writing "Memoirs of M.M., Spinster of the Parish", a letter to Kendall but also a social text showing how opinions differed concerning the education and conduct of women, the preparations for domestic life and particularly a woman's freedom to choose her spouse. Within the "Memoirs" Mary also wrote a short essay entitled "the Pudding Making Mortal". In this essay she argued that since "accidents may happen to the best puddings in the world," every housewife should be taught science. It compares how she and other well-educated sisters would react to a bursting bag of pudding compared to others not so well-educated. She believed, similarly to her contemporary Elizabeth Carter, that intellectual rigour could be applied to cooking as in other areas of study.

=== Marriage ===
In 1767, at the age 34, Mary Morris married Thomas Knowles, a Quaker apothecary from Yorkshire, but she resolved not to become ‘a poor passive machine ... a mere smiling Wife.’ Despite her earlier resistance to marriage, she wed happily. By April 1768 she was six months pregnant. She experienced a difficult childbirth, and recorded her fears and sufferings through letters and heroic poems. In July 1768 Mary almost died delivering her son, Morris, who lived for one day. After her recovery from the childbirth, Mary and Thomas moved to Birmingham, which was closer to her mother as well as offering an expanding array of economic, social, and cultural opportunities. It is here that she changed their lives through her artistic accomplishment, despite the deaths of her younger sister and mother.

==== Needlework ====
It was during the 1770s that British arts in many forms flourished under the patronage of King George III and Queen Charlotte. While the king favored the high minded historical paintings of Benjamin West, an American born artist, the queen took a special interest in art made by women. In 1768 she had helped to establish a needlework school for women at Ampthill in Buckinghamshire.

It was also during this time that highly skilled needlework artists, like Mary Knowles, and Mary Delaney, practiced specialized forms of needlework, for example one known as 'printwork'. Printwork consisted of pictures drawn onto a silk or fine linen background, worked in lines of fine black silk to suggest engravings. In the late 1760s and early 1770s needlework artists started to develop a new form of their art known as 'needle painting'. Needle painting replicated the appearance of a painted subject through crewel embroidery, using worsted wool stitches to represent brush strokes. This required a very high level of skill for the needle painter, who aspired to outstanding achievement through the execution of their stitches, instead of the originality of the design.

Via connections either through West or simply by hearing of her "perfection in needlework", the queen in 1771 asked Mary to render a needle painting of a recent portrait of the King. The portrait that she was to replicate was one by the German-born court painter, Johann Zoffany. The painting was completed in 1771 and pictured the King at age 33, with a steady gaze, a ruddy healthy face, and a calm assured demeanor. To accomplish her needlework Mary would have first transferred the design of the painting onto the material. Then she would have to use a frame, which was only used by the most expert needle women because of the difficulty of preparing it. Working on the same scale as Zoffany, Mary used worsted wool, making large stitches for the background and smaller ones of flesh tones for the face and hands. Finally she stitched her initials and the date at the bottom corner.

When she was done, the King and Queen pronounced the work to be to their "entire satisfaction". The royal family then placed the needle painting on display at Kew Palace where it remained for more than 200 years. For her work Mary received a 'gift' of 800 pounds from Queen Charlotte. Financed by this payment, Thomas studied medicine at Edinburgh and took a medical degree at Leyden. Mary also gained the friendship of the King and Queen. With this she could use her social access to seek political favor and exercise real political power.

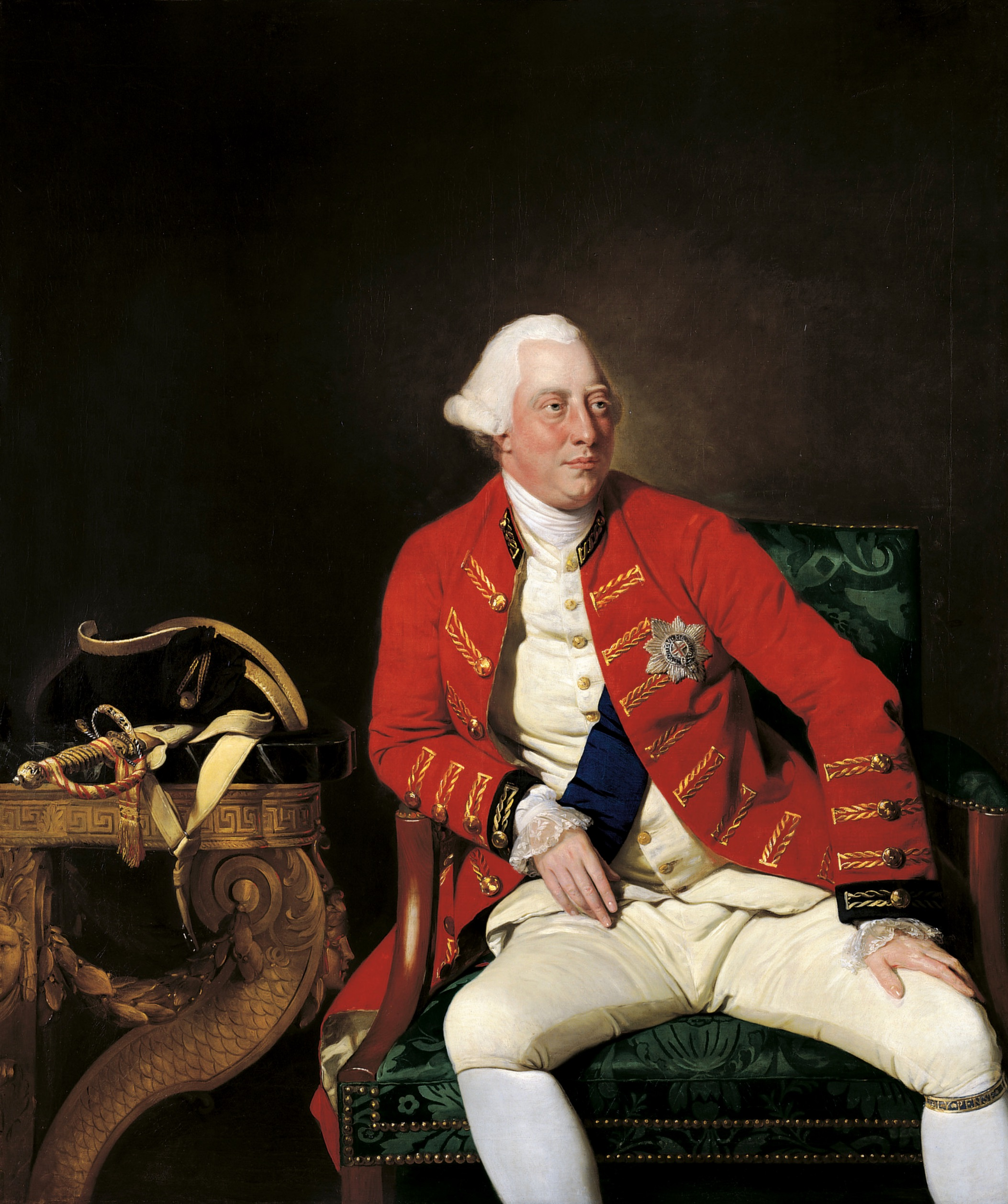
Johann Zoffany's Portrait of King George III, 1771

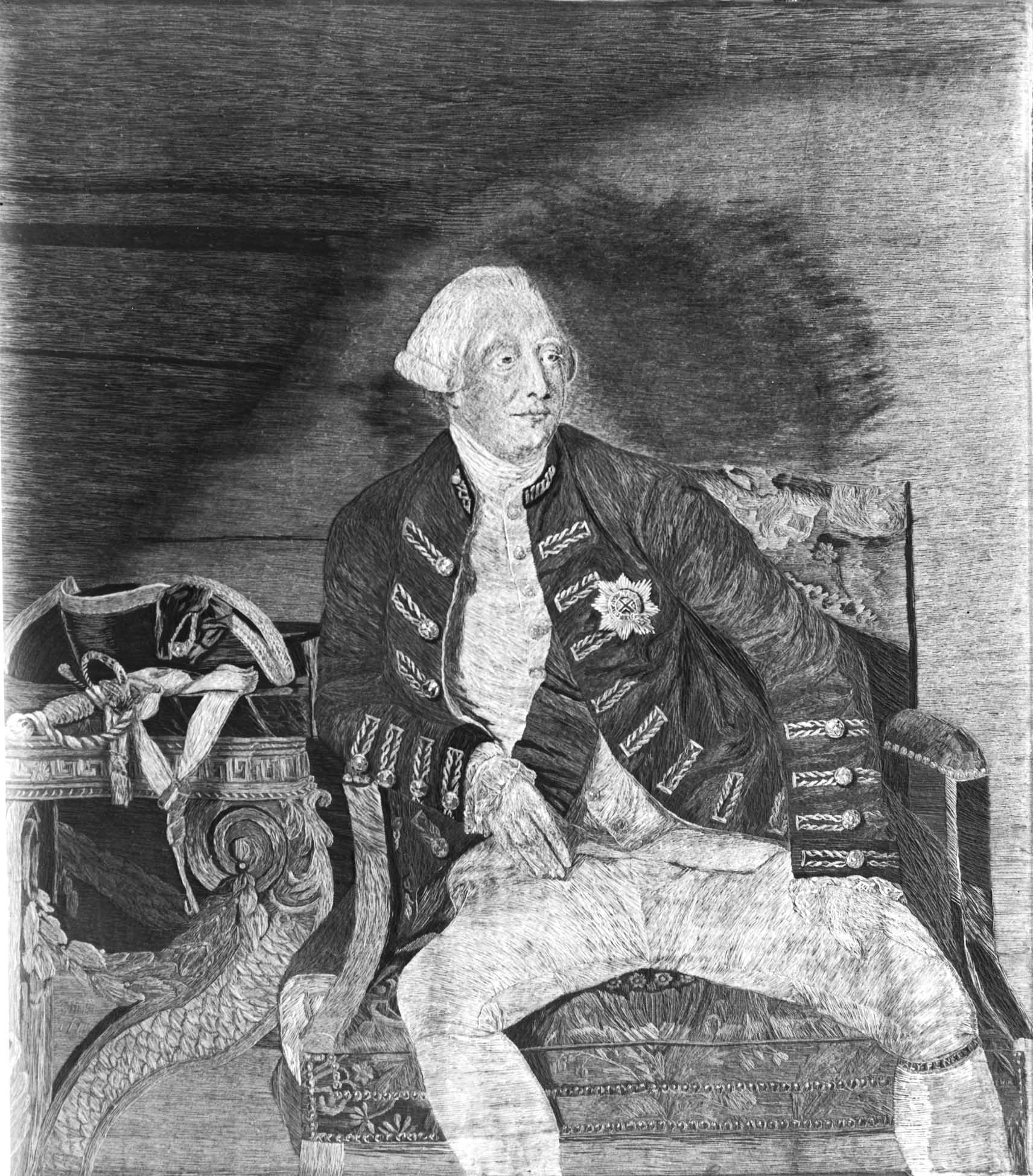
Mary Morris Knowles's Needle Painting of King George III, 1771

It was also at this time that her fame multiplied. The Birmingham Gazette published news of the needle painting. A London printer also published her poetic exchange as "Lavina" with "Clericus" under the title A Compendium of a Controversy on Water-Baptism. Although neither of these referred to Mary by name, they still brought her manuscript defense of Quaker beliefs into the public sphere.

==== Life after befriending Royalty ====
Along with the friendship of the Queen came the duty of waiting upon her. For the winter of 1771-1772 Mary stayed in London to await her audience with the Queen. While waiting, she socialized with Edward Dilly, a publisher, bookseller, dissenter, and radical whig. Edward shared his business and home with his brother Charles Dilly. The Dilly brothers also frequently provided lodging for their literary visitors. One visitor, James Boswell, who authored Account of Corsica, met Mary and wrote about her in his journal. He reveals that Mary, "did a head of the King for which the Queen made her a present of 800 pounds but said her work was invaluable." The indication that this money was given as a gift rather than as a payment stresses the Queen's personal, instead of financial, ties with Mary. The amount given by Boswell is consistent with other amounts given to female artists by the Queen, however there is no official record of payment to Mary for her needle painting.

After Thomas Knowles finished his study in Edinburgh, both he and Mary continued on to the Leyden University so he could take his degree. After submitting his thesis in Latin he obtained his degree and the couple toured Europe before settling in London, where he became a successful physician, and she became a sought-after participant in the dynamic cultural life of the capital. On 5 March 1773, at the age of 40, Mary gave birth to a baby boy, named George in honor of the King. In the same year Thomas became a member of the newly established Medical Society. In the following year he became a Licentiate of the Royal College of Physicians, thus entering into the highest ranks of the English medical profession. With the Knowles' move to the capital, Mary expanded her connections to include influential men, such as the Dilly brothers and a religious scholar, Dr. John Calder. Through influential friendships and social interactions, Mary entered into the cultural transformations that were changing public life in late Eighteenth Century London.

==== Life in the Capital ====
While Thomas worked to raise his position in the medical profession, Mary continued to establish connections with important literary and political men and women. Her previous writings, such as Compendium on Water Baptism, were republished multiple times, this time under her name instead of a pen-name. With her previous writings, as well as her connections with the Dilly brothers, she was able to come into contact with many influential literary minds. Most of these meetings were at the Dilly's frequent parties where guests discussed recent publications, political events, and social news. It was through these that Mary met Samuel Johnson. Johnson did display angry behavior towards Quakers, as well as comparing Quaker women preachers to dancing dogs. However it seems that their first meeting left Johnson with a positive view of Mary.

Mary also participated in religious discussions as a mentor for two young Anglicans from Rugeley in 1776. Jasper Capper, and his sister Mary Capper both became Quakers after becoming friends with Mary and seeking her religious advice. Mary Capper would go on to become a leading minister.

Around the time that Mary was discussing religion with the Cappers, she was also reading the recently published, Life of William Penn. This particular selection in reading material indicated her support for the Americans during a time when their revolution was testing the loyalties of English radicals and the pacifist principles of Quakers.

It was also during this time that Mary became a friend and advisor to Jane Harry, A young girl born of Thomas Hibbert, an English plantation owner, and Charity Harry, a Jamaican woman. Thomas had done quite well for himself as a plantation owner in Jamaica, He acquired three estates, became a Judge of the Grand Court and a member of the local governing assembly. His fine house is now the headquarters for the Jamaican National Heritage Society in Kingston. With English men far outnumbering English women, Thomas, like many of his peers, developed a long-term relationship with a Jamaican woman. As a free woman of mixed race, Charity Harry could read, write, and own property. Their daughters, Jane, and her younger sister Margaret, were both baptized in an Anglican church in Kingston, and were sent to England to be educated.

==== Women's Liberty and Jane Harry ====
Jane was placed under the care of Nathaniel Sprigg, in Barnes, Surrey, while her sister went to boarding school in London. The Sprigg's lived in an ancient manor house named, Barn Elms where they frequently entertained distinguished visitors from London, including Samuel Johnson and Mary Knowles. When Mary and Jane met, Jane had recently experienced the loss of her younger sister who died at boarding school. Jane turned to the Bible for comfort, and she and Mary became close friends and eventually the two women had a great impact on one another. Jane asked Mary for guidance, since Jane was disillusioned with Anglican rituals, Mary replied that,

"there are good people of all denominations; it is not the name, or the outward profession of any religion that can make us good, but a steady adherence to that which is right in our own consciences. Thou mayst be a very good Girl professing the religion of thy Education, as long as thou canst be satisfied with it, But if thou cans't not, i would advise thee to have recourse to that inward light which will guide thee into all truth."

This tolerant view of other denominations and a belief in the liberty and responsibility of Jane to choose her own religion, shows Mary's faith placed in inner convictions, instead of in membership in a particular religious group or practice of a certain form of religion. In time, Jane decided that she could no longer follow Anglican tradition and belief. Upon this decision her guardians, the Spriggs, turned her away from their home. She wrote for her father's support of her choice, which he evidently declined to provide, both financially and emotionally. So while Jane remained in London she boarded at the Knowles's, who also acted in place of her parents.

Jane also knew Samuel Johnson, to whom she had been introduced via her previous guardians. However, upon meeting him again after her separation with the Spriggs', Johnson refused to talk to her. In tears Jane asked Mary to plead her case to Johnson at the dinner party they were both attending in early April, 1778. It was from this that Mary's confrontation with Johnson began. The main issue, that of Jane Harry, is argued against by Johnson because he knew that admitting Jane's free choice in religion would subvert the established order and would have serious consequences for both women and men, thus he refused to forgive Jane. There would be three differing versions of their confrontation, One written by Boswell, another by Mary, and a third by Anna Seward. Boswell's version and Mary's version differ since Boswell's rendition favors Johnson while Mary's rendition favors her views and shows her successfully arguing her gender and religious differences by behaving politely. Her version also shows that she effectively defends Jane and her own religious beliefs in this mostly male company.

Jane would continue her ideas of equality, when in 1780, upon her father's death her cousin and not she, was named heir. After a brief confrontation with the cousin, she had an idea to go to Jamaica and free the slaves of her mother and instruct them in the principals of the Christian religion. However, due to the war she was unable to go.

Jane would marry an English Quaker and surgeon, Joseph Thresher in November 1782, and settle in Worcester. Jane would die two years later, in August 1784 after becoming mortally ill after giving birth to a baby boy in May of the same year.

==== Lombard Street, abolition, and the death of Thomas Knowles ====
In 1783 the Knowles's moved to Number 19, Lombard Street. Thomas was among a small group of men who in 1783 presented a petition to the king as the struggle between Britain and America came to an end. In the same year, Thomas also became a part of the Quaker Committee to consider action concerning slavery and the slave trade. He also met in a smaller group of Friends in an informal association "to consider what steps could be them be taken for the Relief and Liberation of the Negro Slaves in the West Indies and the discouragement of the slave trade on the coast of Africa."

On 16 November 1786, Thomas Knowles died at the age of 52 from a fever that he caught from one of his patients. leaving behind Mary at the age of 53 and their son George, age 13. He left behind his medical practice, his home and his position in the Eastern Dispensary in Alie Street, Whitechapel; which was known for treating poor patients.

Now a wealthy widow, Mary Morris Knowles subscribed to the London Abolition Committee, now larger and more religiously diverse. The Committee decided to focus on ending the slave trade, and in 1787 it assumed leadership for involving the public to support parliamentary action. By 1788, the committee was conducting a nationwide campaign. When an unnamed friend asked her to write a poetic inscription for a tobacco box, Knowles penned the following couplets, not intended for publication:

Tho various tints the human face adorn
To glorious Liberty Mankind are born;
O, May the hands which rais'd this fav'rite weed
Be loos'd in mercy and the slave be freed!

She had defended women’s liberty in her debate with Johnson in 1778, and she now extended this principle to all humans. The arguments she expressed were rational, nonsectarian, and based on universal rights. Individual British and American Quakers in the 1760s and 1770s, like John Woolman, had taken the lead in ‘moralizing consumption’ and suggesting abstention from slave products as a way to diminish the profits of slavery. The abstention movement in Britain did not take hold until the 1790s, and then it focused on sugar. Knowles wrote her poem earlier and she focused on a product more often purchased and used by males.

=== Life as a Widow ===
After her husband's death, Mary sought solace in her strong religious faith and found comfort by exchanging letters with several female friends. She became a wealthy widow and an affectionate parent for her son George. As a widow and "sole executrix" of her husband's will, Mary retained all of her husband's wealth and belongings. With this she also gained a boost in her social status. Although rumors circulated about her remarrying she never did.

The years following her husband's death are not well documented. However, it seems that she left the house that she had occupied with her husband in Lombard Street and may have moved to Basinghall Street, Number seven. Based on Anna Seward's letters, it seems that Mary traveled the country during 1787. Sometime during 1787 and early 1788 Mary developed an interest in Animal Magnetism and the supernatural. Animal Magnetism was in vogue during this time and was the art of removing maladies by volition, aided with gentle motion of the hands. This interest in the supernatural seems to have been short lived.

Mary also threw herself into the work that her husband had started with the abolitionists. Mary viewed Liberty as a birthright for all, with the idea of Liberty encompassing politics as well as religion. She specifically supported Liberty for all, regardless of skin color and called for the liberation of slaves.

In 1789 Mary and George returned to London where George entered into a counting house and Mary moved into No.53 Lombard Street. Here she continued to practice Quaker hospitality by opening her house to her relatives and fellow friends. In 1791 she published a page and a half in the Gentleman's Magazine of her own account of her dialogue. This was in response to Boswell's presentation of her dialogue with Samuel Johnson in his two folio volume Life of Samuel Johnson, LL. D. Despite her taking a step back in the social and literary life of London since her husband's death, Mary now leaped into the most public literary arena by being published in the Gentleman's Magazine. However she took this leap to defend her friend and religion as well as to practice self-representation. She committed this radical act at the same time as the French Revolution presented the most serious challenge yet to English radicals.

=== Mary's Death ===
In January 1807 Mary was quite ill. This illness led to her death on the morning of February 3, 1807 in her home at Ely Place at the age of 73. During her illness, she was visited by many friends and family, including her son George who had remained unmarried. It was also during this time that she expressed extreme self-doubt and anxiety. This was due to her remorse over her past actions as well as her inability to, "feel the presence of Him, whom she sought ability to pray to and to worship; and upon whom she very frequently called for forgiveness." Anne Fry Capper attended to Mary on her deathbed and noted that Mary specifically questioned the value of her achievements. While her Quaker beliefs were beyond question, the social integration to which she had contributed now prompted new definitions of acceptable Quaker behavior, and now Mary herself seemed to question her past practice of Quakerism.

Even though she was full of self-doubt, Mary still expressed hope for her salvation. Her fame, wealth, and social status became burdens for her on her deathbed since they were all achieved by her testing the boundaries of her Quaker faith throughout her life. By admitting her fears and doubt, Mary became in death, much like during her life, an example for others. After her death her friends and acquaintances remembered her as many things, including a literary lady, a patriot, a politician, artist, and devoted Quaker. Her life and death demonstrate the complex connections interlacing religion, gender, and radicalism in the long eighteenth century. Mary was buried alongside her husband Thomas in the Quaker cemetery at Bunhill Fields. Her son George would join them there after his death in 1820. Her direct line of descendants ended with George's death.

As a radical, Mary Morris Knowles defended liberty for women and Africans and reminded consumers about the connection between tobacco and slavery. Her writings demonstrate that middling, as well as elite, women, found a wide range of ways to express their political opinions. Knowles’s seemingly private manuscripts expressing her political views were circulated and carefully preserved, bearing evidence to the importance of female participation during this formative period of the abolitionist anti-slave-trade campaign. An expanded definition of political participation reveals unexplored facets of abolition history and suggests rich resources for further research on the complex connections among gender, abolition, and political change.

== Mary's Letters and Writings ==
Mary Morris Knowles’s letters and writings can be found in:

- The Library of the Religious Society of Friends, London;
- The British Library;
- New York Historical Library, New York City.

== Bibliography ==
- James Boswell, Life of Samuel Johnson
- John Brewer,Pleasures of the Imagination, Farrar, Straus and Giroux, 2000
- GENTLEMAN’S MAGAZINE, 1791
- Letters of Anna Seward
- Judith Jennings, Gender Religion & Radicalism in The Long Eighteenth Century, Ashgate, 2006
