= Mary Moore-Bentley =

Australian writer and political candidate

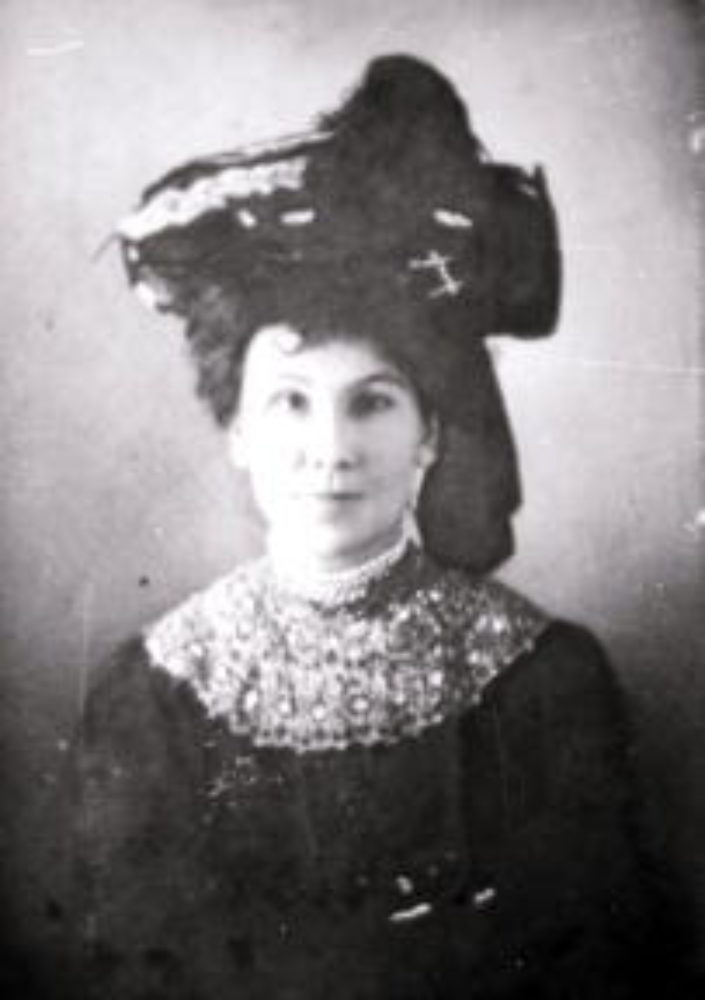
- Born: Mary Ann Bentley; 6 January 1865; Braidwood, New South Wales, Australia
- Died: 1 September 1953 (aged 88); Newcastle, New South Wales, Australia
- Other name: Mary Ling (married name)
- Political party: Independent
- Spouse: Henry Ling (m. 1897; div. 1906)

Mary Ann Moore-Bentley (6 January 1865 – 1 September 1953), also known as Mary Ling, was an Australian writer and parliamentary candidate. She was one of the first four women to stand for the Parliament of Australia, running unsuccessful as an independent Senate candidate in New South Wales at the 1903 federal election.

== Early life ==
Born in Braidwood to English-born Methodists George Bentley and Mary Ann, née Moore, young Mary and her two younger brothers was primarily educated at home by her mother. She and her sister visited the Sydney International Exhibition in 1879, but when their money ran out they were forced to work as domestic servants. In 1880 the family settled at Marrickville and Mary became a nursemaid to the children of Colonel Charles Roberts. She married postal clerk Henry Hill Ling on 3 September 1889 at the Salvation Army barracks in Burwood; they separated in 1897 and divorced in 1906.

== Politics ==
Moore-Bentley's first novel was rejected in 1890; she published A Woman of Mars; or, Australia's Enfranchised Woman in 1901. A Georgist, she joined the Single Tax League in 1901 and was appointed to its council, although she only attended two meetings. In 1903, under the name "Mary Ann Moore Bentley", she was one of four women to contest the 1903 federal election, the first at which women were eligible to stand, although she was not formally supported by the league. Contesting the Senate in New South Wales, she described herself as "the working woman's candidate" and support free trade, abolition of state parliaments and a state bank in addition to Georgism. She received 18,924 votes (6.1%), outpolling the other New South Wales Senate candidate, Nellie Martel, by 400 votes.

== Later life ==
By 1906, Moore-Bentley's relations with her brothers, her nearest neighbours at Bangor where she lived, grew tense. A Psychological Interpretation of the Gospel (January 1917) received a US publication in Boston and Moore-Bentley sailed to America later that year; she was repatriated at government expense in 1918 and blamed her disappointing time in America on the "Secret Service" and the Australian government's misrepresentation of her anti-conscription activities. She retired to Menai, writing poems and children's stories. In 1943 she was committed to the Mental Hospital at Stockton in Newcastle, where she died in 1953. Her memoir, Journey to Durran Durra 1852–1885, which was written around 1935, was published in 1983.
