= Jane Harry =

Jamaican artist (1756–1784)

Jane Harry Thresher
- Born: Jane Harry; 1755; Jamaica
- Died: 1784 (aged 28–29); London, England
- Spouse: Dr Joseph Thresher
- Children: 1
- Parent(s): Thomas Hibbert and Charity Harry

Jane Harry Thresher called Jane Harry and Jenny Harry (1755–1784), Kingston, Jamaica, was an abolitionist, Quaker, and artist. She fought for the release of slaves owned by her family and the right to equal inheritance. She was born to Thomas Hibbert and Charity Harry. Her father had travelled from England to Jamaica where he bought several properties and later became a judge. Her mother was a free woman but was employed as the housekeeper of Hibbert. Sexual relations between staff and the wealthy were common in Jamaica, and although of course possibly it may not have been, there is no evidence to suggest the union was not consensual. Certainly Hibbert remembered both Charity and Jane in his will.

== Early life and family ==
Harry was born the same year that her father built Hibbert House, which was used as a centre for the work of Hibbert. Hibbert and his business partners, Samuel Jackson and Nathaniel Spriggs, acted as factors for incoming slave ships coming from Africa, purchasing and reselling over 16,000 slaves for a profit in the hundreds of thousands.

It was a common practice in British colonies to send children of wealthy parents, even illegitimate ones, and including mixed race children, to England to provide education for them. This was in order to teach them the social skills and manners of a lady or a gentleman, and “avoid acquiring the vulgar manners of Negro domestics.” Harry was sent to England with her 4-year-old sister, Margaret, at the age of 13. Harry lived under the stewardship of the previous business partner of her father and slave trader Nathaniel Spriggs, who held a very well-established academic company in his circle, while her sister was sent to boarding school.

== Education ==
Unlike in the USA, mixed race women travelling from outside England to gain access to education seemed to experience little discrimination (being illegitimate was a far bigger social impediment), and they were raised with the religious and social ideals of Anglo-Saxon society. As a indicator of the high quality of education provided to Harry, she studied art under the tutelage of Sir Joshua Reynolds, the preeminent portraitist of the age, and one of the intellectuals that travelled in the circles of the peers of Harry's father, Nathaniel Spriggs. Access to education at that time was generally only available to those who could pay, as there was almost no free tuition available to the poor majority of the population, so Harry's wealthy parent gave her a high degree of privilege with her ability to travel abroad. It can be inferred by the nature of her teacher that Harry's art was portraiture but we have no way of knowing, as unfortunately, no work credited to Harry survives, though there is likely some in existence that has not been assigned to her person.

However, we do know that Harry won an award for her artwork in 1778, receiving a gold medal from the Society for the Encouragement of the Arts, Manufacturing, and Commerce, based in London.

== Quakerism ==
Harry converted to the religious pursuit of Quakerism following the death of her young sister, Margaret, while she was at boarding school. After her sister's death, she found solace in a woman she met through Sprigg's intellectual social circle, Mary Morris Knowles. Quakers were some of the first to support the growing British abolitionist movement, to outlaw slavery, as they saw no difference between the souls of slaves, black or white, and the highest-born society figures. Through her friendship with Knowles, Harry encountered what the modern era might define as feminist attitudes, as although it was still a matter of dispute within Quakerism, Knowles enacted the Quaker right to refuse marriage (on more than one occasion), and even after she wed 'she resolved not to become ‘a poor passive machine ... a mere smiling Wife.’ Although Knowles almost certainly would not have considered herself as one, she has also been interpreted as a queer activist as well.

Quakerism was a diversion from typical religious pursuits of the period. This was a non-issue for Harry, but it was considered controversial in her high-born social circle, and she lost several acquaintances for her religious ideologies, who believed that she should have remained aligned with the religious teachings encouraged and provided by the majority of society. Particularly by her colleague in her social circles, Samuel Johnson.

Hibbert himself did not approve of her religious change and refused to financially support her, even after she wrote a 28-page letter detailing the events that had occurred in England leading her to choose Quakerism, and how the event of her sister's death had caused her to lose faith in the religious instruction of the Church of England. Her benefactor, Nathaniel Spriggs, informed her that she was no longer welcome to reside with him under his care following her change of religious pursuit. Harry instead found her own financial support and acquired a job working for the wealthy Quaker Sampson Lloyd as a governess for his fifteen children, and living with her friend Knowles. This was a job commonly entrusted to women with her level of education (although the rarity of young educated black women in England made her unusual in the role). The Lloyd family was a generous beneficiary and supporter of the abolition movement, focusing their efforts on Jamaica from their home in England.

== Activism ==
Harry's alignment with Quakerism, as well as the intersection of her race and gender, seem to be two indications and encouragers towards her life as an activist and abolitionist. Her experiences of slavery as a child encouraged her involvement with the abolitionist movement. Her most notable efforts in abolition came after her father's death in the year 1780. Harry was left a small portion of his estate, £2000, a large sum in those days, but her legitimate male relative, Thomas Hibbert Jr, was left £100,000.

She immediately addressed a bid to gain the same inheritance and was refused, as Thomas claimed she was illegitimate and not accepted by her father, despite the 28-page affectionate letter addressed to him only several years prior. Her mother Charity was also given £1000, a small property, and perhaps most importantly, all of the slaves that had been in Hibbert's possession. Harry wrote to her mother expressing a desire to free the slaves owned by her mother and teach them in the religious instruction of Quakerism.

Harry resolved to free these slaves as she had studied ethics only a year earlier. Further, Quakerism at this period held a clear stance for the abolition of slavery. There was a known extension of Christian Liberty to include a concept of Human Liberty, and Quakers had lobbied on several occasions to outwardly abolish slavery. Harry's efforts were thwarted by a hurricane in Jamaica, and the war between the colonies and England preventing safe sea travel.

Harry, and the rest of the Quakers were early agitators for the mass organised movement abolishing slavery in England in the late 18th-century. At the time her Quaker circle supported her travel, as did Dr. Joseph Thresher, the Quaker surgeon that Harry married at the time.

== Marriage and death ==
Jane Harry married Joseph Thresher in 1782 at a Quaker House in London, with Mary Knowles acting as a witness of their union. Their marriage certificate is one of only two preserved documents of its type from the 18th-century which record a union between a Black woman and a White man. Two years after their marriage, Harry gave birth to their first and only child. Pregnancy in the eighteenth century carried a lot of risk, and sadly after the birth Jane became ill and died at the age of 28. Her child died shortly after herself. Due to the international conflict between America and England, Harry was never able to complete her goal of returning home to free her mother's slaves and teach them in the practices of Quakerism. Instead, Harry left in her obituary, which appears in the Gentleman's Magazine 1784 addition, her final desire to free the slaves owned by her mother. It reads: "she has requested her husband that, if the said Negroes be liberated at her mother's death, he will pay the premium to the Island, for such liberation, if any should be required." Jane Harry was identified as an abolitionist in this obituary, three years before a national board of abolition was formed in Europe.
