= Jamaica National Heritage Trust =

- Abbreviation: JNHT
- Formation: 1958
- Type: Statutory body
- Purpose: To promote, preserve and develop Jamaica's material cultural heritage
- Headquarters: Hibbert House
- Location: 79 Duke Street, Kingston, Jamaica
- Coordinates: 17.973646°N 76.790727°W
- Region served: Jamaica
- Official language: English
- Main organ: Board of Trustees
- Parent organization: Jamaica Ministry of Information, Culture, Youth and Sports
- Staff: 131
- Website: http://www.jnht.com/

The Jamaica National Heritage Trust is responsible for the promotion, preservation, and development of Jamaica's material cultural heritage (buildings, monuments, bridges, etc.).

The organisation maintains the list of National Heritage Sites in Jamaica.

It is chartered by The Jamaica National Heritage Trust Act, 1985.

== History ==
In 1958, the Jamaica National Heritage Trust was founded as the Jamaica National Trust Commission, the name being changed to the present form in 1985.
