= Tabacalera of Tarragona =

Coordinates: 41.1143°N 1.2393°E

Tobacco box
- Interactive map of the Tobacco box area

General information
- Architectural style: Eclecticism
- Location: Passeig de la Independència, 3–15, Tarragona, Spain
- Completed: 1922

Design and construction
- Architect: Miquel Quesada Navarro

The Tabacalera of Tarragona, Spain, is a former tobacco factory classified as a monument and protected as a cultural property of local interest (BCIL). It is owned by the city council, which has restored parts of the complex.

== Description ==
It is a large complex consisting of various buildings arranged around a central square. The main façade, designed by architect Quesada, is decorated with classical motifs. The vertical surfaces are made of ashlar and artificial stone, featuring attached pilasters topped with floral capitals.

The main entrance features a structure with classical decorative elements. A pair of pilasters frame the door and connect it to two lateral structures, each topped with three sculptures, linked by a low wall with three round arches and iron grilles, along with a balustrade decorated with four urns.

The ground floor of the main buildings features a series of windows with round arches, while the upper floor has flat-topped windows. The façades are crowned with a classical entablature, friezes and cornices, pediments, and statues at the top.

== History ==
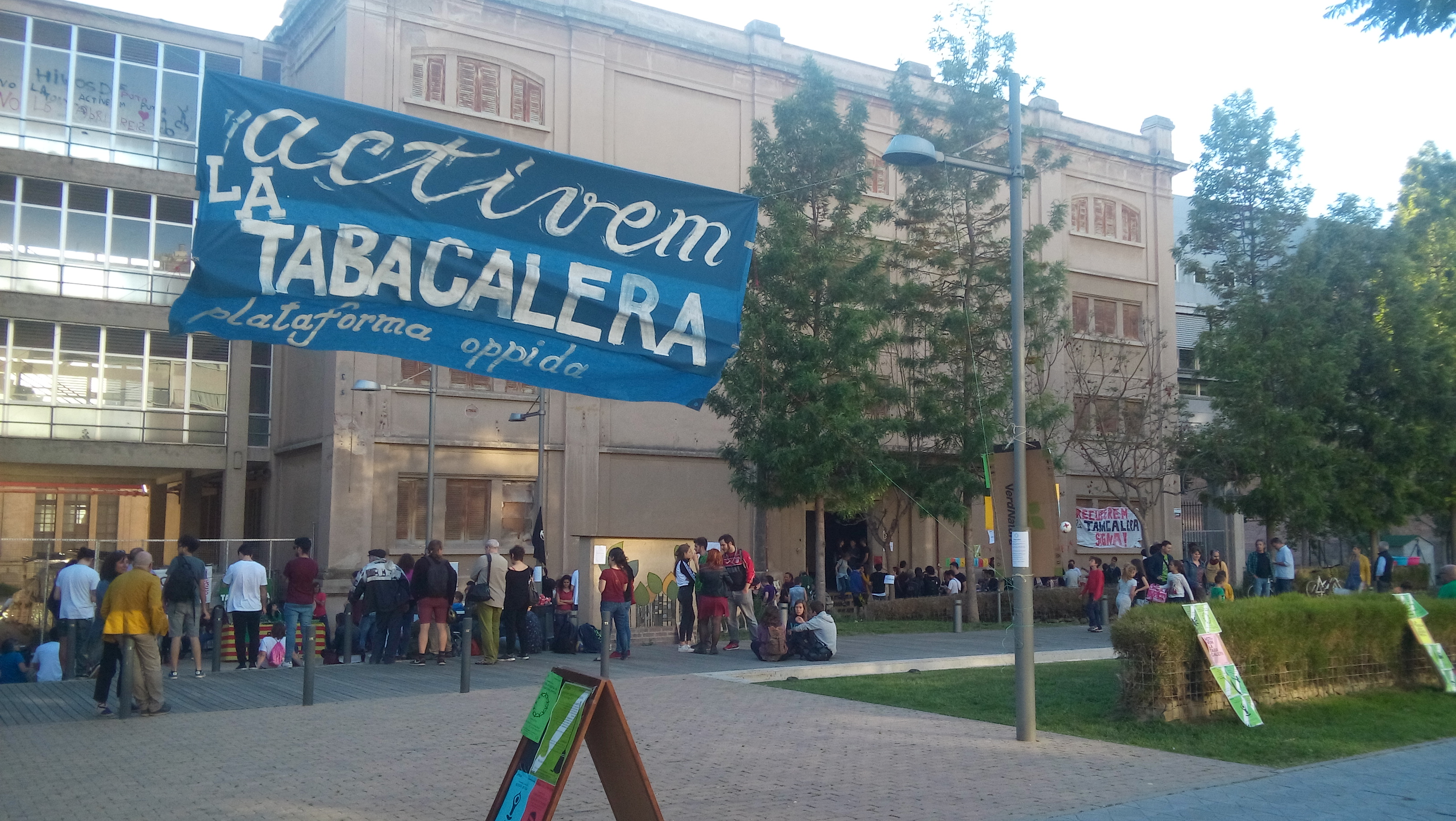
Temporary occupation of part of the complex (2017)

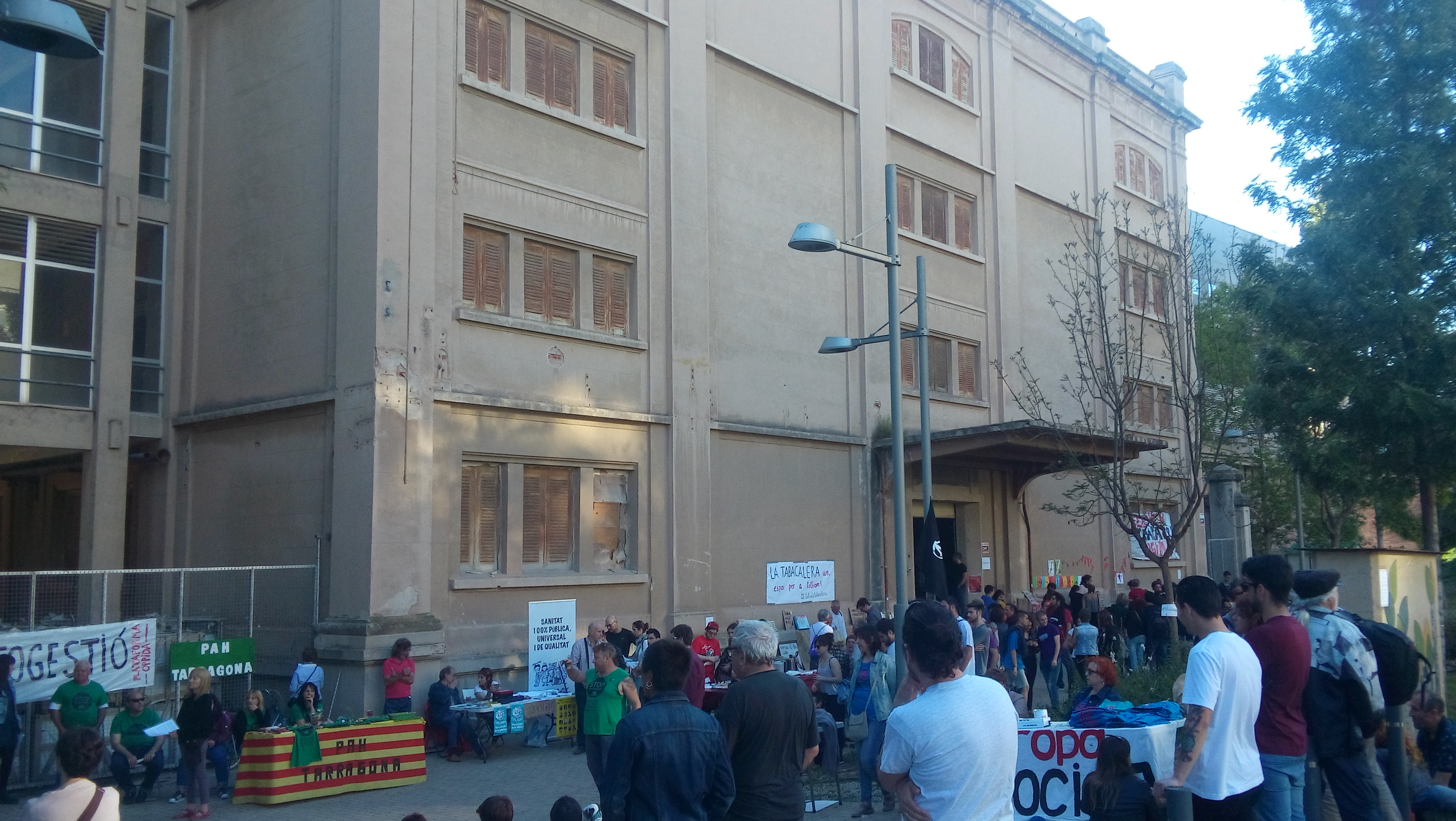
Temporary occupation of part of the complex (2017)

In 1922, 68,000 square meters of land were acquired for the construction of the factory by the engineering team of the tobacco leasing company, including Josep Guerra, Carles Dendariene, Josep Gasset, and Josep Delgado, under the direction of Francesc Bastos i Ansart.

The foundation stone was laid in 1923. The works continued under the direction of engineer Josep Tulla Planellas. The first challenge arose during excavation, as a Romano-Christian necropolis was discovered in the northwest area, delaying the project. In 1928, the minister of finance, José Calvo Sotelo, visited Tarragona and, upon evaluating the find, ordered the construction of the Museum, designed by Llorenç Rosell and Mossèn Serra i Vilaró, who would become its first director.

Also in 1923, the Francolí River overflowed, flooding the site. The factory was not fully repaired and operational until 1932. Between 1936 and 1939, machinery and staff were relocated to Sabadell and Vic.

The aforementioned team of engineers, directed by Francesc Bastos i Ansart, authored the factory's design. The riverside façade construction was entrusted to architect Miquel Quesada i Navarro, with a requirement for classical style decoration.

In July 2005, the Tarragona City Council acquired the Tabacalera complex from the multinational Altadis, which operated the factory until 2007. One of the initially planned uses for the building was to house the National Archaeological Museum of Tarragona.

Initial renovations by the city council in 2012 repurposed various spaces within the complex. Offices and training spaces for municipal services were installed. Rehearsal and recording rooms were also added, as well as a concert hall with a capacity of 500 people.

In January 2016, a citizens' platform made up of associations and individuals was created, proposing to convert Module 6 of the factory into a self-managed social center. The group symbolically occupied the space for two days, carrying out activities and denouncing its abandonment by the municipal administration.

In November 2022, a new cultural space was opened in Module 6.
