= Thomas Hibbert =

English merchant and planter

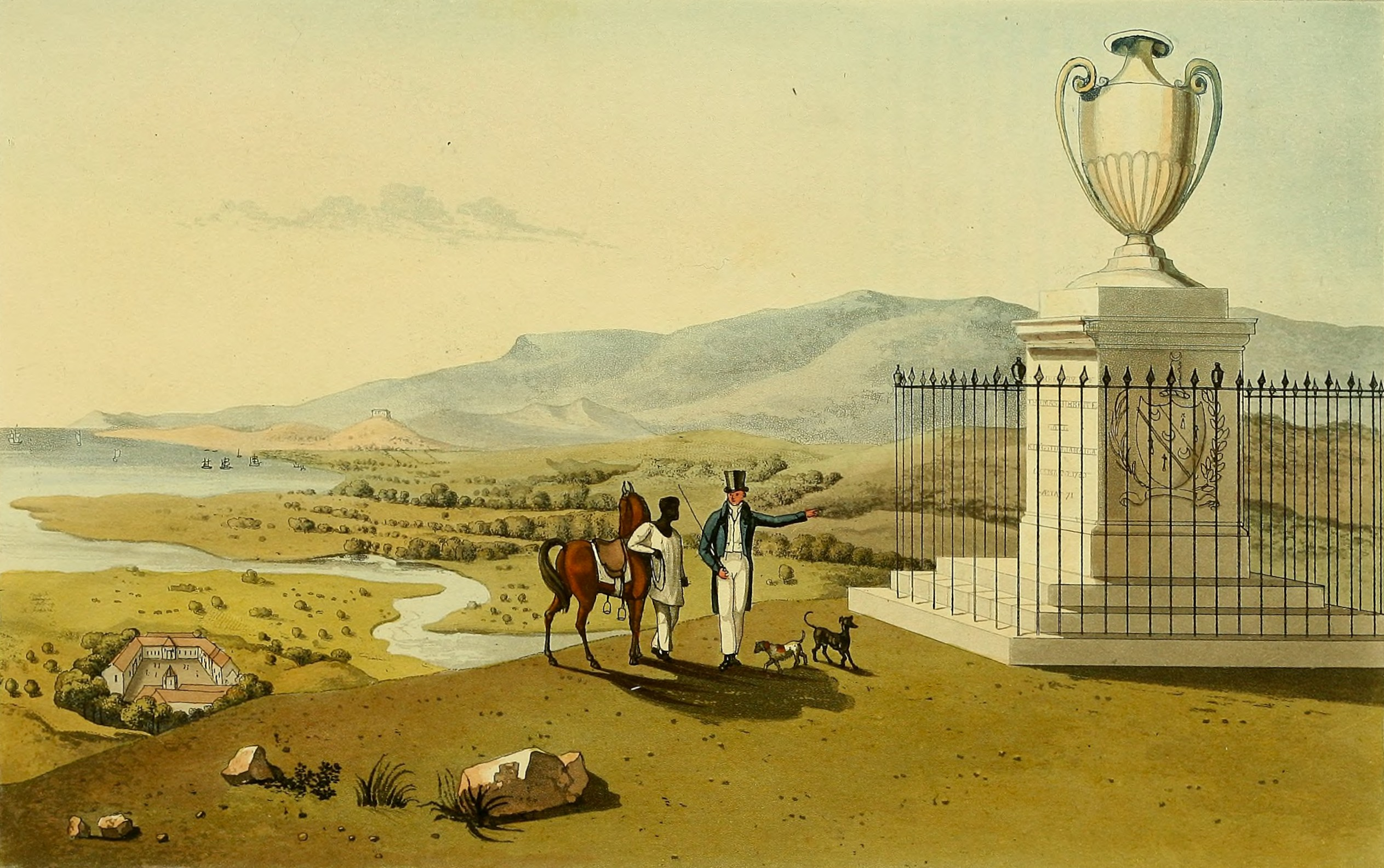
Monument to Thomas Hibbert

Thomas Hibbert (1710–1780) was an English merchant and planter who became a prominent figure in colonial Jamaica.

== Life ==
Thomas was the son of Robert Hibbert (1684–1762) and his wife Margaret Tetlow Mills. Born into a family owning cotton mills which supplied barter goods to businesses in the slave-trade, Thomas was the first of the Hibbert family to settle in Jamaica, arriving in 1734. His youngest brother, John (1732–1769), also lived in Jamaica, from 1754 until his death; his other brother, Robert, was father of Thomas, a co-founder of the family trading business Hibbert, Purrier and Horton, and of George, merchant and pro-slavery campaigner. His original remit was to redeem the bonds of slave traders at the point at which they sold their slaves in Kingston.

In 1754, he completed work on building Hibbert House which won a competition as the finest house in Kingston. In 1756 he was the speaker of the Jamaican House of Assembly.

Rather than marrying, Thomas cohabited with Charity Harry, by whom he had three daughters. The youngest died whilst still young, but Jane Harry and Margaret were sent to have an Anglican education in England. Margaret died while still at school. Jane was befriended by Mary Knowles and became a noted Quaker convert which ended her friendship with Samuel Johnson. Jane was left money by her father but always avoided mentioning that he was her father.
