= National Archaeological Museum of Tarragona =

Coordinates: 41°07′00″N 1°15′31″E

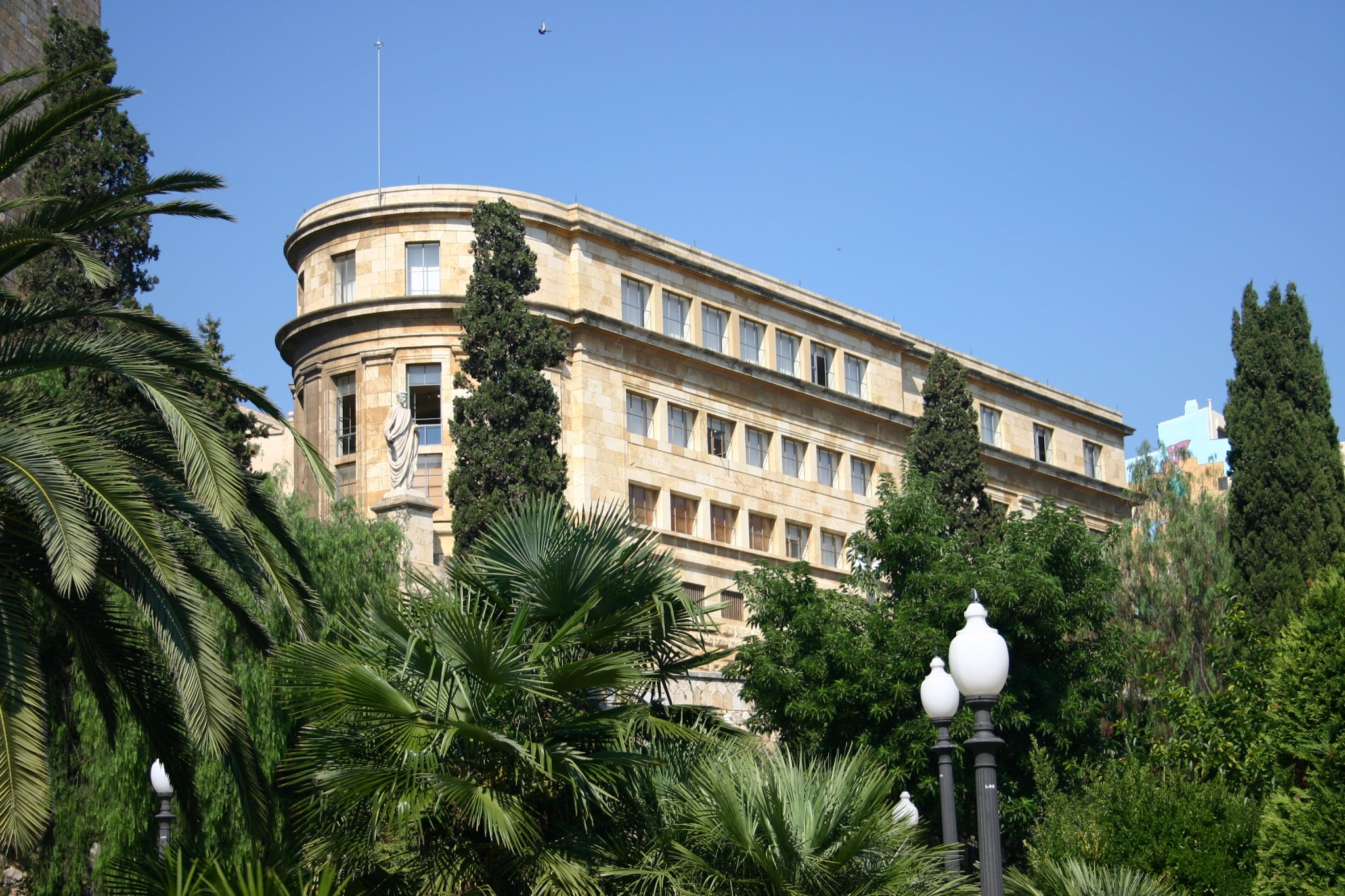
The museum's main building.

The National Archaeological Museum of Tarragona (Catalan: Museu Nacional Arqueològic de Tarragona, MNAT) is a public museum located in the city of Tarragona (Catalonia, Spain) focusing on its rich historical heritage and ancient remains. It includes archaeological findings of Tarraco's Roman and Early Christian past, as well as a library. The museum's origins lay in the 19th century, making it the oldest of its kind in Catalonia, with some collections assembling objects found from the 16th century onwards, but with most discoveries having taken place in the last 150 years.

It is part of the Roman Europe network of museums.

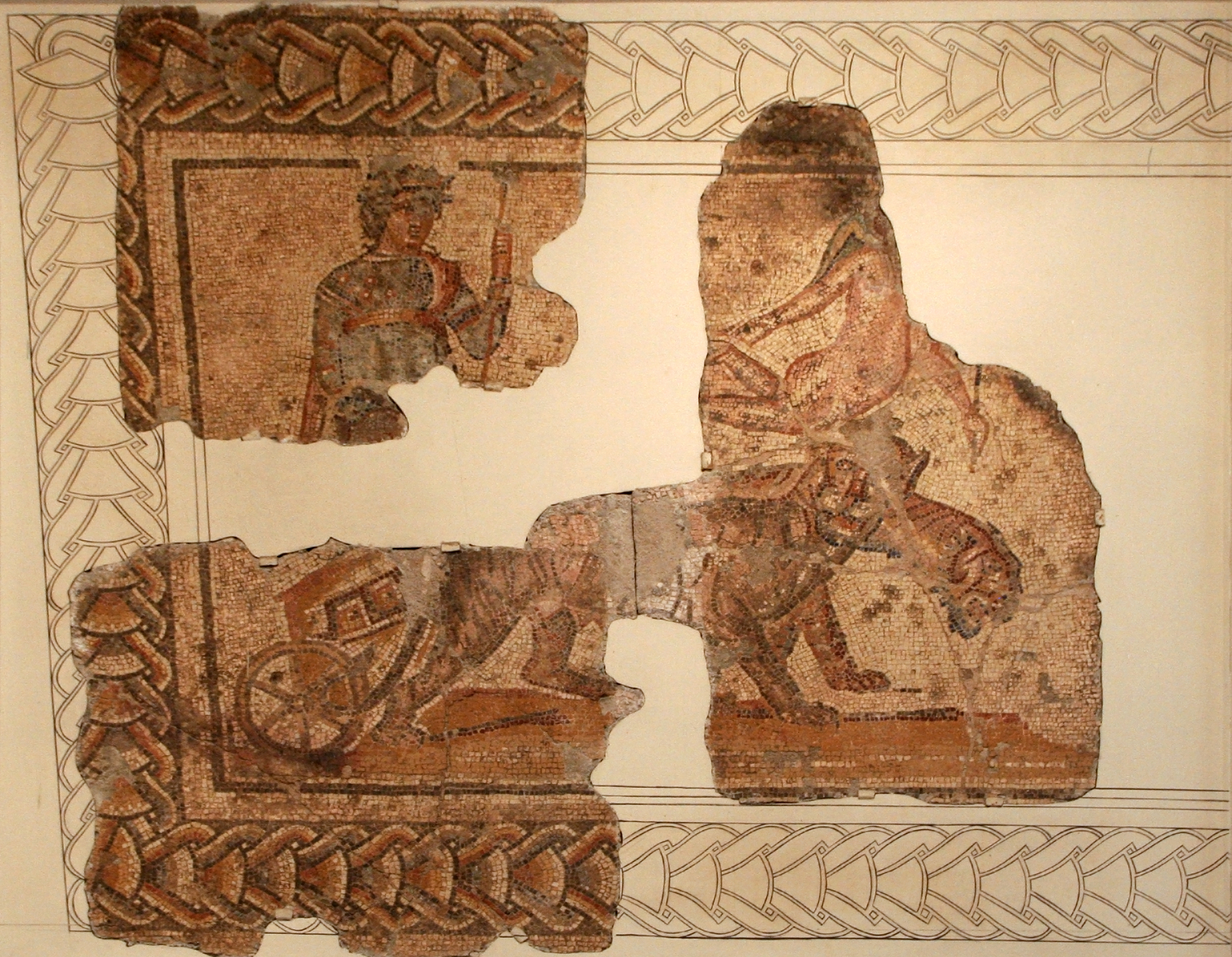
Mosaic del triomf de Bacus

== Gallery ==
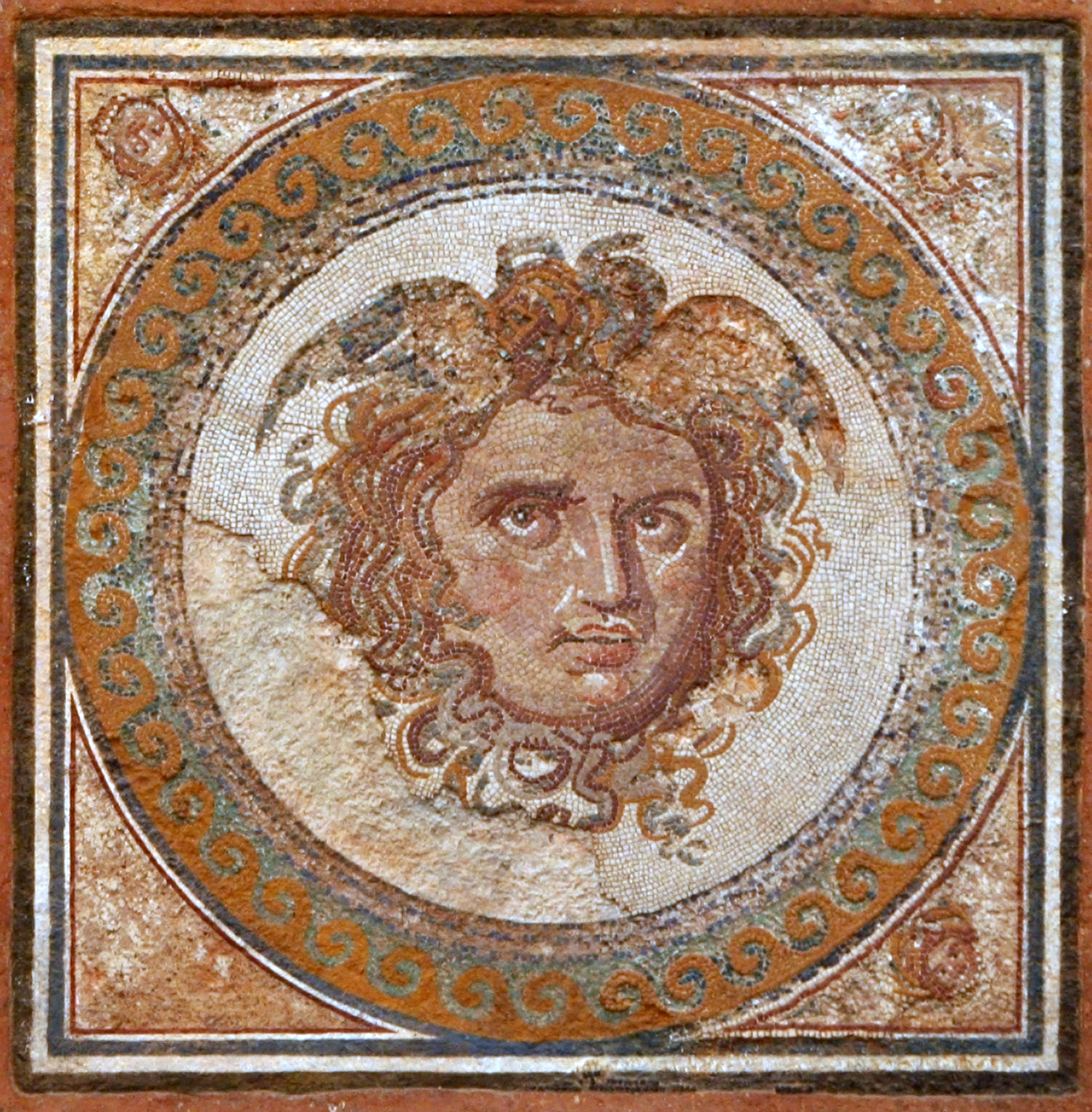
Mosaic of Medusa (Detail)

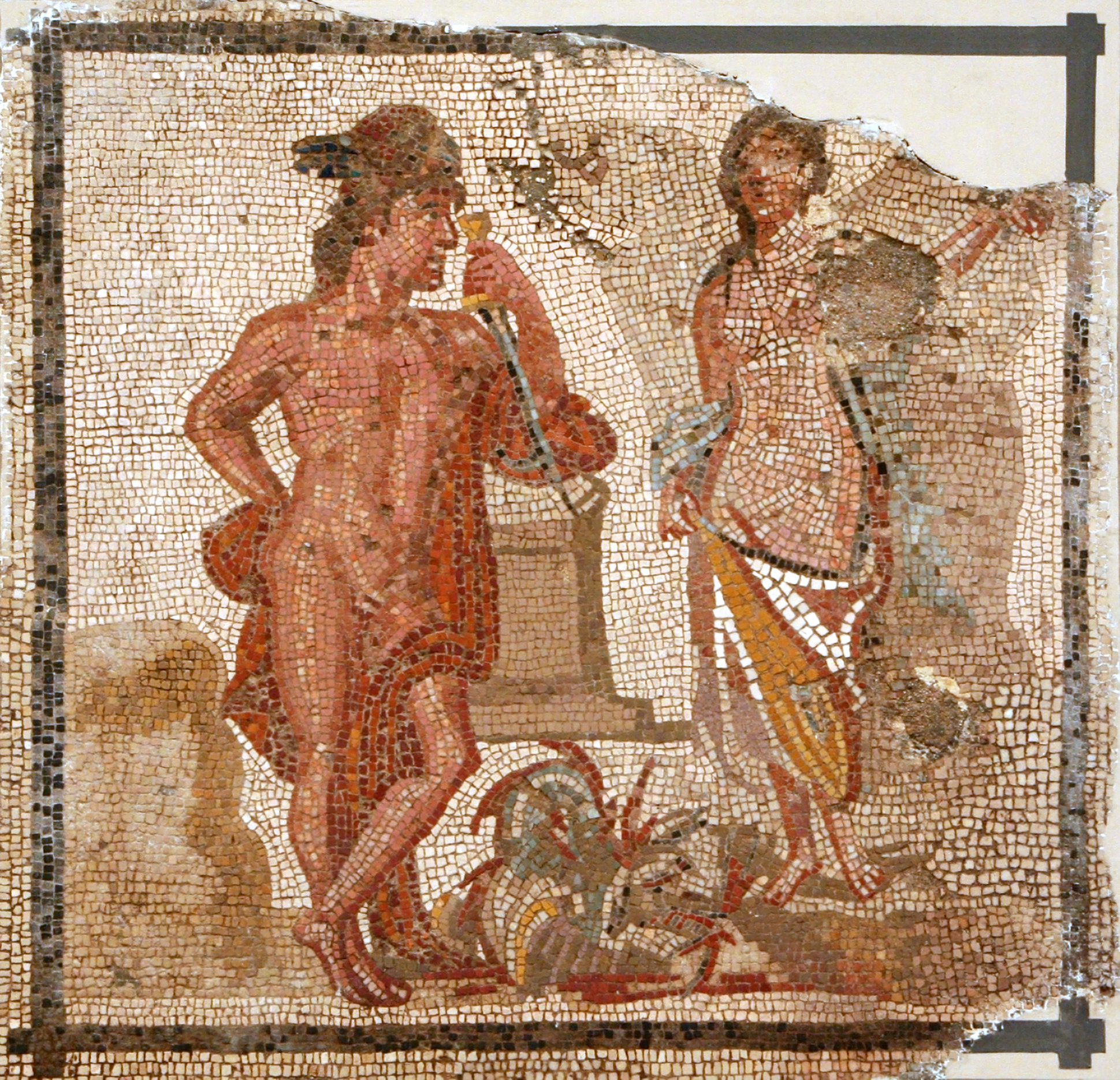
Mosaic of Medusa (Detail, Perseus and Andromeda)

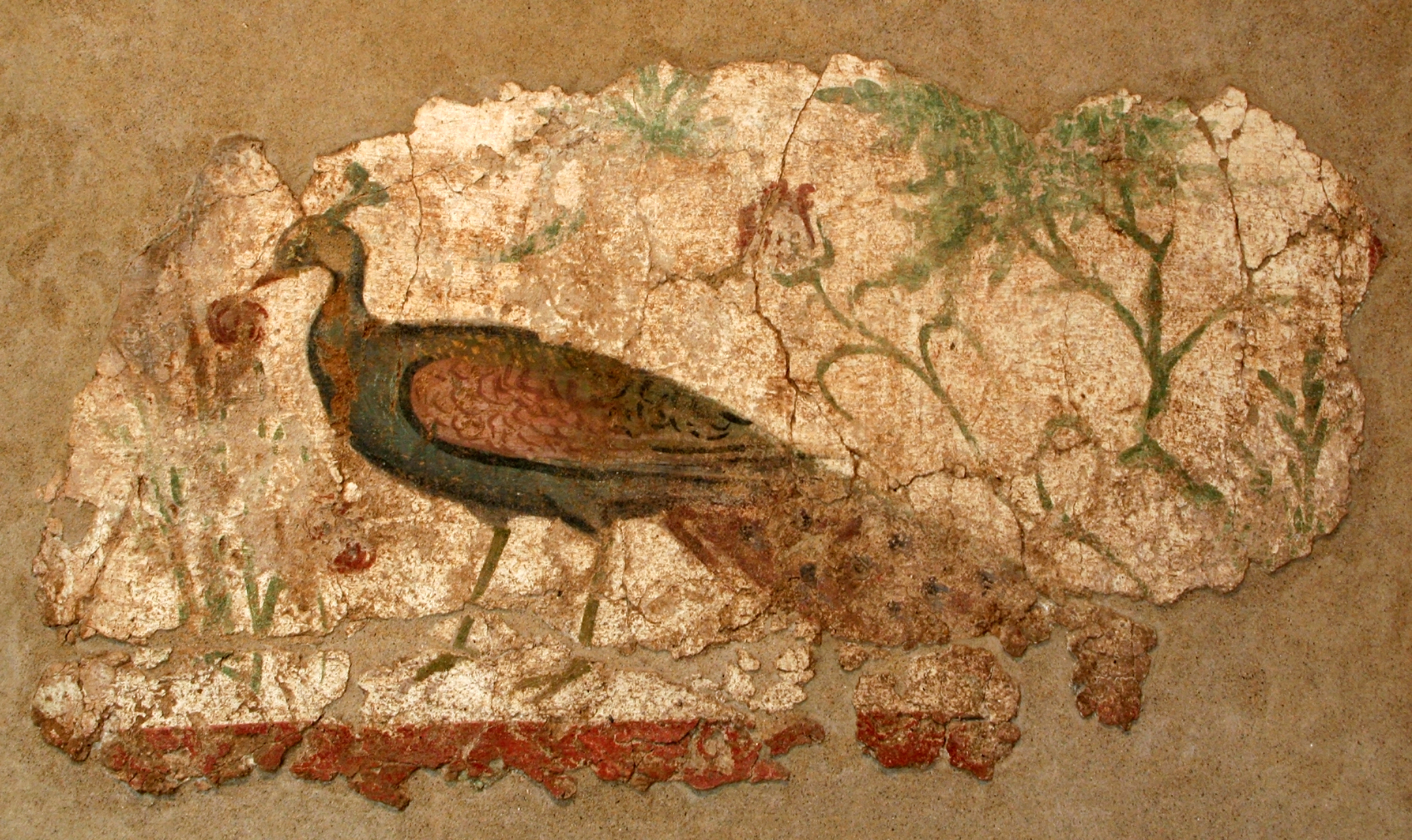
Mural Painting of a Peacock

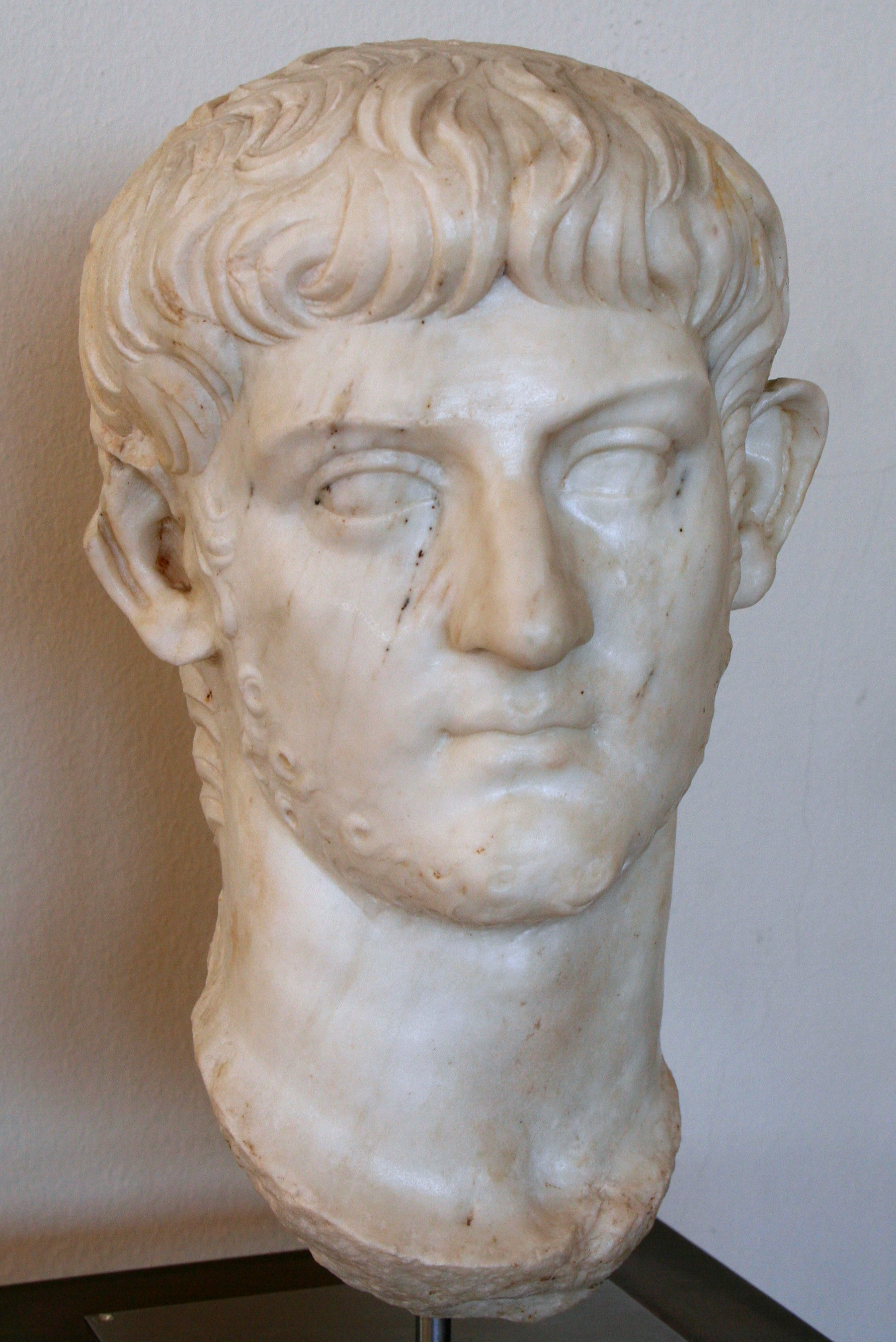
Nero Julius Caesar, Son of Germanicus

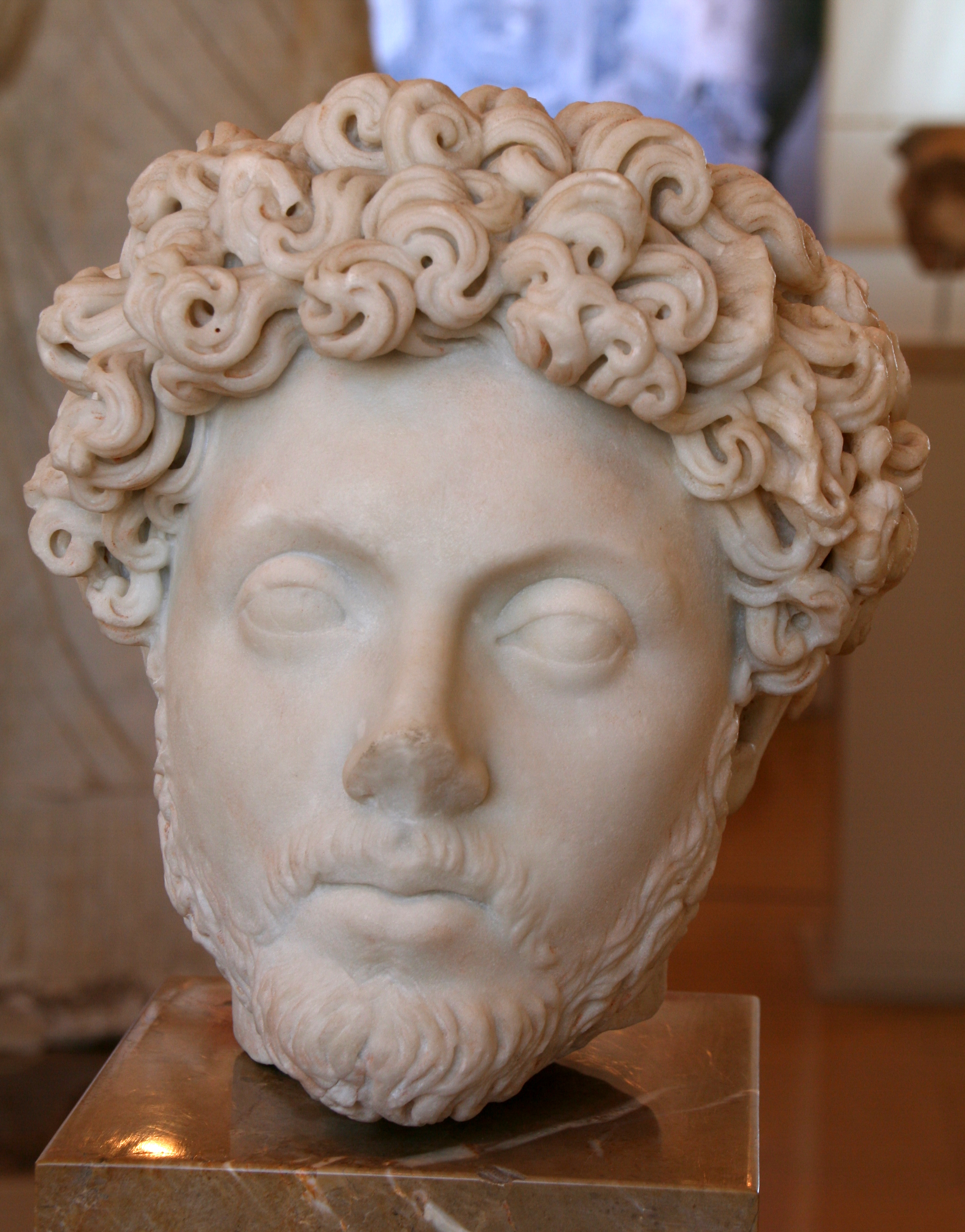
Portrait of Marcus Aurelius

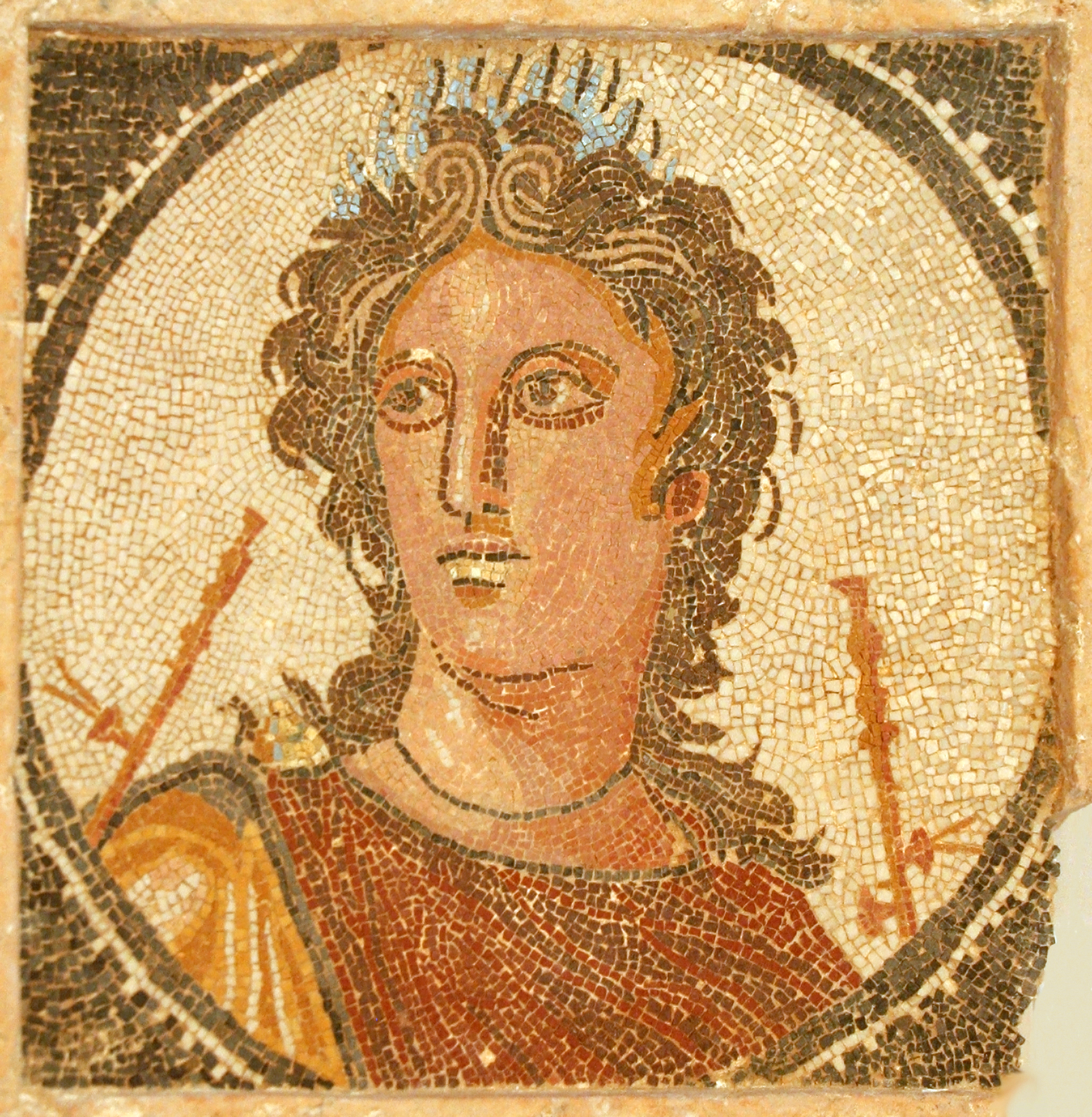
Euterpe

== See also ==
- Archaeology Museum of Catalonia
