= Frederick Ebenezer Baines =

Frederick Ebenezer Baines CB (10 November 1832 – 4 July 1911) was an English post office employee who was an early advocate of the post-office telegraph system, and wrote on the history of the post office.

== Life ==
Born on 10 November 1832 and baptised at Chipping Barnet, Hertfordshire, on 19 January 1834, he was younger son of Edward May Baines, surgeon, of Hendon and Chipping Barnet, by Fanny, his wife. Educated at private schools, he constructed and manipulated telegraphic apparatus by age 14, helped by his uncle Edward Cowper, and an elder brother, G. L. Baines. Two years later, through the influence of Frederick Hill, an uncle by marriage, and Rowland Hill, he obtained an appointment under the Electric Telegraph Company. He remained with the company for seven years, in charge for the first three years of a small office set up in 1848 within the buildings of the General Post Office.

In April 1855, on the nomination of Rowland Hill, Baines was made a clerk in the general correspondence branch of the General Post Office. He was transferred after a few months, on account of his knowledge of railways, to the home mails branch.

== Telegraph promoter ==
Baines planned the laying of a cable to the Canary Islands, across the South Atlantic to Barbados, and along the chain of West India islands; and he also proposed a cable to connect England with Australia by way of the Canary Islands, Ascension Island, St. Helena, and the Cape of Good Hope. In a letter to The Times (14 September 1858) he further advocated the connection of the Atlantic and Pacific coasts by a line across Canada.

His most important scheme, which Baines drew up in 1856, was for the government acquisition of existing telegraph systems. This proposal, with the permission of the Duke of Argyll, then postmaster-general, he forwarded to the Lords of the Treasury. After a long interval, in 1865 Frank Ives Scudamore, a post-office official, was instructed by Lord Stanley, then postmaster-general, to report on the advisability of post-office control of the telegraphic systems. In his report Scudamore acknowledged Baines's responsibility for the first practical suggestion. Control of existing telegraph systems was transferred to the Post Office on 5 February 1870. All the main features of Baines's original plan came into operation.

In 1875 Baines was made surveyor-general for telegraph business, and in 1878, with a view to decreasing the danger of invasion and increasing the efficiency of the coastguard service, he proposed the establishment of telegraphic communication around the sea-coast of the British Isles, to be worked by the coastguard under the control and supervision of the Post Office. The proposal, renewed in 1881 and again in 1888, was adopted by the government in 1892.

== Later life ==
In 1882 Baines was made inspector-general of mails and assistant secretary in the Post Office under Sir Arthur Blackwood. He organised the parcel post service, introduced by Henry Fawcett in 1883, extending the system subsequently to all British colonies and most European countries. Different views and systems of postal administration on the continent made his task difficult.

Baines became a Companion of the Bath (CB) in 1885 and retired through ill-health on 1 August 1893. He had lived for most of his life in Hampstead, had assisted in the acquisition of Parliament Hill Fields for public use, was a member of the Hampstead select vestry, and in 1890 edited Records of Hampstead. He was also a volunteer, serving both as a non-commissioned and commissioned officer.

Baines died on 4 July 1911 at Hampstead, and was cremated at Golders Green Crematorium.

== Works ==
Baines wrote Forty Years at the Post Office (2 vols. 1895), reminiscences with details of reforms in the Post Office. He also published On the Track of the Mail Coach (1896), and contributed an article on the post-office to James Samuelson's The Civilisation of Our Day (1896).

== Family ==
Baines married in 1887 Laura, eldest daughter of Walter Baily of Hampstead.

== Notes ==
Attribution

This article incorporates text from a publication now in the public domain: Lee, Sidney, ed. (1912). "Baines, Frederick Ebenezer". Dictionary of National Biography (2nd supplement). Vol. 1. London: Smith, Elder & Co.
