= William Maynard Gomm =

British field marshal (1784–1875)

Field Marshal Sir William Maynard Gomm GCB
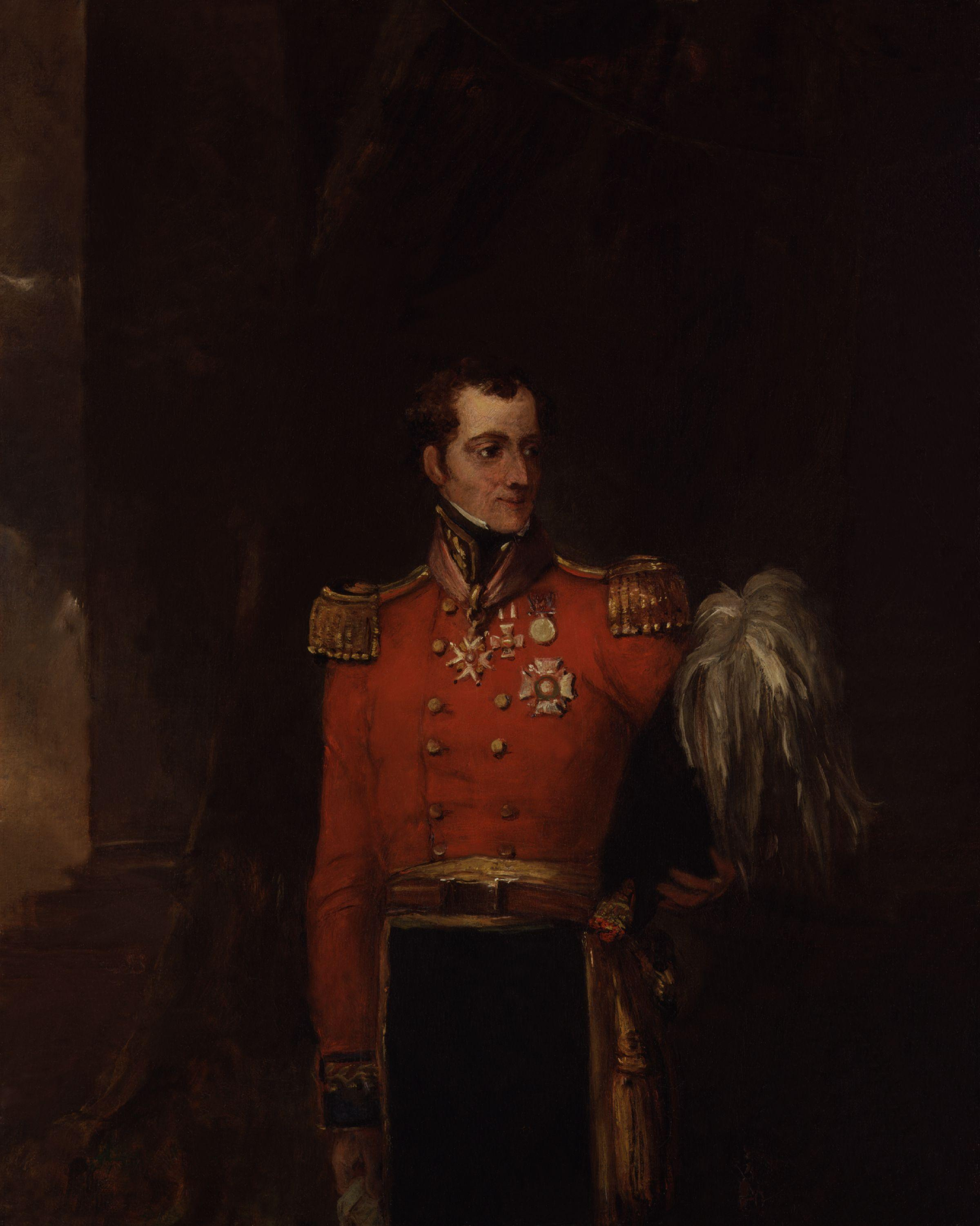
- Portrait by William Salter (oil on canvas, 1834–1840)
- Born: 10 November 1784; Barbados, West Indies
- Died: 15 March 1875 (aged 90); Brighton, Sussex
- Military career
- Allegiance: United Kingdom
- Branch: British Army
- Service years: 1799–1856
- Rank: Field Marshal
- Commands: Northern District; Commander-in-Chief, India
- Conflicts: French Revolutionary Wars; Napoleonic Wars
- Awards: Knight Grand Cross of the Order of the Bath
- Other work: Constable of the Tower

Field Marshal Sir William Maynard Gomm, GCB (10 November 1784 – 15 March 1875) was a British Army officer. After taking part in the Anglo-Russian invasion of Holland, he served in most of the battles of the Napoleonic Wars. During the Hundred Days he took part in both the Battle of Quatre Bras and the Battle of Waterloo. He went on to be Commander of the troops in Jamaica and in that role established new barracks at Newcastle, Jamaica, high in the mountains. After that he became Governor of Mauritius and, finally, Commander-in-Chief, India, in which role he introduced promotion examinations for officers.

== Military career ==
Born the son of Lieutenant-Colonel William Gomm (who served in the 46th Foot during the American Revolutionary War and was killed in the attack on Guadeloupe in April 1794) and Mary Alleyne Gomm (née Maynard), Gomm was commissioned as an ensign in the 9th Regiment of Foot on 24 May 1794, at the age of nine, in recognition of the services rendered by his father. Promoted to lieutenant on 14 April 1795, he continued his full-time education at a private school in Woolwich.

Gomm joined his regiment in 1799 and was deployed to the Netherlands where he fought under the Duke of York and Albany at the Battle of Bergen in September 1799 and at the Battle of Alkmaar in October 1799 during the Anglo-Russian invasion of Holland. He also took part in Sir James Pulteney's expedition to Ferrol in Spain in August 1800 and, having been promoted to captain on 19 July 1803, he joined the Senior Division of the new Royal Military College at High Wycombe. He then served as assistant quartermaster-general under Earl Cathcart at the Battle of Copenhagen in August 1807.

Gomm joined Sir Arthur Wellesley's army, again as assistant quartermaster-general, and fought at the Battle of Roliça and the Battle of Vimeiro in August 1808 during the Peninsular War. After the Convention of Sintra Gomm returned to Portugal and served on Sir John Moore's staff at the Battle of Corunna in January 1809. Gomm was also on the Earl of Chatham's staff during the disastrous Walcheren Campaign of Autumn 1809.

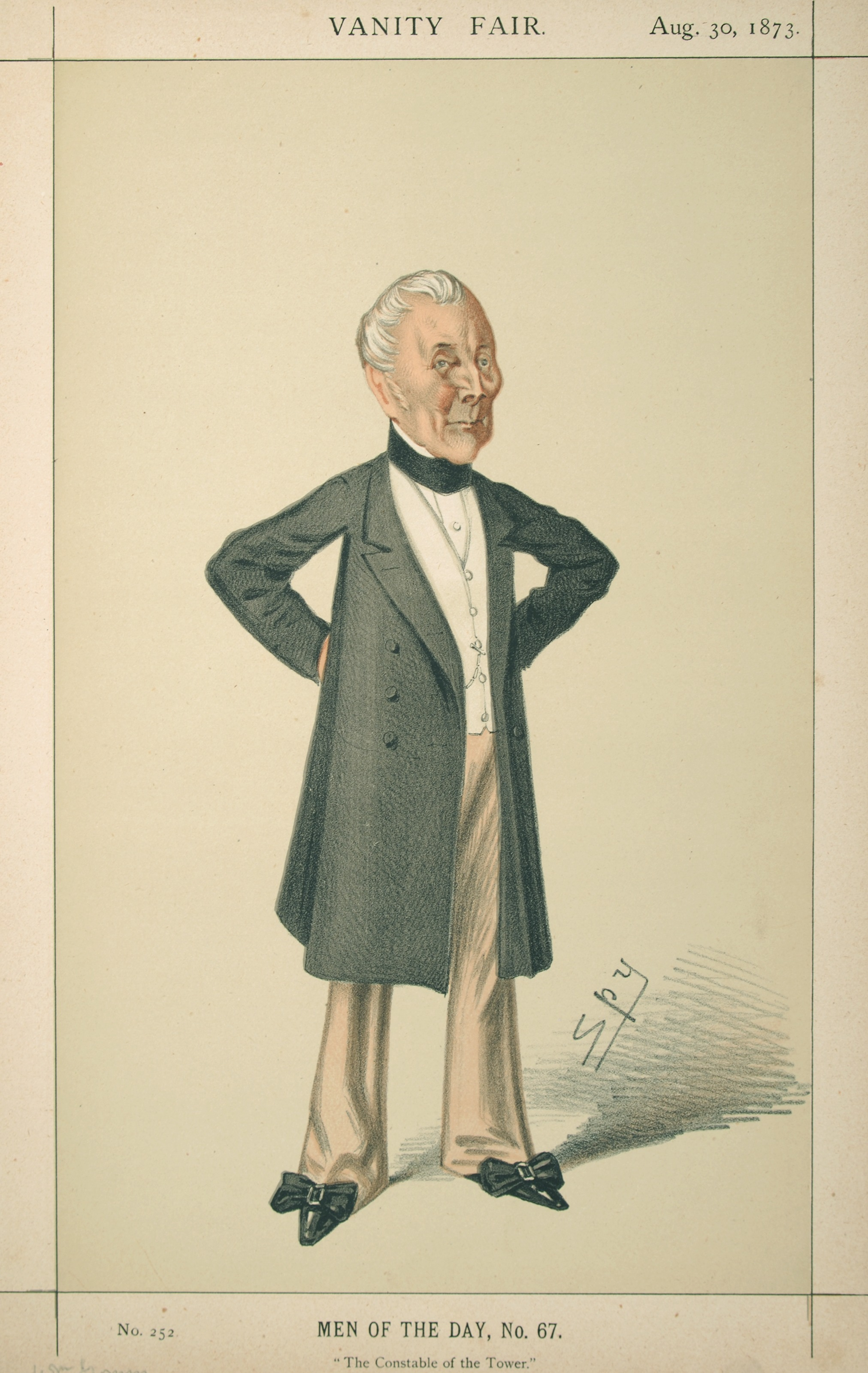
Caricature of William Maynard Gomm, Vanity Fair, 1873

Gomm returned to Portugal in March 1810 and, as a staff officer, took part in the Battle of Bussaco in September 1810 and the Battle of Fuentes de Oñoro in May 1811 before being promoted to major on 10 October 1811. He went on to fight at the Siege of Ciudad Rodrigo in January 1812, the Siege of Badajoz in April 1812 (where he was wounded) and the Battle of Salamanca in July 1812 before being promoted to lieutenant colonel on 17 August 1812. After that he took part in the Siege of Burgos in September 1812, the Battle of Vitoria in June 1813 and the Siege of San Sebastián in July 1813 as well as the Battle of Nivelle in November 1813 and the Battle of the Nive in December 1813 (where he was wounded again). Following his return to England, he transferred into the Coldstream Guards on 25 July 1814 and was appointed a Knight Commander of the Order of the Bath on 2 January 1815.

During the Hundred Days, as a staff officer with the 5th Division, Gomm took part in the Battle of Quatre Bras and the Battle of Waterloo in June 1815. At Waterloo he rode a charger called "George", which survived until 1841.

He was awarded the Russian Order of St. Anna, 2nd Class on 8 October 1815. He acquired a property at 6 Upper Grosvenor Street in London in 1826.

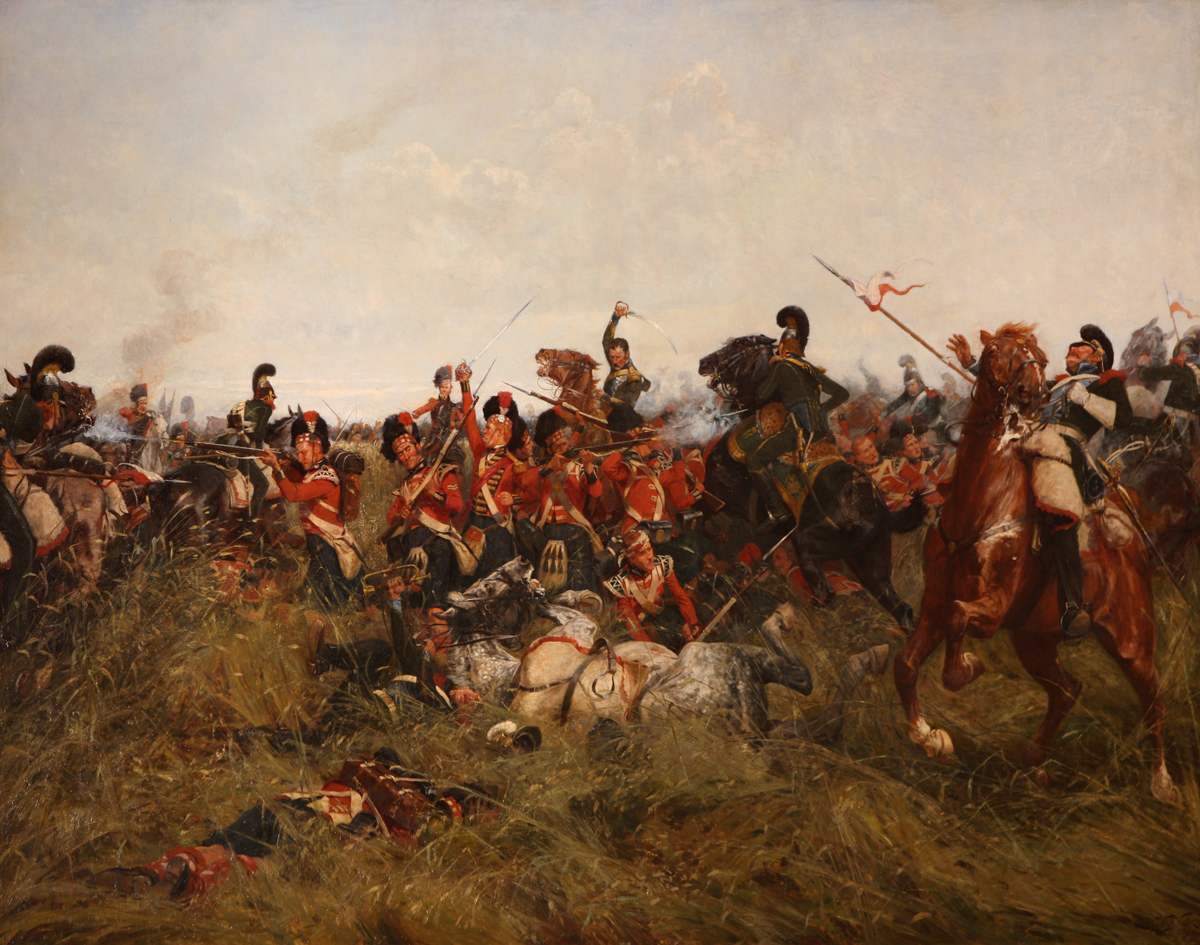
The Battle of Quatre Bras, at which Gomm served as a staff officer, during the Hundred Days

Gomm was promoted to colonel on 16 May 1829 and to major-general on 10 January 1837. He became Commander of the troops in Jamaica in 1839 and in that role observed that yellow fever, a major cause of death among the British troops stationed in Jamaica, was far less prevalent in the mountains and he therefore established new barracks at Newcastle, Jamaica, high in the mountains. He was awarded an honorary Doctor of Laws degree by Cambridge University in 1842.

Gomm was briefly General officer commanding Northern District in early 1842 before being appointed the Governor of Mauritius in June 1842. Promoted to lieutenant-general on 9 November 1846, he was sent out to India in Summer 1849 to become Commander-in-Chief, India arriving only to discover that his appointment had been cancelled in favour of Sir Charles Napier. Gomm was then initially chosen to become Commander-in-chief of the Bombay Army with the local rank of general in September 1850 but, following Napier's resignation as Commander-in-Chief, India, Gomm succeeded him in December 1851. In that role Gomm introduced promotion examinations for officers.

Promoted to full general on 20 June 1854, he retired from active service in 1856 and, after advancement to Knight Grand Cross of the Order of the Bath on 21 June 1859 and after further promotion to field marshal on 1 January 1868, he became Constable of the Tower in October 1872. He also served as honorary colonel of the 13th Regiment of Foot. He died at Brighton in Sussex on 15 March 1875 and was buried at Christ's Church in Rotherhithe. Under his widow's will £15,000 was left to Keble College, Oxford to endow scholarships in his memory.

== Family ==
In 1817 Gomm married Sophia Penn, great-granddaughter of William Penn; following the death of his first wife in 1827 he married Elizabeth Kerr, eldest daughter of Major-General Lord Robert Kerr, who was the son of William Kerr, 5th Marquess of Lothian, in 1830. He had no children by either marriage.

Lady Elizabeth died in 1877, leaving £5000 to the Sir William and Lady Gomm Charity to benefit elderly people in Rotherhithe. This endowed the Lady Elizabeth Memorial Mission Hall and Accident Hospital in Hawkstone Road next to Southwark Park. The former hospital building survives as Lady Gomm House.

== Sources ==
- Heathcote, Tony (1999). The British Field Marshals, 1736–1997: A Biographical Dictionary. Barnsley: Leo Cooper. ISBN 0-85052-696-5.

Military offices
Preceded by Sir Charles Napier	GOC Northern District; 1842	Succeeded by Sir Thomas Arbuthnot
Government offices
Preceded by Sir Lionel Smith	Governor of Mauritius; 1842–1849	Succeeded by Sir George William Anderson
Military offices
Preceded by Sir Robert Sale	Colonel of the 13th (1st Somersetshire) (Prince Albert's Light Infantry) Regiment of Foot; 1846–1863	Succeeded by Philip McPherson
Preceded by Sir Charles Napier	Commander-in-Chief, India; 1851–1856	Succeeded by George Anson
Preceded by The Lord Clyde	Colonel of the Coldstream Guards; 1863–1875	Succeeded by Sir William Codrington
Honorary titles
Preceded by Sir George Pollock	Constable of the Tower; Lord Lieutenant of the Tower Hamlets; 1872–1875	Succeeded by Sir Charles Yorke
