= Cecil Boyle =

English rugby union player

- Born: Cecil William Boyle; 16 March 1853 Westminster, London
- Died: 5 April 1900 (aged 47) near Boshof, Orange Free State

Rugby union career
- Position: Half-back
International career
Years	Team	Apps	(Points)
1873	England	1	(0)

Cecil William Boyle (16 March 1853 – 5 April 1900) was an English sportsman who played international rugby union for England and first-class cricket. He was killed in action during the Second Boer War.

Educated at Clifton College and University College, Oxford, Boyle played both cricket and rugby union for the University of Oxford. In 1873, he became the first ever Oxford player to be capped for the England national rugby union team, appearing in a Test against Scotland in Glasgow. He played five first-class cricket matches for Oxford University in the same year and once more in 1874. As a fast round-arm bowler, Boyle took 30 wickets during his short first-class career, at an average of 10.30. On his debut, against the Marylebone Cricket Club (MCC), he took 7/40 in the first innings. His match tally of nine wickets was bettered the next time Oxford University played the MCC, at Lord's, when he took 7/33 in the second innings after taking four in the first. A maternal uncle of Test cricketer Lionel Tennyson, Boyle also took a first-class hat-trick for Oxford University, against Middlesex.

Boyle was a captain in the Queen's Own Oxfordshire Hussars (Oxfordshire Yeomanry), when in February 1900 he was appointed a lieutenant in the Imperial Yeomanry for service in the Second Boer War. He took 30 of his own horses with him to South Africa, where he served with the 10th Battalion. In April 1900, he fought against French volunteers at Boshof and became the first member of the Imperial Yeomanry to be killed in action.
