= Richard Hugh Stotherd =

British Army officer (1828–1895)

Richard Hugh Stotherd CB (1828–1895) was a British Army officer, a major-general in the Royal Engineers and the director-general of the Ordnance Survey of the United Kingdom,

== Life ==
The son of General Richard J. Stotherd (1796–1879), colonel commandant Royal Engineers, by his first wife, Elizabeth Sydney (died 1853), daughter of Hugh Boyle, of Dungiven, County Londonderry, he was born at Angler Castle, County Tyrone, on 25 November 1828. His father, who came of a Lincolnshire family, worked on the Ordnance Survey of Ireland, and was promoted general 19 June 1872.

Educated at University College school, and at the Royal Military Academy, Woolwich, Stotherd received a commission as second lieutenant in the Royal Engineers on 2 May 1847, and first lieutenant on 28 October. He went through the usual course of professional study at Chatham, and then served at Woolwich and at Gibraltar. On his return home he was posted to the Ordnance Survey of Great Britain and sent to Dumfries. He was promoted to be second captain on 21 May 1855, and first captain on 17 May 1860.

Leaving the Ordnance Survey in 1861, Stotherd went to Weymouth, and then, at time of the Trent affair, to North America, where he acted as brigade major and assistant to the commanding Royal Engineer, serving four years in Canada and New Brunswick.

On Stotherd's return to England on 13 February 1866 he was appointed instructor in electricity, chemistry, and photography at the school of military engineering at Chatham. There he was an early investigator of the application of electricity to mining and naval mines, and he also organised the first field telegraph. He was sent to the 1867 Paris Exhibition to report on military telegraphs. In 1868 Prince Arthur was under his instruction. While at Chatham, Stotherd advocated Morse code for army signalling. He was promoted to be brevet major on 22 November 1870, regimental major on 5 July 1872, and regimental lieutenant-colonel on 3 August 1872.

In 1871 Stotherd accompanied Colonel Charles Cornwallis Chesney to report on the Franco-Prussian War, the siege of Paris and the operations against the Paris Commune. In April 1873 he was appointed to the War Office in London, to advise on the subject of submarine mines and of military telegraphs. He was from 1873 to 1876 president of the first war office torpedo committee. In 1876 Stotherd was appointed commanding Royal Engineer of the Belfast military district, where he remained for five years. He was promoted to be brevet colonel on 3 August 1877, and regimental colonel on 26 April 1882. In September 1881 he was appointed to the charge of the Ordnance Survey in Ireland, residing at the Mountjoy Barracks, Phoenix Park, Dublin. After the assassination of Lord Frederick Cavendish, Stotherd acted as a military justice of the peace for the city of Dublin, in charge of troops in aid of the civil power.

On 1 April 1883 Stotherd was appointed director-general of the Ordnance Survey of the United Kingdom, and went to its headquarters at Southampton. The staff had grown under his predecessor, Lieutenant-General Anthony Charles Cooke. A parliamentary select committee of 1878 had recommended that the original large-scale surveys should be completed in 1890, instead of 1900. Stotherd urged a systematic revision on the government. In 1884 he saw to maps for the Redistribution of Seats Bill, and was officially thanked by being made CB

On 25 November 1886 Stotherd was compelled by the age rule to retire from the army and from his appointment, receiving the honorary rank of major-general. He died suddenly, from heart disease, on 1 May 1895 at Camberley, Surrey, where he resided.

== Works ==
Stotherd contributed articles to The Professional Papers of the Corps of Royal Engineers, vols. xvii. and xviii., and was the author of the first text-book published in England on its subject, Notes on Defence by Submarine Mines, Brompton, Kent; the second edition was dated 1873.

== Family ==
Stotherd was first married on 11 June 1861, at St. George's, Hanover Square, London, to Caroline Frances Wood (died 17 February 1872), by whom he had a large family; and secondly, on 29 September 1875, at Edinburgh, Elizabeth Janet Melville, who survived him.
His eldest son Major Sydney Boyle Stotherd (1862-19/10/1915) died of wounds in France
Another son Lt. Col. Edward A W Stotherd b:c. 1864 in Canada also fought in WW1. He died aged 75 in 1939

Lynette Saunders (Fallon) born Walton hospital England on 8 December 1966 is 3rd great granddaughter and resides in Australia with her children Emma, Daniel, Joshuah Parr and husband Tank commander Lcpl Paul Saunders of 1st Armoured regiment.

== Notes ==
Attribution

This article incorporates text from a publication now in the public domain: Lee, Sidney, ed. (1898). "Stotherd, Richard Hugh". Dictionary of National Biography. Vol. 54. London: Smith, Elder & Co.
