= Charles Fyshe Roberts =

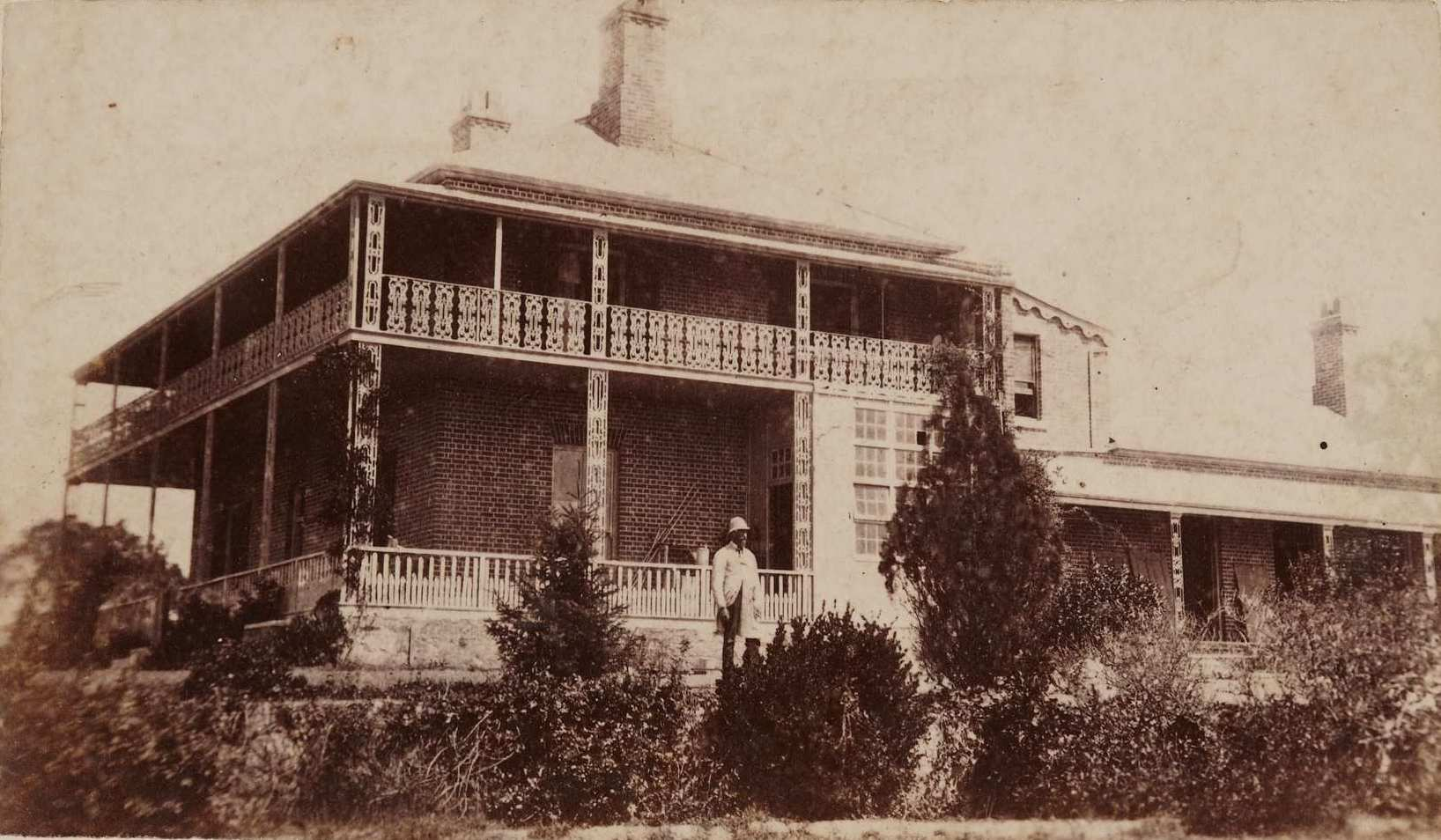
South Hill, Goulburn, around 1875

Colonel Charles Fyshe Roberts, CMG (20 August 1837 – 9 September 1914) was Under-Secretary of Defence in colonial New South Wales.

== Early life ==
Roberts was the son of Captain Charles Roberts, of the 59th Regiment, was born in Ickwell, Bedfordshire, England, and educated Bedford School, between 1845 and 1854, at Carshalton Military School, and at the Royal Military Academy, Woolwich. He entered the Royal Artillery in 1855, became captain in 1862 and major in 1863. He served in the Crimean War in 1855–56, during which he was twice wounded, and received a medal with clasp, the Turkish medal, and the Sardinian Medal of Military Valor, and was personally commended for his conduct on 18 June 1855 by Lord Raglan. He was in command of the artillery with the field force in Sikkim, in 1861, for which he was thanked in general orders, and by the Governor-General of India in Council, and was made captain and subsequently brevet-major.

== Career in Australia ==
Roberts was aide-de-camp to Sir John Young, when Young was Governor of New South Wales, from 1866 to 1867. Colonel Roberts retired from the Royal Artillery in 1871, and was secretary to the Agent-General for New South Wales in London from 1872 to 1874, after which he returned to New South Wales.

In 1866 Roberts had married Alice, daughter of the late William Bradley, of Goulburn and on the family's return to Sydney, he bought South Hill, a property near Goulburn. In January 1876, a daughter, Beatrice was born there. The property was sold in November 1876. In the same year Roberts was appointed colonel in command of the New South Wales artillery, and second in command of the forces.

When Colonel John Soame Richardson led the Sudan Contingent in March 1885, Roberts assumed command of all New South Wales military forces. In June 1885 he was created Companion of the Order of St Michael and St George.

From 1887 to 1888 Roberts argued with Richardson over his treatment, when command of the artillery was changed to come under the general staff.

In 1890 Roberts visited England, and was commissioned by the New South Wales Government to inquire into all military matters likely to be suggestive of improvements in the colonial forces. In 1892, when it was decided to establish a separate department of defence under the Colonial Secretary, Colonel Roberts was appointed the first Under-Secretary.

== Death ==
Roberts died in Double Bay, Sydney, Australia, on 9 September 1914. Roberts was an honorary aide-de-camp to the King, his military funeral was held on 11 September 1914 and he was buried in South Head Cemetery. He was survived by his wife, a son and four daughters.
