= Hibbert (surname) =

Hibbert is a surname, and may refer to:

== A ==
- Alex Hibbert (born 1986), English polar expedition leader, motivational speaker, author and photographer
- Alex R. Hibbert (born 2004), American actor
- Alice Hibbert-Ware (1869–1944), New Zealand-born naturalist and educator
- Andrew Hibbert (born 1974), English cricketer

== B ==
- Billy Hibbert (1884–1949), English professional footballer
- Brian Hibbert (born 1947), British engineer

== C ==
- Carlton Hibbert, English drummer
- Chris Hibbert (born 1976), South African field hockey player
- Christopher Hibbert (1924–2008), English writer, historian and biographer
- Curtis Hibbert (born 1966), Canadian stuntman and former gymnast

== D ==
- Dale Hibbert, English musician (bassist)
- Danny Hibbert (born 1948), Australian rules footballer
- Dave Hibbert (American football) (1938–2009), American football player
- David Hibbert (born 1986), English football striker
- Dee Hibbert-Jones, film director, producer and animator

== E ==
- Edward Hibbert (born 1955), American actor
- Eleanor Hibbert (1906–1993), British novelist

== F ==
- Fernand Hibbert (1873–1928), Haitian novelist

== G ==
- Gary Hibbert (born 1963), English cyclist
- Geoffrey Hibbert (1922–1969), British actor
- George Hibbert (1757–1837), English merchant and politician
- Guy Hibbert (born 1950), British screenwriter

== H ==
- Sir Henry Hibbert (1850–1927), British Conservative politician
- Hugh Hibbert (1911–1985), English cricketer
- Hugh Hibbert (British Army officer) (1893–1988), British Army officer

== J ==
- Jack Hibbert (footballer) (1870–1941), English professional footballer
- Sir Jack Hibbert (1932–2005), British statistician
- James Hibbert (1831–1903), English architect
- Jayden Hibbert (born 2004), American soccer player
- Jaydon Hibbert (born 2005), Jamaican track and field athlete
- Jimmy Hibbert (born 1949), British screenwriter and actor
- J. T. Hibbert (1824–1908), British politician
- John Hibbert (cricketer) (1853–1929), English cricketer and banker.
- John Wayne Hibbert, English professional boxer
- Joseph Hibbert (1894–1986), Jamaican Rastafari elder
- Joseph Hibbert (Jamaican politician) (died 2013)
- Joshua Ward-Hibbert (born 1994), British basketball player
- Julius Hibbert, fictional character in The Simpsons

== K ==
- Katrina Hibbert (born 1977), Australian basketball player and coach
- Keith Hibbert (born 1980), Jamaican cricketer

== L ==
- Lennie Hibbert (1928–1984), Jamaican musician
- Lloyd Hibbert (born 1959), English professional boxer
- Lucien Hibbert (1899–1964), Haitian public servant and mathematician

== N ==
- Nicole Hibbert (born 1994), British artistic gymnast

== O ==
- Ossie Hibbert (born c.1950), Jamaican organist, keyboard player and record producer

== P ==
- Paul Hibbert (1952–2008), Australian cricketer

== R ==
- Sir Reginald Hibbert (1922–2002), British diplomat
- Robert Hibbert (1717-1784), (1717–1784), West Indian merchant and Mancunian cotton manufacturer
- Robert Hibbert (Anti-Trinitarian) (1769–1849), Jamaican merchant and financier, established the Hibbert Lectures
- Robert Hibbert (cricketer) (1812–1833), English cricketer
- Robert Hibbert (merchant) (1750–1835), English merchant in Kingston, Jamaica
- Ron Hibbert (1924–1996), Australian rules footballer
- Roy Hibbert (born 1986), Jamaican-American professional basketball player

== S ==
- Samuel Hibbert-Ware (1782–1848), English geologist and antiquarian
- Stephen Hibbert (1957–2026), British-American actor and television writer
- Susan Hibbert (1924–2009), British Women's Auxiliary Territorial Service non-commissioned officer

== T ==
- Talia Hibbert (born c.1995), British romance novelist
- Thomas Hibbert (1710–1780), slave owner and merchant in Jamaica
- Tom Hibbert (1952–2011), English music journalist and film critic
- Tony Hibbert (British Army officer) (1917–2014), British soldier and gardener
- Tony Hibbert (musician) (born 1956), English bass guitarist
- Tony Hibbert (born 1981), English football defender
- Toots Hibbert (1945–2020), Jamaican reggae singer and songwriter
- Tucker Hibbert (born 1984), American snowmobile racer

== W ==
- William Hibbert (cricketer) (1873–1934), English cricketer
- William Hibbert (planter) (1759–1844), English planter, slave trader and merchant, son of Robert Hibbert (1717–1784)
- William Nembhard Hibbert, legal theorist

== See also ==
- Hibbert (given name)
- Hilbert (surname)
