= Hibbert =

Hibbert may refer to:

- Hibbert (given name)
- Hibbert (surname)
- Hibbert (ship), several ships
- Hibbert Township, township within West Perth, Ontario

== See also ==
- Hibbert House, building in Kingston, Jamaica
- Hibbert Rock, drying rock in Antarctica
- Hibbert Trust, foundation associated with British Unitarianism
  - The Hibbert Journal, defunct magazine issued by the Hibbert Trust
  - Hibbert Lectures, annual series of non-sectarian lectures on theological issues, sponsored by the Hibbert Trust
