= Robert Hibbert =

Robert Hibbert may refer to:

- Robert Hibbert (1717–1784), West Indies merchant and cotton manufacturer
- Robert Hibbert (Anti-Trinitarian) (1770–1849), his nephew, founder of the Hibbert Trust
- Robert Hibbert (cricketer) (1812–1833), English cricketer
- Robert Hibbert (merchant) (1750–1835), English merchant in Kingston, Jamaica
