= Hilbert (disambiguation) =

David Hilbert (1862–1943) was a German mathematician.

Hilbert may also refer to:

== Places ==
- 12022 Hilbert, an asteroid
- Hilbert (crater), on the Moon
- Hilbert, West Virginia, an unincorporated community
- Hilbert, Western Australia, a suburb
- Hilbert, Wisconsin, a village
- Hilbert Wildlife Management Area, West Virginia

== Other uses ==
- Hilbert (name), listing people with Hilbert as a given or family name
- USS Hilbert (DE-742), a US Navy destroyer escort of World War II
- Hilbert College, Hamburg, New York
- Hilbert High School, Hilbert, Wisconsin

== See also ==
- Hibbert
