= Robert Hibbert (Anti-Trinitarian) =

Robert Hibbert (25 October 1769 – 23 September 1849) was the founder of the Hibbert Trust.

== Biography ==
The third and posthumous son of John Hibbert (1732–1769), a Jamaica merchant, and Janet, daughter of Samuel Gordon, he was born in Jamaica; hence he spoke of himself as a Creole. His mother died early.

Between 1784 and 1788, he was a pupil of Gilbert Wakefield at Nottingham. He entered Emmanuel College, Cambridge, in 1788, and graduated B.A. in 1791. At Cambridge he formed a lifelong friendship with William Frend, the social reformer.

At a later period (1800–01), when Wakefield was imprisoned in Dorchester for writing a political pamphlet, Hibbert, though not wealthy then, sent him £1,000.

In 1791, Hibbert went to Kingston, Jamaica, as partner in a mercantile house (a trading partnership, Hibbert, Purrier and Horton) founded by his cousin Thomas (not to be confused with his father's eldest brother, Thomas Hibbert). Another cousin, George Hibbert, son of another Robert Hibbert (1717-1784) was one of the principals of the West India Dock Company which instigated the construction of the docks of that name on London's Isle of Dogs.

Returning to England in about 1803, he bought the estate of East Hide (now called Hyde), near Luton, Bedfordshire.

In Jamaica, he had acquired considerable property (in 1791 he purchased two sugar plantations, Georgia and Dundee, both in Hanover Parish) and he was not convinced by the arguments of Frend that his ownership of slaves was immoral. Besides plans for their material benefit, he sent out as a missionary to the slaves on his estates, in October 1817, Thomas Cooper (died 25 October 1880, aged 88). Cooper, a Unitarian minister recommended by Frend, remained on the island until 1821, endeavouring, with little success, to improve their moral and religious condition. A somewhat acrimonious controversy followed the publication of Cooper's 1823 report, Negro slavery, or, A view of some of the more prominent features of that state of society :as it exists in the United States of America and in the colonies of the West Indies, especially in Jamaica.

After 1825, Hibbert's Jamaica property declined in value and in about 1836 he sold it at considerable loss. He had previously (1833) sold his Bedfordshire estate and moved to London. He died at Welbeck Street, London, on 23 September 1849, and was buried in Kensal Green Cemetery. While in Jamaica, he married Elizabeth Jane, daughter of John Nembhard, M.D., who died on 15 February 1853.

=== Hibbert Trust ===
On 19 July 1847, Hibbert executed a deed conveying to trustees $50,000 in 6% Ohio stock, and £8,000 in railway shares. The trustees, on the death of his widow, were to apply the income 'in such manner as they shall from time to time deem most conducive to the spread of Christianity in its most simple and intelligible form, and to the unfettered exercise of the right of private judgment in matters of religion'. The trustees were always to be laymen. Appended was a scheme for the administration of the trust, which the trustees were empowered to revise, and were directed to revise at least once in every twenty-five years.

In the original scheme the trust was called 'the Anti-trinitarian Fund', and its object was, by a provision of divinity scholarships, to encourage learning and culture among unorthodox Christians. The breadth of the actual trust is largely due to the counsels of Hibbert's solicitor, Edwin Wilkins Field, but, in opposition to Field, Hibbert 'determined on insisting that all recipients should be hetero-dox', his intention being 'to elevate the position and the public influence of the unitarian ministry'.

In addition to scholarships and fellowships, the number and conditions of which are settled by the trustees from year to year, the trust, from the revision of 1878 until 1887, maintained an annual Hibbert Lecture, the first series being delivered by Professor Max Muller in 1878; between 1902 and 1968 it issued The Hibbert Journal, a quarterly magazine.

== Works ==
- Facts Verified upon Oath, in contradiction of the Report of the Rev. T. Cooper, &c., 1824, 8vo.
- A political paper, "Why am I a Liberal?" (about 1831) signed 'John Smith', reprinted in Murch's Memoir
- A newspaper address "To the Chartists of England", 1840, advocating the abolition of the Corn Laws and the adoption of the ballot.

== Bibliography ==
- Monthly Repository, 1822, pp. 217 sq.
- Christian Reformer, 1853, pp. 246 sq.
- Murch's Memoir of Hibbert, with a Sketch of the history of the Trust, 1874.
