= Chalfont Park =

Coordinates: 51.595665°N 0.545517°W

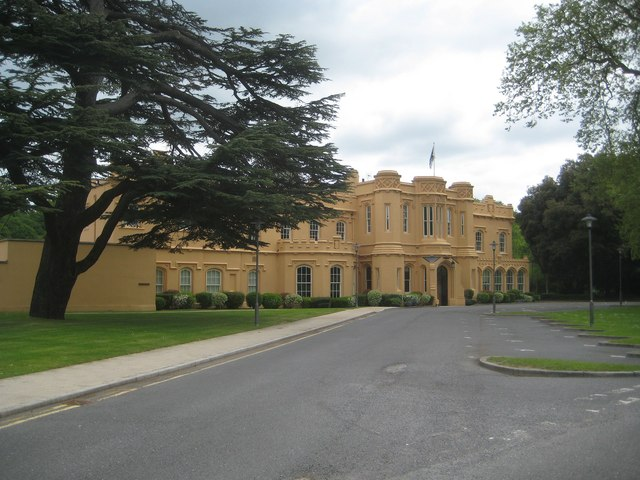
- Interactive map of the Chalfont Park area
- Former names: Brudenells, Bulstrodes

General information
- Type: Country house
- Architectural style: Strawberry Hill Gothic
- Location: Chalfont St Peter, Buckinghamshire, United Kingdom

Chalfont Park, formerly known as Brudenells and Bulstrodes, is an English country house and estate near the village of Chalfont St Peter in Buckinghamshire.

== History ==
=== First house ===
Chalfont Park developed from an area of land the size of two carucates acquired by Ranulph Brito, Treasurer of the Wardrobe, in March 1229 from Arnold de Turville in exchange for discharging his debt to Jews. Ranulph enfeoffed Andrew le Goys with the manor, and came into the possession of William Goys by 1302, and was owned by John Goys in 1316. In 1320, John Goys conveyed the manor to Geoffrey Bulstrode, from whom the manor acquired its name. Adam Bulstrode, likely Geoffrey's son, was in possession of the manor before 1346 and a Geoffrey Bulstrode held the manor in 1361. In the early 15th century, the manor was inherited by Agnes, daughter of Robert or Richard Bulstrode and wife of William Brudenell, who bequeathed the manor to her son Edmund, and the manor was henceforth known as Brudenells. Upon Edmund's death in 1469, his son Drew inherited the manor, and was inherited by Drew's son Edmund on his death in 1490.

Elizabeth, daughter of Edmund Brudenell and wife of Sir Robert Drury, inherited Brudenells from her father on his death in 1538. Brudenells was inherited by their son Robert who bequeathed the manor to his son Sir Henry on his death in 1592. Sir Henry mortgaged the manor in 1607, and was sold by his son William Drury to Henry Bulstrode in 1626. At this time Brudenells was leased to Thomas Baldwin for £150 pa, and was inherited by Henry's son Thomas who sold the manor to Sir Thomas Allen in 1645, and was in the possession of Frances Allen in 1651. Brudenells came into the possession of Dudley Rowse by 1657, but owed large debts to the crown and was thus seized after his death in 1678 and granted to George Jeffreys, 1st Baron Jeffreys in 1688. However, the house is recorded to have been in the possession of Edward Penn in the same year. In 1714, Brudenells was purchased by John Wilkins, and was mortgaged to Lister Seman by 1736.

=== Second house ===
The trustees of Charles Churchill bought the estate from Lister Seman in 1755 for his son Charles Churchill for £7600. The stable yard gateway was designed by Richard Bentley and constructed in 1755, and the house was rebuilt in Strawberry Hill Gothic in 1760 to designs by John Chute. Lancelot Brown was commissioned for a visit and a survey of the estate in 1763 for £35, which was possibly carried out by Nathaniel Richmond. Thomas Hibbert, son of Robert Hibbert, bought the estate in 1794, and employed Humphry Repton who added a boathouse and icehouse, and widened the River Misbourne to form a lake. James Main was employed as head gardener in 1795, and Thomas Girtin was invited to the estate in 1796 and painted several views of the house and lake, and Chalfont Lodge. Hibbert extended the estate in 1799 with the purchase of 31 acres and 152 acres to the north alongside Hogtrough Wood.

Between 1799 and 1800, John Nash was employed to enlarge the house and added a clock tower. J. M. W. Turner also visited the estate and painted two watercolours of the house in 1800. Thomas died childless in 1819 and Chalfont Park was inherited by his brother Robert who bequeathed the estate to his son John Nembhard Hibbert on his death in 1835. In 1836, Anthony Salvin was employed to lay out a cricket pitch, and remodel the house by adding heraldic emblems and gargoyles and filling in the front arcades. John Nembhard Hibbert's executors sold Chalfont Park to Captain Berton after his death in 1886, and parts of the estate was sold separately to form the town of Gerrards Cross. Berton had a cricket pitch laid out to the north of the house in 1887. The house was advertised for sale in June 1888, but was not sold. An ancient coin found at the park in 1889 is considered one of the earliest forgeries in Britain. Berton possessed the estate until its sale to John Bathurst Akroyd in 1899, who put the estate up for sale in 1905 and was bought by Edward Mackay Edgar in 1910.

Edwin Lutyens was employed by Edgar's wife in 1913 to design an Italianate sunken garden to the northwest of the house with arbour, alcoves and a wishing well at one end and an orangery at the other end, and Gertrude Jekyll may have collaborated with Lutyens on the design of the gardens. The house served as an auxiliary hospital during the First World War, and after the war the stables were converted into a commercial garage. The house became a hotel in 1921, and a golf course was created in the north park. The golf course was officially opened in spring 1922 with an exhibition match between George Duncan and Harry Vardon. In 1930, Chalfont Lodge became a girls' school. Chalfont Park House was later used as a training centre by the National Provincial Bank, and during the Second World War the house was used as a home for recovering servicemen. In 1944, the remaining estate and house was purchased by British Aluminium Company. Chalfont Lodge became a training centre after the Second World War, and the Lutyens gardens were replaced by research laboratories in the 1950s.

The orangery became an accelerated test facility for painted and anodised aluminium whilst the squash courts were converted to workshops. Members of the canoe club of British Aluminium Company formed the Chalfont Park Canoe Club in 1952. The 1965 film Thunderball was partly filmed at Chalfont Park House. The lake was dredged and the west side landscaped in 1985. In the late 20th century, Chalfont Lodge was destroyed and a care home was constructed in its place. Alcan Chemicals Ltd, the successor of British Aluminium Company, vacated the estate in July 1999, and the research laboratories were subsequently redeveloped into a business park in 2000/2001. Since 2008, the gardener's cottage, lodge, and pavilion have been owned by Buttercups Nursery Limited and used as a nursery. As of 2015, Chalfont Park House is leased by Citrix Systems, and the kitchen garden has been replaced by a car park.

== Gallery ==
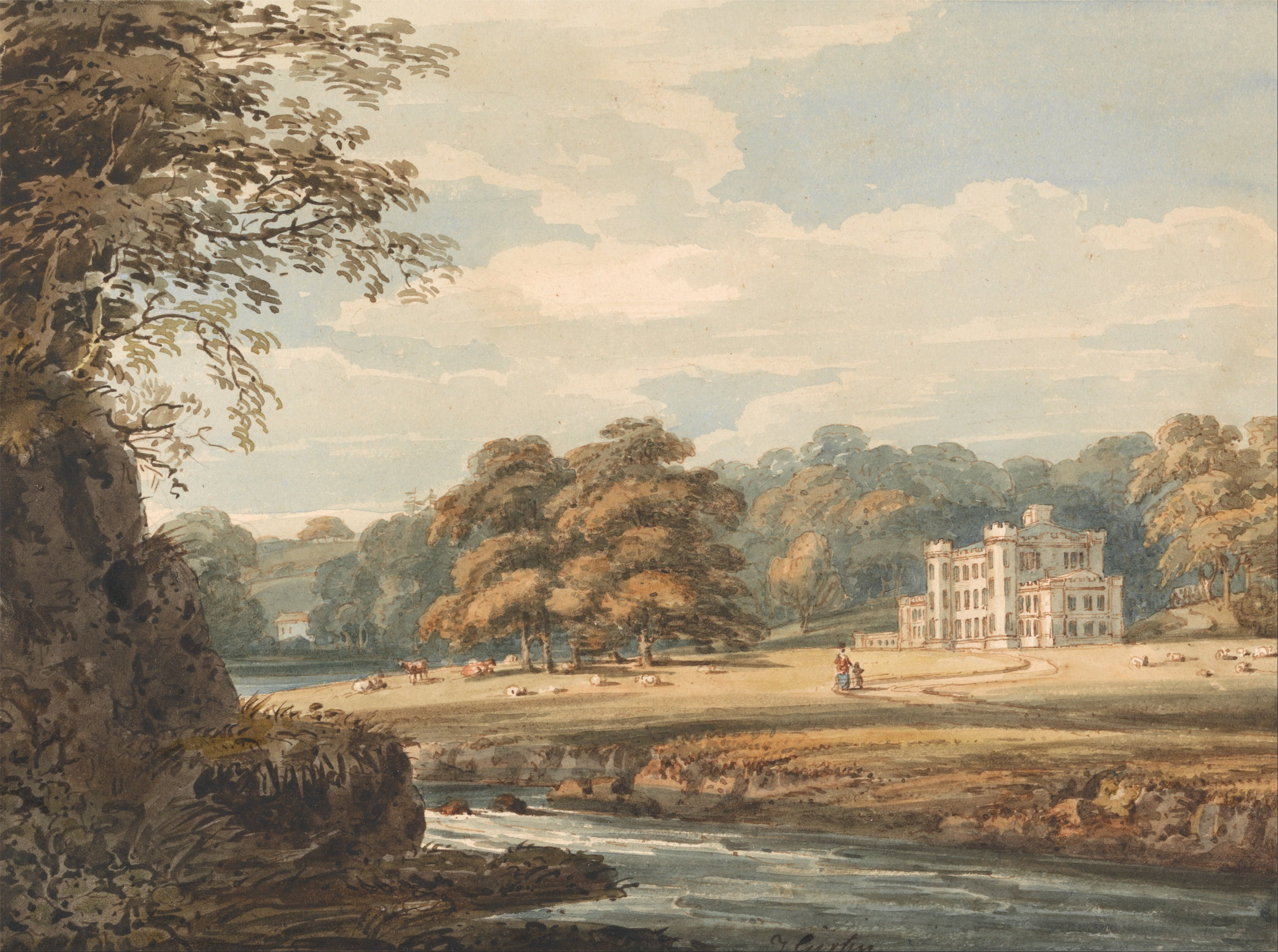
Thomas Girtin's watercolour of the house in 1796

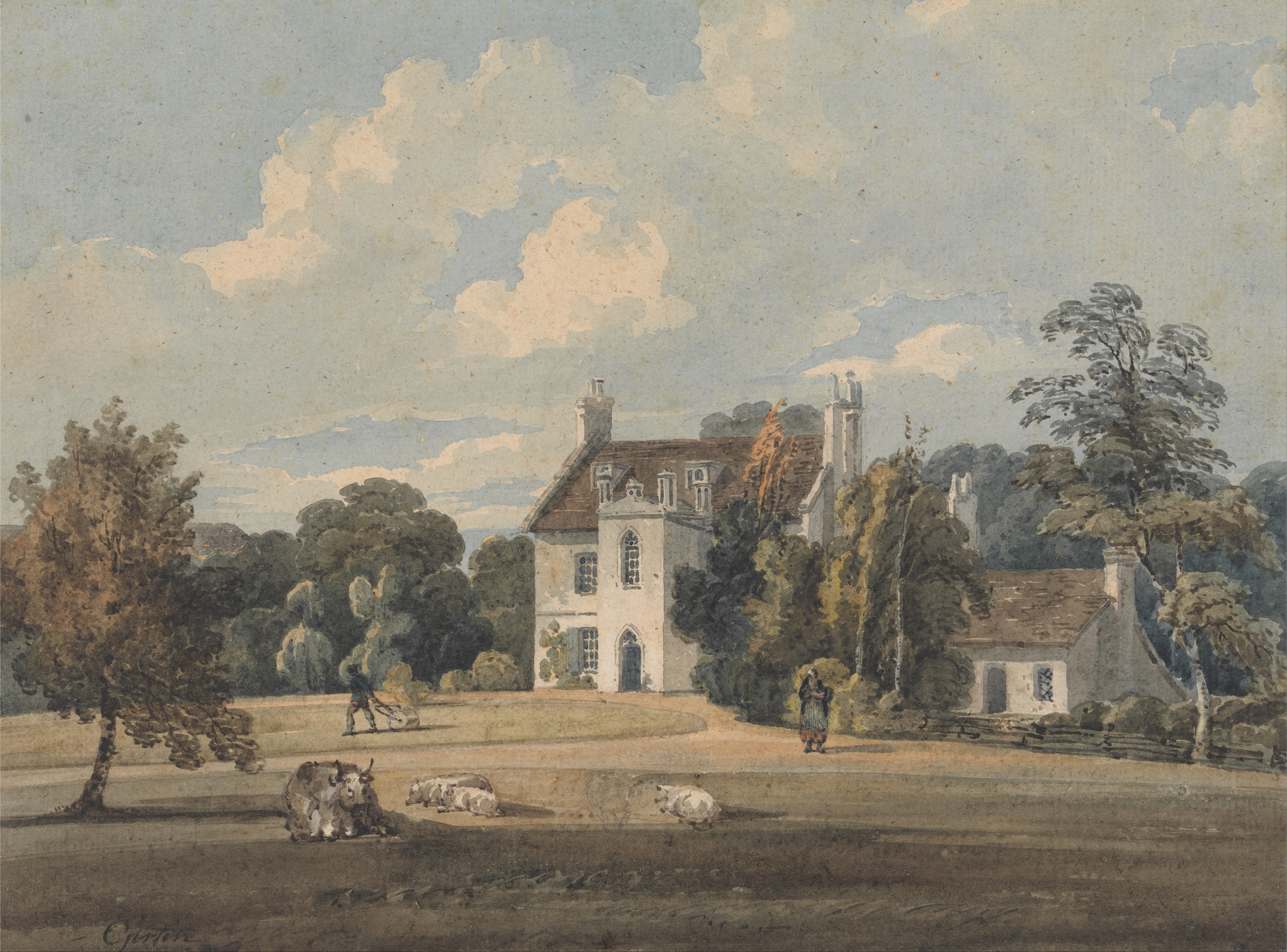
Thomas Girtin's watercolour of the lodge

== Bibliography ==
- Edmonds, G. C.; Baker, Audrey (2003). A History of Chalfont St Peter and Gerrards Cross, and A History of Bulstrode. Colin Smythe Limited.
- Elvey, Elizabeth M. (1961). "The Abbot of Missenden's Estates in Chalfont St. Peter" (PDF). Records of Buckinghamshire. 17 (Pt. 1).
- Hall, Catherine; McClelland, Keith; Draper, Nick; Donington, Kate; Lang, Rachel (2014). Legacies of British Slave-Ownership: Colonial Slavery and the Formation of Victorian Britain. Cambridge University Press.
- Head, J.F. (2014). Early Man in South Buckinghamshire: An Introduction to the Archaeology of the Region. Butterworth-Heinemann.
- Page, William (1925). "Parishes: Chalfont St. Peter". A History of the County of Buckingham, vol. 3. Victoria County History.
