= William Hibbert =

William Hibbert may refer to:

- William Hibbert (cricketer) (1873–1934), English cricketer
- William Hibbert (planter) (1759–1844), English planter, slave trader and merchant, son of Robert Hibbert (1717–1784)
- Billy Hibbert (1884–1949), English footballer
