= Hibberts (1784 ship) =

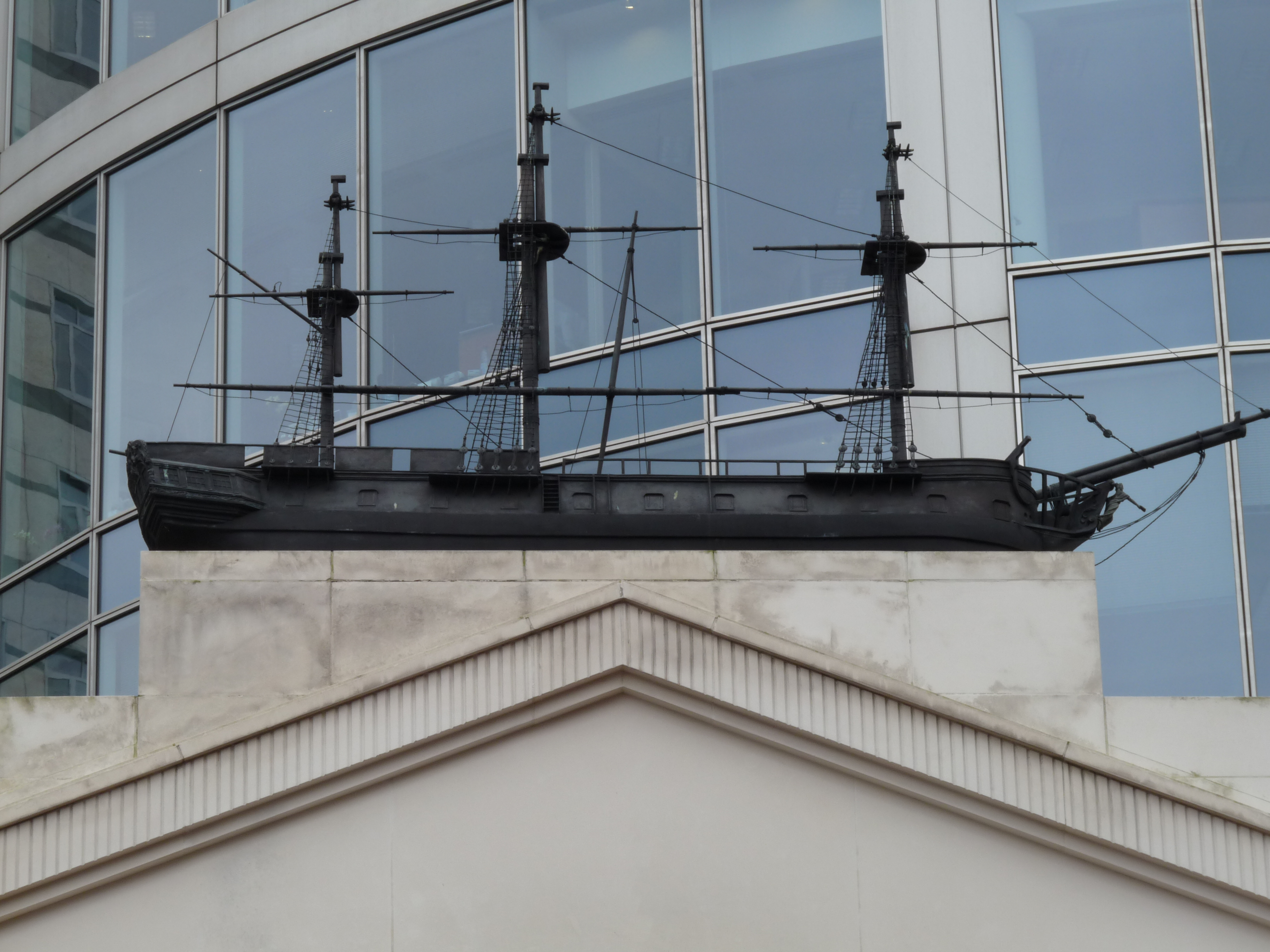
- Model of Hibberts – West India Quay Import Dock

History

United Kingdom
- Name: Hibberts
- Namesake: George Hibbert
- Launched: 1784, Thames
- Captured: Early 1811

General characteristics
- Tons burthen: 350, or 405 (bm)
- Complement: 30
- Armament: 1795: 6 × 4-pounder guns; 1798: 4 × 6-pounder + 2 × 4-pounder guns; 1800: 20 × 6&9&18-pounder cannons; 1801: 8 × 9-pounder + 10 × 6-pounder guns + 2 × 18-pounder carronades; 1807: 4 × 6-pounder guns + 6 × 1-pounder guns "of the New Construction"

Hibberts (or Hibbert), was launched in 1784 on the Thames as a West Indiaman. The first two times that French forces captured her the Royal Navy recaptured her. The second of these incidents, in 1804, gave rise to three court cases – an appeal to the Vice admiralty court at Halifax, Nova Scotia, a maritime insurance case that reached the United States Supreme Court, and one case in London dealing with the labor contracts covering seamen. Between these two captures and recaptures, in 1802–1803, Hibberts served briefly as an armed merchant ship under the command of a Royal Navy officer. The French captured her for the third and final time in 1811. Hibberts was the model for the sculpture that adorned the western gate of the West India Docks, giving it the name "Hibbert Gate".

== Career ==
Hibberts first appeared in Lloyd's Register (LR) in 1784, with Jn. Boyd, master, Hibberts & Co., owners, and trade London–Jamaica.

Year	Master	Owner	Trade	Source & notes
1795	Chisholm	Hibbert	London–Jamaica	LR; good repair 1792

In September 1795 a French squadron captured Hibberts, Chisholm, master, as she was sailing from Jamaica to London, but HMS Santa Margarita recaptured her. As Hibberts was returning to England, she ran aground at Scattery Island, Limerick 52°36′N 9°36′W; she was gotten off and returned to London.

Year	Master	Owner	Trade	Source & notes
1798	Chisholm; Butcher	Hibbert	London–Jamaica; London–Hamburg	LR; damages & good repair 1792, damages & thorough thorough repair 1798, & damages repaired 1798

On 12 July 1800, Captain John Frederick Butcher acquired a letter of marque.

Two sources suggest that Hibberts might have engaged in whaling in 1802, but have no further supporting evidence. At the time she was valued at £7,500.

Instead, in 1802, Hibberts served as an armed ship for the Royal Navy, with a naval officer in command. She and several other transports arrived at Plymouth to take on board the 29th Regiment of Foot. On 26 July, the "Hibberts armed ship", under the command of Lieutenant Donovan, left Plymouth Sound for Halifax, Nova Scotia. (Note: Armed transports were usually commanded by a superannuated lieutenant and escorted groups of other merchant vessels, as in this case, or sailed independently.)

Year	Master	Owner	Trade	Source & notes
1801	J.Butcher	J.Hurry & Co.	London–Jamaica	LR; damages & good repair 1792, damages & thorough thorough repair 1796, & damages repaired 1798

In 1804, the French privateer Restant captured Hibberts as she was returning from Honduras with a cargo of mahogany and took her into Havana. (Note: Restant was a privateer commissioned in Saint-Domingue, operating from February to July 1804.) In Havana a local court condemned her in prize. A merchant took possession and sailed her for New York. He insured her cargo with a United States insurance company.

As Hibberts was sailing from Havana to New York, HMS Leander recaptured her. This incident gave rise to a case in the Vice admiralty court in Halifax, which restored her to her British owners. A summary of the case stated:

A court of prize in a neutral country has not authority to deliver a vessel upon bail to persons not the representatives of the owners, and the rights of owners upon recapture is not extinguished by it.

The recapture also gave rise to a case that reached the U.S. Supreme Court, involving insurance on the vessel and cargo, in which the plaintiffs won against the insurance company. The court ruled that because the vessel could be considered a total loss, the policy holder was entitle to collect under the policy.

Lastly, when Hibberts reached London after having been recaptured, there was a case in which it was found that her crew had left her without having been discharged. Hurry and Co. had hired a crew in Halifax to bring her back to London. When she arrived above the West Indies Docks, the crew left her, but without acquiring certificates of discharge. Unfortunately for them a customs officer ordered her to be moved to the West Indian Docks because some of her cargo was from the West Indies. The owners had to have her moved. The court ruled that the crew had not deserted her (in which they would have been mulcted of all pay), but that the crew would be mulcted of one month's pay in favour of the Greenwich Hospital. The case was cited in another case.

Year	Master	Owner	Trade	Source & notes
1806	J.Butcher; J.Wilson	Hurry; Hunter & Co.	London–Jamaica	LR; damages & good repair 1792, damages & thorough thorough repair 1796, & damages repaired 1798
1809	A.Wilson	Hunter & Co.	London–Honduras	LR; damages repair 1796 & 1798, new fir topsides 1806
1811	A.Wilson	Hunter & Co.	London–Yucatán	LR; new fir topsides 1806, and thorough repair 1809

== Fate ==
A French privateer succeeded in 1811 in capturing Hibberts a third and last time, and took her into Dunkirk.

== The Hibbert Gate ==
George Hibbert was one of the directors of the West India Docks, completed in 1802. Hibberts was the model for the sculpture that adorned the western gate, leading to it being known as the "Hibbert Gate". The gate was torn down in 1932. A replica of the original gate has since been erected on the Canary Wharf site in 2000 as a memorial for the docks.

== Poplar ==
The Hibberts is the ship commemorated on the civic seal of the London Borough of Poplar

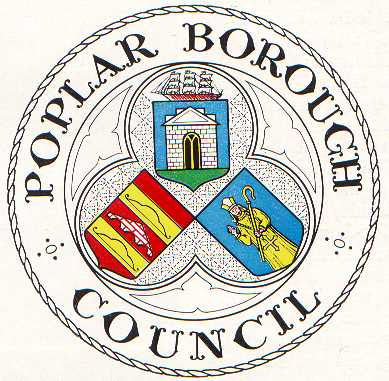
Poplar Borough Council blazon
