= Hibbs =

Hibbs is a surname, originally chiefly from Devon. Its etymology may be either Patronymic, from a diminutive of the name Hibbert; or a Matronymic of the Medieval female name Ibb, in turn a pet name from Isabel or Isabelle.

Notable people with the surname include:

- Albert Hibbs (1924-2003), American mathematician
- Ben Hibbs (1901–1975), American writer and editor
- Harry Hibbs (footballer) (1906–1984), English footballer
- Harry Hibbs (musician) (1942–1989), Canadian musician
- Jesse Hibbs (1906–1985), American film and television director
- Jim Hibbs (born 1944), American baseball player
- Loren Hibbs (born 1961), American baseball player and coach
- Robert John Hibbs (1943–1966), American military officer and Medal of Honor recipient

== See also ==
- W. B. Hibbs and Company Building, listed on the National Register of Historic Places in Washington, D.C.
