= Hare Hill =

Country house in Cheshire, England

Coordinates: 53.2875°N 2.1902°W

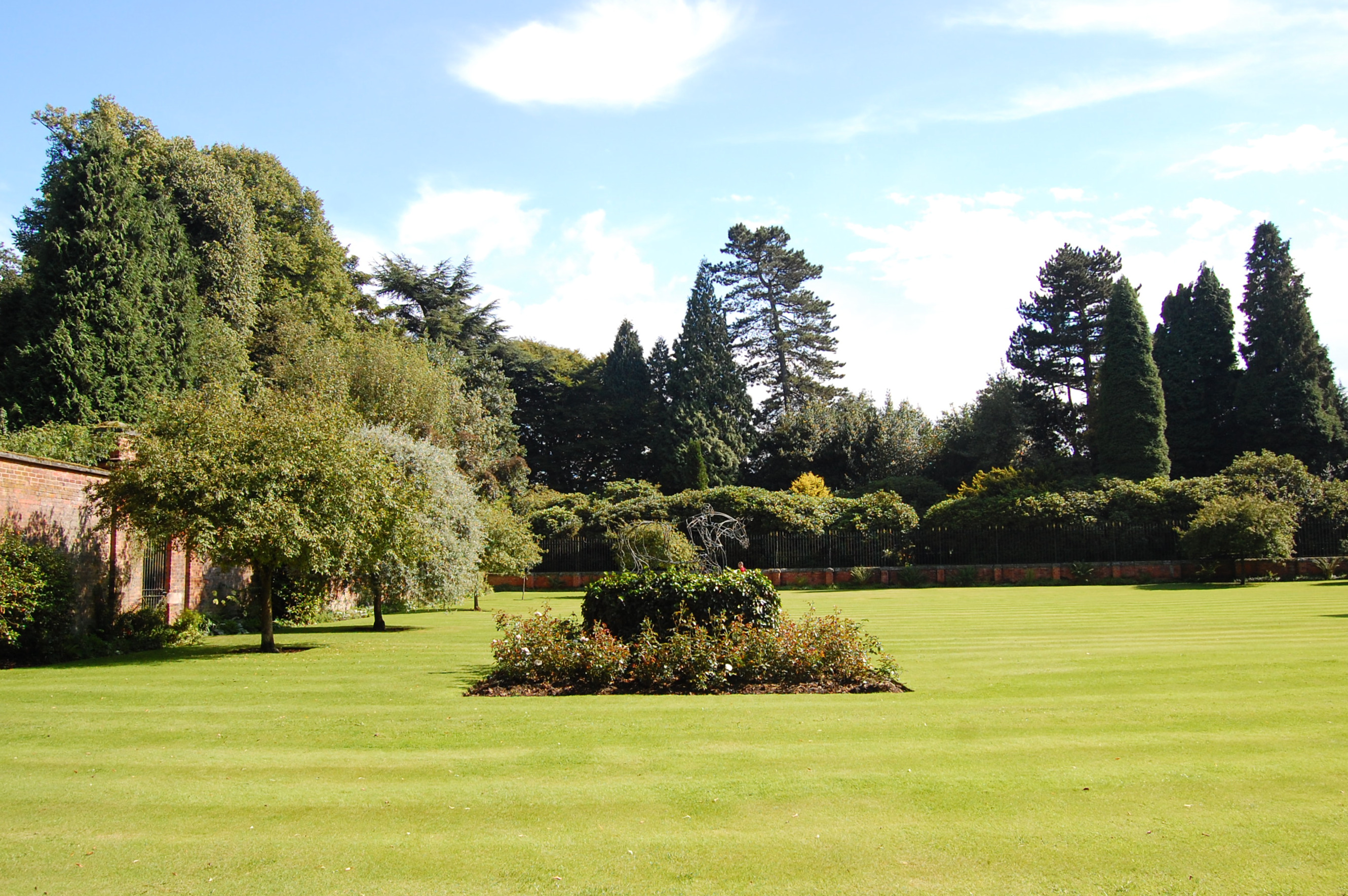
Walled garden in Hare Hill

Hare Hill Hall is a country house and a garden in the parish of Over Alderley, Cheshire, England. The house and grounds are privately owned, and the separate nearby garden is in the care of the National Trust.

== House ==
The house was built in about 1800 for William Hibbert of Birtles Hall. It was extended and remodelled in the middle of the 19th century for the Brocklehurst family. The house is constructed in red brick and has Welsh slate roofs. The architectural style is Georgian. It has two storeys, and the east front has three bays. Along the whole of the east front, and extending to the south front, is a continuous verandah carried on cast iron Chinoiserie supports. It is decorated with a frieze and has a tented glass roof. The house is recorded in the National Heritage List for England as a designated Grade II listed building.

== Garden ==
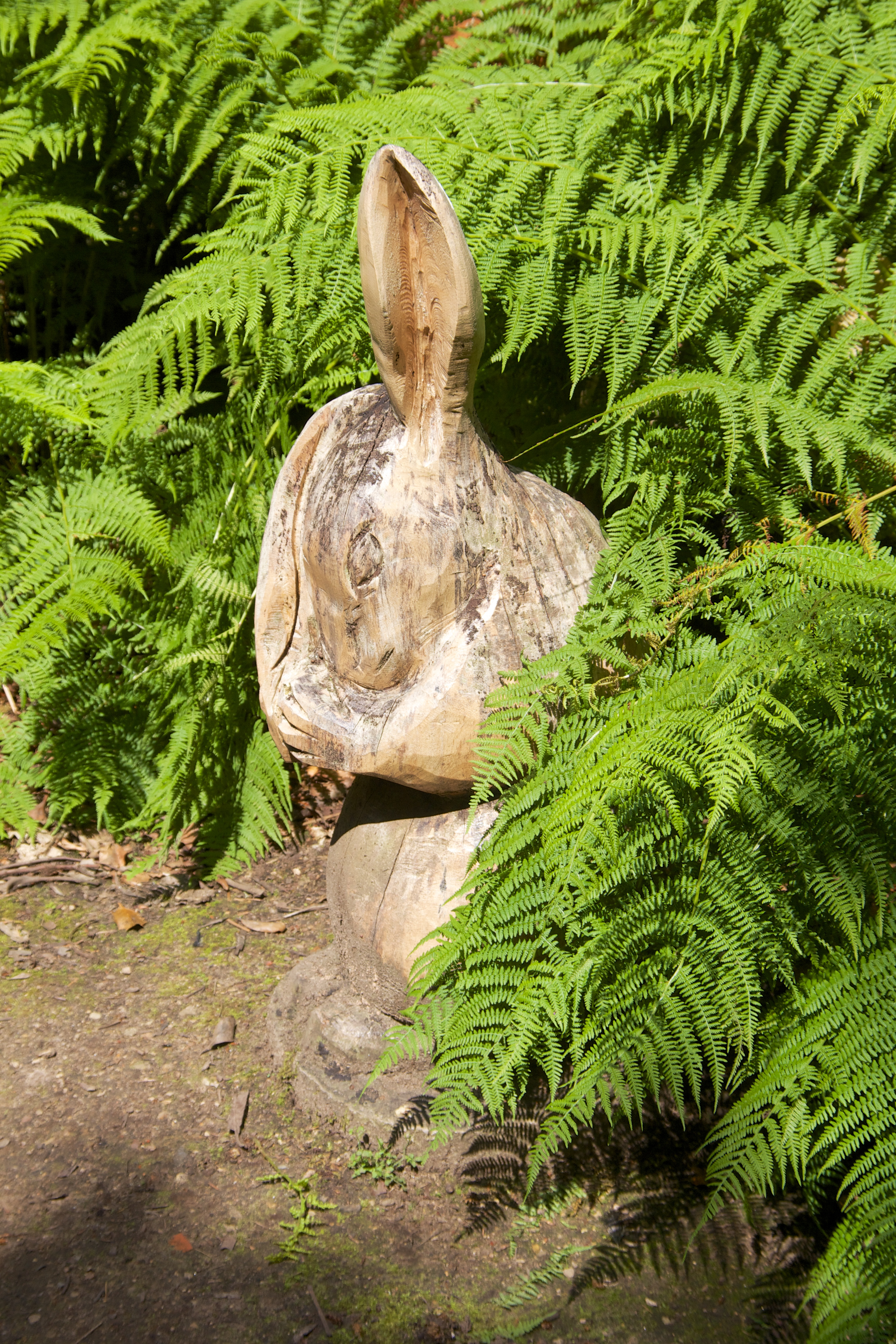
A hare sculpture at Hare Hill.

The National Trust wooded garden contains over 70 varieties of rhododendron, plus azaleas, hollies, and hostas. At its centre is a walled garden containing a pergola and wire sculptures. A permissive path leads from the garden to the ridge of Alderley Edge. The garden is open to the public at advertised times; there is an admission charge.

The garden was owned by Col. Charles Brocklehurst until his death in 1981. Col. Brocklehurst was advised by the plantsman, James Russell. The Georgian mansion was sold by the Trust in 1978 to help finance the running of the gardens. The owner of the garden was a great rhododendron enthusiast and steadily introduced them into the garden from 1960 onwards. The climate and soil has allowed them to flourish here. The Trust has replaced many of the common purple variety with more colourful and exotic varieties and has extended the season for visiting the garden by planting roses, lacecaps, euchryphia and hydrangeas, although the early interest is already sustained by snowdrops, daffodils, a huge clematis Montana, Skunk Cabbage and magnolia. The walled garden with its numerous climbers features a large lawn without a centrepiece. The main feature of the garden is the collection of over 50 hollies, silver and golden leaved and yellow and orange berried varieties, including the rare Highclere holly.

== See also ==
- Listed buildings in Over Alderley
