= List of shipwrecks in October 1830 =

The list of shipwrecks in October 1830 includes ships sunk, foundered, grounded, or otherwise lost during October 1830.

== 2 October ==
List of shipwrecks: 2 October 1830
Ship	State	Description
Ann	United Kingdom	The ship foundered in the Irish Sea off Tenby, Pembrokeshire with the loss of all hands.

== 3 October ==
List of shipwrecks: 3 October 1830
Ship	State	Description
Pelorus	United Kingdom	The ship was driven ashore in Dundrum Bay. She was on a voyage from Liverpool, Lancashire to Lisbon, Portugal.

== 4 October ==
List of shipwrecks: 4 October 1830
Ship	State	Description
Abeona	United Kingdom	The ship foundered in the Atlantic Ocean (47°07′N 38°05′W). Her crew were rescued by Troughton (United Kingdom). Abeona was on a voyage from Liverpool, Lancashire to Quebec City, Lower Canada, British North America.

== 5 October ==
List of shipwrecks: 5 October 1830
Ship	State	Description
Minister von Motz	Stettin	The ship was driven ashore on Skagen, Denmark. Her crew were rescued. She was on a voyage from London, United Kingdom to Stettin.

== 9 October ==
List of shipwrecks: 9 October 1830
Ship	State	Description
Gowan	United Kingdom	The ship was wrecked in Algoa Bay. Her crew were rescued.
Isabella	United Kingdom	The ship ran aground on the Cerberus Rock, in the Gut of Canso. She was refloated the next day and taken in to Arichat, Nova Scotia, British North America, where she was declared a constructive total loss. Isabella was on a voyage from Greenock, Renfrewshire to Miramichi, New Brunswick, British North America.

== 13 October ==
List of shipwrecks: 13 October 1830
Ship	State	Description
Goede Hoop	flag unknown	The ship foundered in the North Sea. She was on a voyage from Newcastle upon Tyne, Northumberland, United Kingdom to "Dram".
Volusia	United Kingdom	The brig was wrecked in the São Francisco River, Brazil. All on board were rescued. She was on a voyage from Hobart, Van Diemen's Land to Glasgow, Renfrewshire.

== 14 October ==
List of shipwrecks: 14 October 1830
Ship	State	Description
Henry	United Kingdom	The ship departed from Puerto Rico for London. No further trace, presumed foundered with the loss of all hands.
Thomas	United Kingdom	The ship was driven ashore and wrecked on Texa, Inner Hebrides. She was on a voyage from Dublin to Riga, Russia.

== 15 October ==
List of shipwrecks: 15 October 1830
Ship	State	Description
Oss Frederika	(Denmark) Duchy of Holstein	The ship was wrecked on Læsø, Denmark with the loss of all hands. She was on a voyage from Newcastle upon Tyne, Northumberland, United Kingdom to Flensburg.

== 16 October ==
List of shipwrecks: 16 October 1830
Ship	State	Description
Clio	United Kingdom	The ship was wrecked on "Rano Island". She was on a voyage from Riga, Russia to a British port.
Queen Adelaide	United Kingdom	The ship capsized in the River Thames at Rotherhithe, Surrey. Her crew were rescued.

== 17 October ==
List of shipwrecks: 17 October 1830
Ship	State	Description
Rook	United States	The ship departed from New York for Madeira, Portugal. No further trace, presumed foundered in the Atlantic Ocean with the loss of all hands.

== 18 October ==
List of shipwrecks: 18 October 1830
Ship	State	Description
Hibberts	United Kingdom	The ship was abandoned in the Atlantic Ocean. She was on a voyage from Quebec City, Lower Canada, British North America to London. Her crew were rescued by Henry ( (United Kingdom of Great Britain and Ireland) British North America). Hibberts was driven ashore and wrecked 3 nautical miles (5.6 km) south of Porto, Portugal on 1 February.
Perseverance	United Kingdom	The ship departed from Newcastle upon Tyne, Northumberland for New York, United States. No further trace, presumed foundered with the loss of all hands.

== 19 October ==
List of shipwrecks: 19 October 1830
Ship	State	Description
Sarah	United Kingdom	The ship foundered in the Atlantic Ocean. Her crew were rescued. She was on a voyage from London to Saint John, New Brunswick, British North America.
Swallow	United Kingdom	The ship sank at Cox's Quay, London.

== 20 October ==
List of shipwrecks: 20 October 1830
Ship	State	Description
Betsey	United Kingdom	The ship was wrecked on the Elbow End Sand, in the North Sea with the loss of all hands. She was on a voyage from Newcastle upon Tyne, Northumberland to Dundee, Forfarshire.
Bridget	United Kingdom	The ship sank off Cable Island, County Cork. She was on a voyage from Youghal to Cork.
Herald	United States	The fishing schooner went ashore on Eastern Point and became a total loss. Crew saved.
Resolution	United Kingdom	The ship departed from Belfast, County Antrim for Maryport, Cumberland. She subsequently foundered off the Mull of Galloway, Wigtownshire.

== 21 October ==
List of shipwrecks: 21 October 1830
Ship	State	Description
Friends	United Kingdom	The ship was in collision with Friends (United Kingdom) in the North Sea off Cromer, Norfolk and foundered. Her crew were rescued. She was on a voyage from Faversham, Kent to Newcastle upon Tyne, Northumberland.

== 22 October ==
List of shipwrecks: 22 October 1830
Ship	State	Description
Joshua	United Kingdom	The ship was wrecked 6 leagues (18 nautical miles (33 km) from Veracruz, Mexico. She was on a voyage from Liverpool, Lancashire to Veracruz.

== 23 October ==
List of shipwrecks: 23 October 1830
Ship	State	Description
Indian Queen	United Kingdom	The ship was wrecked on the French Keys. She was on a voyage from Jamaica to St. Andrews, New Brunswick, British North America.

== 24 October ==
List of shipwrecks: 24 October 1830
Ship	State	Description
Barbara and Agnes	United Kingdom	The ship was driven ashore in Sandwick Bay. Her crew were rescued. She was on a voyage from Wick, Caithness to Newry, County Armagh.
Donets	Imperial Russian Navy	The transport ship ran aground and was wrecked at az:Urunos, west of Chilov in the Caspian Sea. Her crew were rescued. She was on a voyage from Astrakhan to Persia. Donets was subsequently dismantled in situ.
Liberty	United Kingdom	The brig was wrecked on the Shipwash Sand, in the North Sea off the coast of Essex. Her crew were rescued by Pearl (United Kingdom).

== 26 October ==
List of shipwrecks: 26 October 1830
Ship	State	Description
Clapton	United Kingdom	The sloop was driven ashore and wrecked near Mundesley, Norfolk with the loss of all hands.
Conway Castle	United Kingdom	The ship struck the Dutchman's Bank and sank. She was on a voyage from Conwy, Caernarfonshire to Liverpool, Lancashire.
Flora	Netherlands	The ship foundered off Christiansand, Norway. Her crew were rescued. She was on a voyage from Saint Petersburg, Russia to Amsterdam, North Holland.
Jolly Bachelor	United Kingdom	The ship foundered in the North Sea off Fraserburgh, Aberdeenshire with the loss of all hands. She was on a voyage from Easdale, Argyllshire to Sunderland, County Durham.
Robert Fulton	United Kingdom	The ship was wrecked on the "Isle of Flores". All 96 people on board were rescued. She was on a voyage from New York, United States to Liverpool, Lancashire.

== 27 October ==
List of shipwrecks: 27 October 1830
Ship	State	Description
Albion	United Kingdom	The ship was wrecked near Bergen, Norway. Her crew were rescued. She was on a voyage from Arkhangelsk, Russia to London.
Jolly	United Kingdom	The ship foundered in the North Sea off Fraserburgh, Aberdeenshire with the loss of all hands. She was on a voyage from Easedale, Argyllshire to Sunderland, County Durham.
Tyne	United Kingdom	The ship was wrecked on the Sker Sand, in the Bristol Channel. Her crew were rescued. She was on a voyage from Wick, Caithness to Swansea, Glamorgan.

== 28 October ==
List of shipwrecks: 28 October 1830
Ship	State	Description
Albion	United Kingdom	The ship was driven ashore and wrecked at Trondheim, Norway.

== 29 October ==
List of shipwrecks: 29 October 1830
Ship	State	Description
Henry	(United Kingdom of Great Britain and Ireland) British North America	The brig was driven ashore at Llanmadoc, Glamorgan. All on board survived. She was on a voyage from Quebec City, Lower Canada to Penclawdd, Glamorgan. Henry was refloated on 2 December.
Union	United Kingdom	The ship foundered in the North Sea off St. Abb's Head, Berwickshire. Her crew were rescued by the whaler Alfred (United Kingdom). Union was on a voyage from Leith, Lothian to Cardiff, Glamorgan.

== 30 October ==
List of shipwrecks: 30 October 1830
Ship	State	Description
Anglia	United Kingdom	The ship was wrecked in Sandside Bay. She was on a voyage from Quebec City, Lower Canada, British North America to Stockton-on-Tees, County Durham.
Economy	United Kingdom	The ship foundered off Flamborough Head, East Riding of Yorkshire or off Hamburg. Her crew were rescued.
Lever	United Kingdom	The ship foundered in the Atlantic Ocean off Land's End, Cornwall. She was on a voyage from Newport, Monmouthshire to Falmouth, Cornwall.

== 31 October ==
List of shipwrecks: 31 October 1830
Ship	State	Description
Katherine	United States	The ship was wrecked on Dog Island, Florida. She was on a voyage from New Orleans, Louisiana to Marseille, Bouches-du-Rhône, France.

== Unknown date ==
List of shipwrecks: Unknown date 1830
Ship	State	Description
British Colony	United Kingdom	The ship was driven ashore and wrecked near Christiansand, Norway before 8 October. She was on a voyage from Christiansand to Hull, Yorkshire.
Carolina Augusta	Russia	The ship was wrecked in the Seine. She was on a voyage from Rouen, Seine-Inférieure, France to Saint Petersburg.
Caroline	Netherlands	The ship was wrecked on the Teycler Plot in early October with the loss of four of her crew. She was on a voyage from Saint Petersburg, Russia to Antwerp.
Catherine Fanny	United Kingdom	The sloop was driven ashore at Dinas Dinlle, Caernarfonshire in early October. She was on a voyage from Nefyn, Caernarfonshire to Caernarfon.
Freundschaft	Bremen	The ship sank near Hel, Prussia before 28 October. Her crew were rescued.
HMS Glatton	Royal Navy	The fourth rate was sunk as a breakwater at Harwich, Essex
Mary	United Kingdom	The ship was wrecked at Berkeley Point, Gloucestershire. Her seven crew were rescued. She was on a voyage from Bridgwater, Somerset to Gloucester.
Nereus	(United Kingdom of Great Britain and Ireland) New South Wales	The barque was wrecked at Sydney.
Ockezakoff	Russia	The ship was wrecked at Strömstad, Sweden. She was on a voyage from Lisbon, Portugal to Saint Petersburg.
Sally	(United Kingdom of Great Britain and Ireland) New South Wales	The sloop was wrecked at Sydney.
