= Dawes Hicks =

British philosopher and writer (1862–1941)

- Dawes Hicks in 1915
- Born: 14 September 1862; Shrewsbury
- Died: 16 February 1941 (aged 78)
- Education: Owens College Manchester
- Occupations: Philosopher, writer
- Employer: University College London

George Dawes Hicks FBA (14 September 1862 – 16 February 1941) was a British philosopher who was the first professor of moral philosophy at University College London from 1904 until 1928 and professor emeritus thereafter until his death.

== Biography ==
Hicks, eldest son of solicitor Christopher Hicks, was born in Shrewsbury on 14 September 1862 and educated at the Royal Grammar School, Guildford. He initially went on to study law within his father's legal practice. Hicks won a scholarship and went, in 1884, to Owens College Manchester to study philosophy (and gain some knowledge of the natural sciences). He did so under Robert Adamson "whose philosophical scholarship and acuteness exercised the most radical and lasting effect upon his pupil's life and teaching". Hicks graduated in 1888 with first class honours. Hicks then went to Manchester College, Oxford, and followed the lectures of Wallace, Nettleship and Cook Wilson.

Elected a Hibbert Scholar 1891–96, Hicks did further research at the University of Leipzig under Wundt, Heinze, and Volelt and assisted Meumann in his experimental investigations on apprehension of time. Hicks also advanced his earlier studies in physiology but concentrated his greater efforts on a detailed textual study of Kant (and mastering the relevant literature). He gained his PhD at Leipzig in 1896 with a thesis on Kant which was to be published the following year.

On his return from Germany in 1897 Hicks became minister of Unity Church in Islington until 1903, and lectured for the London School of Ethics and Sociology. In 1904 he was made Litt.D. by Manchester University and was appointed to the Chair of Moral Philosophy at University College London (UCL). Hicks was the first person to fill the position which had lain vacant since UCL first advertised for two Chairs in philosophy in 1827. Carveth Read then the Grote Professor of Mind and Logic, as Jonathan Wolff reports, persuaded the College to make such an appointment and thus fulfill "for the first time the original conception of the Department". (Wollf notes that Hicks is sometimes referred to as a Grote Professor, but that he was never given the title and, indeed may not have been entitled to hold it, due to his involvement in religious ministry.)

During his time at UCL, Hicks continued to live, at least partly, in Cambridge where he regularly lectured at the university, under the auspices of the Faculty of Moral Science, on Psychology and on the Philosophy of Kant (and examined in the Moral Sciences Tripos on the former). He also "as a labour of love" gave annual lectures at Carmarthen College (a training college for teachers at religious schools) which were to be published in 1928 under the title "Ways towards the Spiritual Life". (Hicks was also for thirty years a trustee of Dr. Williams's Library.)

S.V. Keeling (whose early studies at UCL were directed under Hick's advisement and who would later return there as an MA student and then as a lecturer during his tenure) describes Hicks as being, as a teacher "a man of single-mind, wholly engrossed in philosophy". Keeling reports that Hicks believed that philosophy "as no other subject, could impart to … students an influence and a training such as would render them habitually reflective about their existence and destiny". Hicks "ever saw clearly that the spiritual value of philosophical studies far outweighed their academic importance" but denied "that philosophy could legitimately serve as a substitute for religion or for religious faith". Hicks' significant efforts and influence as a teacher at UCL are testified to by Keeling, de Burgh and Stebbing alike and reported on by Wolff.

Having already been secretary of the Aristotelian Society for many years, Hicks was made its president in 1913 and was elected a fellow of the British Academy in 1927. He retired from UCL the following year and thereafter lived entirely in Cambridge but continued his long serving work as a sub-editor of the Hibbert Journal to his sick bed and, as Stebbing reports, "was writing his famous 'Philosophical Survey' for that Journal when death came, rather suddenly at the end" on 16 January 1941, aged 78.

== Philosophical theism ==
Hicks was a Christian theist in his personal life but authored The Philosophical Bases Of Theism, a work on philosophical theism based on his Hibbert Lectures from 1931. The book utilized cosmological, moral and teleological arguments for the existence of God. Hicks rejected any form of mysticism and disputed the evidence of religious belief from mystical experiences. The book argued for theism but was not concerned with Christianity or any other specific revelation. It has been described as Hicks' "most able and impressive work".

== Collections ==
Hicks donated his archive to University College London in 1941. The collection includes texts of his lectures given at UCL and Owens College Manchester, and notes on a campaign to establish a teaching university within the University of London.

== Works ==
=== Major philosophical works ===
- Ways Towards the Spiritual Life (1928)
- Berkeley Ernest Benn Ltd., London, (1932)
- The Philosophical Bases Of Theism Hibbert Lectures (1937)
- Critical Realism (1938)

=== Select journal articles/book chapters ===
- "Sense-Presentation and Thought", Proceedings of the Aristotelian Society New Series, Vol. 6 (1905–1906), pp. 271–346, reprinted in The Emergence of Analytic Philosophy and a Controversy at the Aristotelian Society, 1900 - 1916: Virtual Issue No. 2 (2014)
- "The Nature and Development of Attention" British Journal of Psychology, Volume V, Part 1, 1913
- "Appearances and Real Existence" Proceedings of the Aristotelian Society, New Series, Volume XIV (1913–1914), pp. 1–48 reprinted in The Emergence of Analytic Philosophy and a Controversy at the Aristotelian Society, 1900 - 1916: Virtual Issue No. 2 (2014)
- "The Nature of Willing" Proceedings of the Aristotelian Society New Series, Vol. 13 (1912–1913), pp. 27–65
- "The Nature of Sense-Data", Mind Vol. 21, No. 83 (Jul. 1912), pp. 399–409. [see also: "The Nature of Sense-Data.-A Reply to Dr. Dawes Hicks", by Bertrand Russell, Mind, Vol. 22, No. 85 (Jan. 1913), pp. 76–78]
- "From Idealism to Realism" in Contemporary British philosophy (1925)

=== Further scholarly works ===
- "Foreword" in Kant's Conception Of God by F. E. England (1929)
- "A Century of Philosophy at University College, London" (1928) Journal of Philosophical Studies, Vol. 3, No. 12 (Oct. 1928), pp. 468–482 JSTOR 3745678
