= Ilbert =

Ilbert is a surname. Notable people with the surname include:

- Courtenay Ilbert (1841–1924), British lawyer and civil servant
- Courtenay Adrian Ilbert (1888–1956), civil engineer and collector
- Peregrine Ilbert (1765–1805), English cleric

== See also ==
- Hilbert (name)
