= St Catherine's Church, Over Alderley =

Coordinates: 53.2699°N 2.2074°W

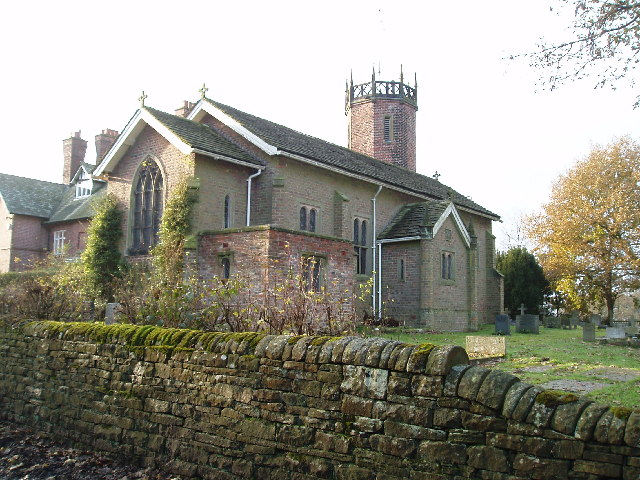
- St Catherine's Church, Over Alderley, from the northeast

- Location in Cheshire
- OS grid reference: SJ 863 748
- Location: Over Alderley, Cheshire
- Country: England
- Denomination: Anglican
- Website: St Catherine, Birtles

History
- Status: Parish church
- Consecrated: 24 February 1890

Architecture
- Functional status: Active
- Architectural type: Church
- Completed: 1840

Specifications
- Capacity: 120
- Materials: Red brick with buff sandstone dressings Kerridge stone slate roof

Administration
- Province: York
- Diocese: Chester
- Archdeaconry: Macclesfield
- Deanery: Knutsford
- Parish: St Catherine, Birtles

Clergy
- Vicar: Revd James C. Milnes

St Catherine's Church, Over Alderley, also known as St Catherine's Church, Birtles, stands in an isolated position in Birtles Lane, near to Birtles Hall, in the civil parish of Over Alderley, Cheshire, England. It is recorded in the National Heritage List for England as a designated Grade II* listed building. It was originally a private chapel for the Hibbert family and is now a parish church. It is unusual in that its tower is octagonal. It contains furnishings and stained glass from Germany and the Netherlands. The church is listed in England's Thousand Best Churches. It is an active Anglican church in the diocese of Chester, the archdeaconry of Macclesfield and the deanery of Knutsford. Its benefice has been combined with that of St Philip & St James, Alderley Edge since 2022.

== History ==
St Catherine's was built as a private chapel by Thomas Hibbert of Birtles Hall in 1840. It became the parish church of Birtles and Over Alderley in 1890.

== Architecture ==
=== Exterior ===
The church is built in red brick with buff sandstone dressings. It has a Kerridge stone-slate roof with a stone ridge. At its southwest corner is an octagonal tower. The plan of the body of the church consists of a five-bay nave, a short chancel, a south porch, and a baptistry in a corresponding position on the north side. The tower has three stages with stone bands at each stage, single-light windows, and is surmounted by an openwork stone lattice balustrade with plain pinnacles.

=== Interior ===
The stained glass and furnishings were collected by the Hibbert family from Germany and the Netherlands. The stained glass came from the Netherlands and dates from the late 16th and early 17th centuries, The furnishings include a pulpit dated 1686 containing carved panels including one of the Annunciation on the front, and of images including dolphins, putti, and lions on the back, a manorial pew made from 17th-century carved Flemish oak, and a medieval eagle lectern, which may be the earliest of English origin in the county. There is a second lectern, carved by Mrs Hibbert in about 1894. The reredos is decorated with panels, lion masks, and flowers. The two large brass chandeliers are copies of chandeliers in Milan Cathedral. The tower contains eight bells giving a full octave. The bells were donated in 1895 by the three Hibbert sisters.

The stained glass consists of "an expertly mixed assemblage", with dates ranging from 1541 to 1628. The internal walls were formerly covered in frescoes by Colonel Hugh Robert Hibbert, son of Thomas, who also built an organ for the chapel. The organ was replaced in 1909 by Peter Conacher of Huddersfield. Improvements and renovations were carried out in 1949, 1951 and 1983. The frescoes were painted over in 1950. In 1999 two etched glass memorials to Major Hugh and Mrs Susan Hibbert by Simon Whistler were installed.

== See also ==
- Grade II* listed buildings in Cheshire East
- Listed buildings in Over Alderley
