= Portrait of George Hibbert =

Painting by Thomas Lawrence

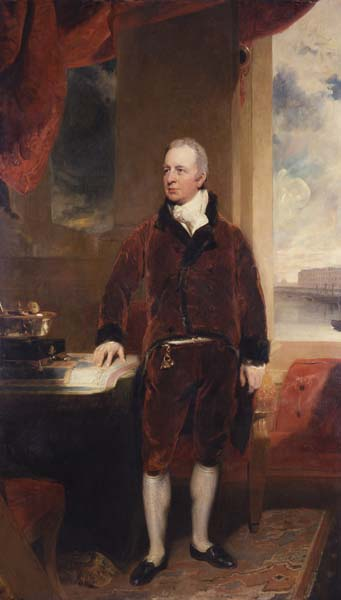
- Artist: Thomas Lawrence
- Year: 1811
- Type: Oil on canvas, portrait painting
- Dimensions: 244 cm × 146 cm (96 in × 57 in)
- Location: Docklands Museum; London

'Portrait of George Hibbert is an 1811 portrait painting by the British artist Thomas Lawrence. It depicts George Hibbert, an English merchant and politician with strong links to Jamaica. A Whig Member of Parliament, he was for many years the colonial agent for Jamaica in London. Along with Robert Milligan, he was a major figure behind the construction of the West India Docks on the Isle of Dogs.

The painting was commissioned for 300 guineas by the West India Docks Company. He is shown at full-length with the West India Docks behind him and his hand resting on the architectural plans. Hibbert was a fierce opponent of the British abolitionist movement to abolish slavery and was a major slaveowner himself. Lawrence was the leading portraitist of the Regency era. He also depicted notable abolitionists such as Philip Sansom and William Wilberforce.

The painting is part of the collection of the Port of London Authority, but is on long-term display at the Museum of the Docklands in London.

== Bibliography ==
- Donington, Katie. The Bonds of Family: Slavery, Commerce and Culture in the British Atlantic World. Manchester University Press, 2019.
- Martinez-Ruiz, Barbaro, Forrester, Gillian & Barringer, T.J. Art and Emancipation in Jamaica; Isaac Mendes Belisario and His Worlds. Yale Center for British Art, 2007.
- Levey, Michael. Sir Thomas Lawrence. Yale University Press, 2005.
- Morris, Michael. Scotland and the Caribbean, C.1740-1833: Atlantic Archipelagos. Taylor & Francis, 2015.
