= The Theological Review =

English theological journal (1864–1879)

The Theological Review: A Quarterly Journal of Religious Thought was an English Unitarian theological journal that ran from 1864 to 1879. It was edited by Charles Beard and published by Williams and Norgate.
