= Over Alderley =

Civil parish in Cheshire, England

Coordinates: 53.284°N 2.195°W

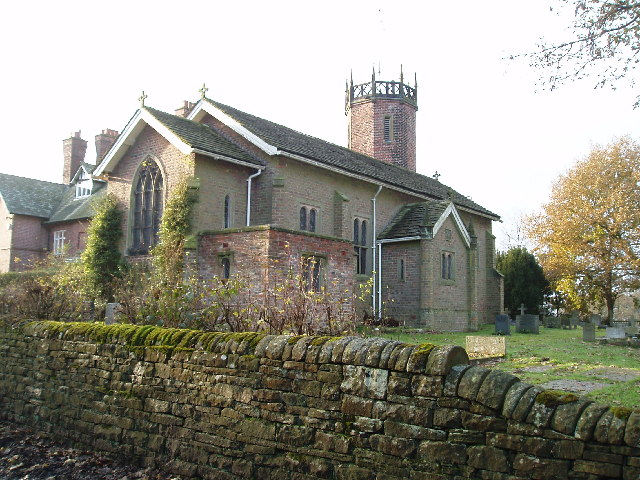
- St Catherine's Church, Over Alderley

- Location within Cheshire
- Population: 318 (2011)
- OS grid reference: SJ870763
- Civil parish: Over Alderley
- Unitary authority: Cheshire East
- Ceremonial county: Cheshire
- Region: North West
- Country: England
- Sovereign state: United Kingdom
- Post town: MACCLESFIELD
- Postcode district: SK10
- Dialling code: 01625
- Police: Cheshire
- Fire: Cheshire
- Ambulance: North West
- UK Parliament: Macclesfield

Over Alderley is a civil parish in Cheshire, England. It had a population of 318 at the 2011 Census.

It includes the hamlets of Adders Moss, Adshead Green, Broadheath, Finlow Hill, Harebarrow, Harehill, Shaw Cross, Vardentown and Whirley.

== Notable buildings ==
St Catherine's Church, Over Alderley is a Grade II* listed building.

Alderley Lodge was built in the 19th century for the Brocklehurst family; it sits next to the National Trust land at Hare Hill.

Nearby Birtles Hall is listed Grade II.

== See also ==
- Listed buildings in Over Alderley
