= Whirley Hall =

Country house in Cheshire, England

Coordinates: 53.26831°N 2.18690°W

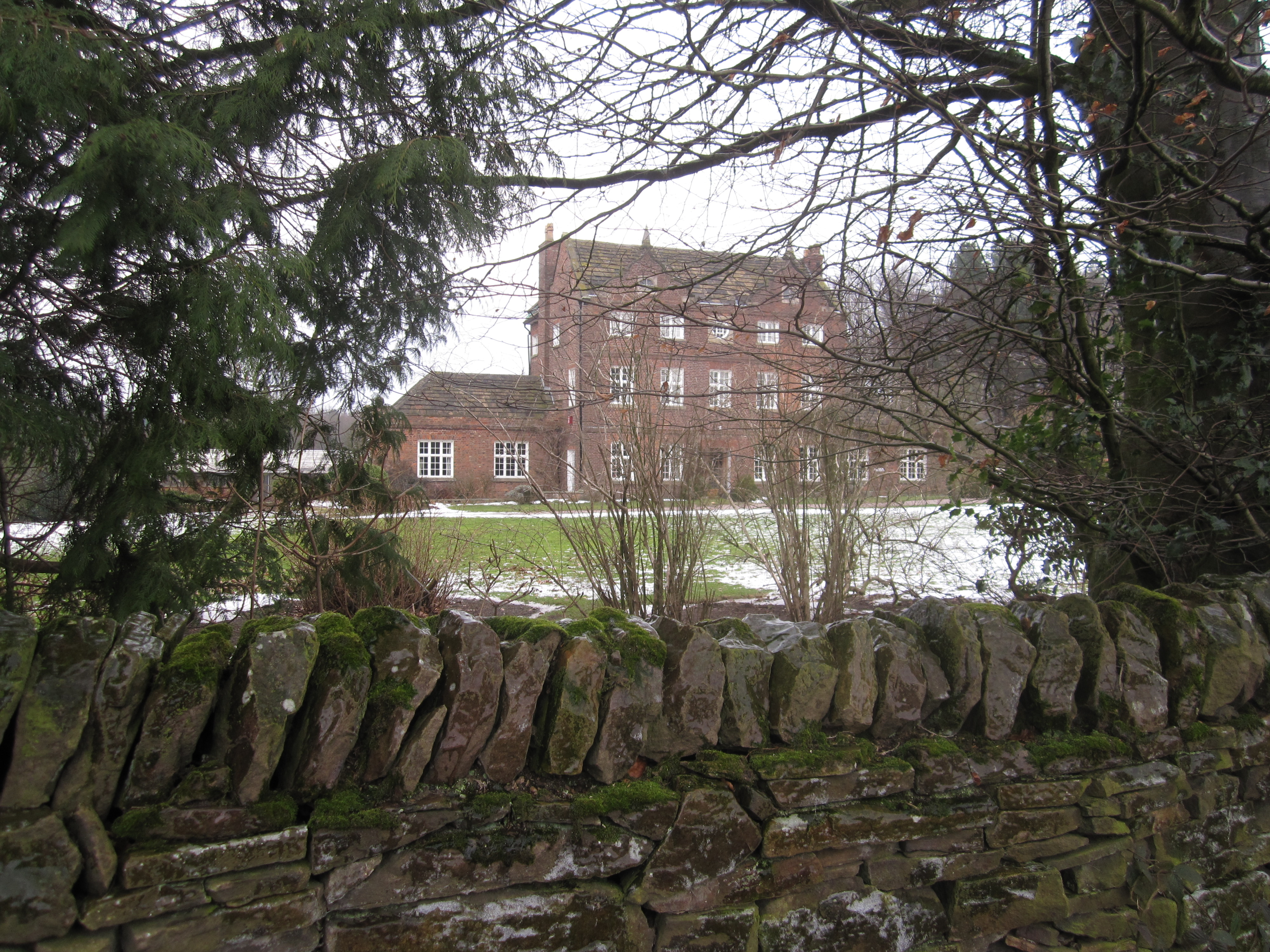
Whirley Hall

Whirley Hall is a country house standing to the north of the village of Henbury, Cheshire, England. The house dates from about 1670. Additions and alterations were made during the 18th century and in the 1950s, when the house was restored and wings were added at the sides. The house is constructed in brick with buff sandstone dressings, and has a Kerridge stone-slate roof with stone ridges. It has three storeys and symmetrical five-bay front. Between the storeys, and above the top storey, are brick bands. The lower two storeys contain 20th-century wooden-framed mullioned and transomed windows. In the top storey are two-light casement windows. Above these are two shaped gables, each surmounted by an obelisk finial, and containing an elliptical window. There are single-storey, two-bay extensions on each side of the house. In the roof of the house is a stone inscribed with the date 1599, which is considered to have been removed from an earlier timber-framed house. The house is recorded in the National Heritage List for England as a designated Grade II* listed building. The gate pier in front of the house is a Grade II listed building.

== See also ==
- Grade II* listed buildings in Cheshire East
- Listed buildings in Over Alderley
