= Hibbert (given name) =

Hibbert is a given name and can refer to:

- Hibbert 'Hib' Milks (1899–1949), a Canadian professional ice hockey forward
- Rev. Hibbert Newton (1817–1892), a poet and a publisher of British Israelism
- Hibbert Newton Binney (1766–1842), a soldier in the American Revolution
- Hibbert Binney (1819–1887), the Bishop of Nova Scotia from 1851 to his death, grandson of Hibbert Newton Binney
- Hibbert Newton (1820–1890), an Australian politician
- Alan Newton (1887–1949), an Australian surgeon who was the grandson of Australian politician Hibbert Newton, and whose first name was also Hibbert

== See also ==
- Hibert Ruíz
- Hibbert (surname)
