= Listed buildings in Over Alderley =

Over Alderley is a civil parish in Cheshire East, England. It contains 25 buildings that are recorded in the National Heritage List for England as designated listed buildings. Of these, three are listed at Grade II*, the middle grade, and the others are at Grade II. Other than the village of Ollerton, the parish is mainly rural. Apart from a church and three parish boundary stones, the listed buildings are all houses, farmhouses, and associated structures.

== Key ==
Grade	Criteria
II*	Particularly important buildings of more than special interest
II	Buildings of national importance and special interest

== Buildings ==
Name and location	Photograph	Date	Notes	Grade
Hayman's House; 53.28201°N 2.21880°W		1528	A small country house, with later additions and alterations. It is mainly timber-framed with brick nogging on a sandstone plinth, there are some repairs in brick, and it has a Kerridge stone-slate roof. The house is in an H-plan, and has two storeys and a four-bay front. The first bay is gabled, there is a two-storey porch in the second bay, the front of the third bay has been replaced in brick. The windows are casements, and there is a timber-framed outshoot to the rear.	II*
Higher Yewtree Farmhouse; 53.27552°N 2.19645°W	—	Mid-16th century	The former farmhouse is timber-framed with brick nogging and a thatched roof. There are later brick extensions at the rear. The house is in 1 1/2 storeys, and has a four-bay front. The windows are casements, and in the upper floor is a half-dormer.	II
Clock House Farmhouse; 53.29826°N 2.20073°W	—	16th century	The farmhouse was originally timber-framed and full cruck frames are still visible. It was altered and extended in brick in the 18th and 20th centuries. The farmhouse has a Kerridge stone-slate roof, and is in an L-plan. Some of the windows metal and other are wooden and mullioned. Inside the farmhouse is a large inglenook.	II
Barn, Higher House Farm; 53.27948°N 2.21642°W	—	Late 16th century	The barn has an L-shaped plan, it stands on a stone plinth, and has a Kerridge stone-slate roof. The older north range is timber-framed with brick nogging. It is in four bays, and contains a cart entrance and pitch holes. The east range dates from about 1700 and is in brick with stone quoins. It has an external staircase, and contains a pigeon cote.	II
Fittontown Farmhouse; 53.27706°N 2.18300°W	—	1631	The farmhouse is in brick on a sandstone plinth with sandstone quoins and a Welsh slate roof. It has a square plan, it is in two storeys, and has a symmetrical three-bay front. There is a central porch with a datestone above. The windows are mullioned and transomed.	II
Old House, Birtles Farm; 53.27738°N 2.20369°W	—	17th century	Originally a very small, two-room farmhouse that is no longer inhabited. It is timber-framed with infill partly of wattle and daub and partly of brick. It has an asbestos roof, and has been partly rebuilt in brick. There is a lean-to addition on the west side in brick with a Kerridge stone-slate roof.	II
Barn, Clock House Farm; 53.29846°N 2.20054°W	—	17th century	A timber-framed barn and shippon with wattle and daub and brick infill, standing on a large stone plinth. There is a corrugated asbestos roof. The building contains doorways and gabled half-dormers.	II
Vardentown; 53.27828°N 2.19219°W	—	17th century	This was originally a farmhouse, and was later converted into three cottages. An addition was made on the right side in the 18th century. The original building was timber-framed with plastered infill, and the addition is in brick. The roof is tiled. The building has a long rectangular plan, and is in two storeys. In the earlier section are two gabled porches, mullioned windows in the ground floor, and casements above in half-dormers with bargeboards and pointed finials.	II
Whirley Hall; 53.26831°N 2.18689°W		c. 1670	A brick country house with sandstone dressings and a Kerridge stone-slate roof. It is in three storeys and has a symmetrical five-bay front. In the lower two storeys are mullioned and transomed windows, and in the top floor the windows are casements. On top of the two outer bays is a gabled dormer with a shaped head surmounted by an obelisk finial. In the 1950s two-storey wings were added to the sides of the house.	II*
Gate pier, Whirley Hall; 53.26793°N 2.18672°W	—	Late 17th century	The gate pier, one of an original pair, stands in the garden of the hall. It is in sandstone, and has a moulded plinth, a square panelled body, a moulded capstone, and a mushroom finial with a gadrooned top. One of the panels contains a coat of arms.	II
Adshead Cottage; 53.28713°N 2.19826°W	—	Early 18th century	The cottage is in brick on a stone plinth and has a Kerridge stone-slate roof. It has one storey and an attic, and a three-bay front with a central gabled porch. The windows are casements.	II
Finlow Hill Cottage; 53.28651°N 2.21048°W	—	Mid-to late 18th century	Originally a farmhouse, it is in brick with a Kerridge stone-slate roof. It is in two storeys and has a symmetrical three-bay front. The middle bay projects forward and has a pediment containing an elliptical window. The other windows are casements. There is a timber gabled porch.	II
Higher House Farmhouse; 53.27927°N 2.21654°W		Mid-to late 18th century	A brick farmhouse on a sandstone plinth with a Welsh slate roof. It is in two storeys with an attic, and has a symmetrical three-bay front. The central bay projects slightly forward, and has a triangular pediment containing a stone plaque. The windows are casements.	II
Shippon and hayloft, Higher House Farmhouse; 53.27944°N 2.21682°W	—	Mid-to late 18th century	The shippon and hayloft are in brick on a plastered plinth and have a Welsh slate roof. The building has a long rectangular plan, and contains doorways, windows, pitch holes, and ventilation holes.	II
Parish boundary stone, Near Trugs Cottage; 53.27556°N 2.17322°W	—	1789	The boundary stone is in sandstone and consists of a rectangular block with a curved shaped top. It is inscribed with the letter "M" for Macclesfield.	II
Hare Hill; 53.28741°N 2.19000°W	—	Late 18th to early 19th century	A country house in brick with a Welsh slate roof. It is in two storeys, and has a three-bay east front. This has a cast iron verandah in the lower floor, with casement windows behind, and sashes in the upper floor. On the south front is a porch with a hipped roof carried on Tuscan columns.	II
Birtles Hall; 53.26807°N 2.21330°W		c. 1819	A country house that was damaged by fire in 1938 and reconstructed internally. It is built in sandstone with a Welsh slate roof, and is in two storeys. There is a symmetrical five-bay front with a frieze, a cornice, and a balustraded parapet. The central bay projects forward and contains an Ionic porch with semicircular niches on the sides. The windows are sashes, and on the east front are two canted bay windows.	II
Former haybarn, Birtles Hall; 53.26804°N 2.21385°W	—	Early 19th century	The former haybarn is in brick with a hipped slate roof. The building has an L-shaped plan, and inside are brick arches with semicircular heads, some of which have been blocked and sash windows inserted.	II
Stable block, Birtles Hall; 53.26863°N 2.21397°W	—	Early 19th century	The stable block has been converted into houses and for other uses. It is in brick on a gritstone plinth with hipped Welsh slate roofs. The block is in two storeys and has a U-shaped plan. The south front is in five bays, the central three of which are recessed, and have a pediment containing a clock face, and surmounted by an octagonal cupola with a finial and a weathervane. The block contains former carriage doorways and pitch holes, and has sash windows.	II
Terrace walls, Birtles Hall; 53.26769°N 2.21324°W	—	Early 19th century	The walls to the south and the east of the terrace are in sandstone. They are balustraded, and at intervals support gadooned urns. On the east side are two flights of steps.	II
Alderley Lodge; 53.28653°N 2.19440°W	—	Early 19th century	The lodge is in two storeys, it has a symmetrical three-bay front and a tiled roof. In the lower storey there is a stone arcade, and the upper storey is in brick with sandstone dressings. The windows are mullioned with lozenge glazing. On the left side is an oriel window.	II
Butler's Cottage; 53.28723°N 2.19325°W	—	Early 19th century	A brick cottage with a Welsh slate roof, it is in two storeys and has a symmetrical three-bay front. The windows are casements with lozenge glazing. On the front is a gabled trellised porch and a verandah.	II
St Catherine's Church; 53.26992°N 2.20732°W		1840	The church was built as a private chapel, and later became a parish church. It is in brick with sandstone dressings, and has a Kerridge stone-slate roof. The church consists of a nave, a chancel, a porch, and a baptistry. At the southwest corner is an octagonal tower with an openwork balustrade and plain pinnacles. The stained glass and the furnishings inside the church were collected and donated by the Hibbert family of Birtles Hall.	II*
Parish boundary stone 53.26933°N 2.18190°W	—	1849 (probable)	The boundary stone is in sandstone. It consists of a triangular block with a dormer top. The stone is inscribed with "B" for Birtles, "M" for Macclesfield and "A" for Alderley.	II
Parish boundary stone, Oak Lodge; 53.28683°N 2.18228°W		Mid-19th century	The boundary stone is in sandstone. It consists of a rectangular block with a semicircular head, and is inscribed with "A" for Alderley and "P" for Prestbury.	II
