= Charles Beard (Unitarian) =

English Unitarian minister, divine and author

Charles Beard (27 July 1827 – 9 April 1888) was an English Unitarian minister, divine and author.

== Early life ==
Beard was the eldest son of John Relly Beard, by his wife Mary (Barnes), and was born at Higher Broughton, Salford, on 27 July 1827. After passing through his father's school, he studied at Manchester New College (then at Manchester, now Harris Manchester College, Oxford) from 1843 to 1848, graduating B.A. at London University in 1847. He aided his father in compiling the Latin dictionary issued by Messrs. Cassell. In 1848-9 he continued his studies at Berlin.

== Ministry ==
On 17 Feb. 1850 he became assistant to James Brooks (1806–1854) at Hyde chapel, Gee Cross, Cheshire, succeeding in 1854 as sole pastor, and remaining till the end of 1866. He had accepted a call to succeed John Hamilton Thom at Renshaw Street Unitarian Chapel, Liverpool, and entered on this charge on 3 March 1867, retaining it till his death. In his denomination he took first rank as a preacher, and was equally successful in satisfying a cultured class by his written discourses, and in holding a popular audience by his spoken word. He was one of the secretaries (1857–79) and one of the visitors (1883–8) of Manchester New College; and a founder (1859) and the first secretary of the East Cheshire Missionary Association.

== Journalism ==
In addition to denominational activities, he combined in an unusual degree the pursuits of a scholar with journalistic writing and public work. During the cotton famine of 1862–64 he was the special correspondent of the Daily News. For many years he was a leader writer on the Liverpool Daily Post. His want of sympathy with home rule led him to sever his connection with political journalism. In the management of University College, Liverpool (founded 1881 and now the University of Liverpool), he took a leading part as vice-president. He was Hibbert Lecturer in 1883, taking for his subject the Reformation. In February 1888 he received the degree of LL.D. from St. Andrews. His numerous activities heavily taxed a robust constitution; in 1886 he spent six months in Italy; in 1887 his health was more seriously broken, and his congregation made provision for his taking a year's rest.

He died at 13 Southhill Road, Liverpool, on 9 April 1888, and was buried on 12 April in the graveyard of the Ancient Chapel, Toxteth Park. A mural tablet to his memory was placed in Renshaw Street chapel. He married (4 June 1850) Mary Ellen, daughter of Michael Shipman, who survived him with a son, Lewis Beard, town clerk of Coventry, and six daughters.

Beard published many of his sermons and lectures, with some being published posthumously. He contributed to the Christian Reformer, a monthly edited by Robert Brook Aspland; on its cessation he projected and edited The Theological Review (1864–79). He translated into English Ernest Renan's Hibbert lecture (1880).
