= Robert Mortimer Montgomery =

Oil painting of Robert Mortimer Montgomery.

Robert Mortimer Montgomery KC (October 1869 – 31 December 1948), was a British lawyer, school administrator, legal writer, and Liberal Party politician.

== Early life and education ==
Montgomery was born the son of Rev. John Knowles Montgomery, Unitarian Minister, Chester, and Mary M’Alister of Holywood, near Belfast. He was educated at King's School, Chester, from 1880 to 1888, and St Catherine's Society, Oxford, where he "distinguished himself as a university Soccer player".

== Professional career ==
Montgomery was Called to Bar, Inner Temple, 1893. He authored "several volumes on matters of Law", particularly relating to local government, including numerous editions of The Licensing Laws, or Montgomery's Licensing Practice, which by 1914 was described as a "well-known work". The book examined licensing laws relating to the sale of intoxicating liquors, and to theatres, music, dancing and billiards. In May 1906, he became a Governor of Channing School. He was appointed a KC in 1914, and that same year became a member of the Hibbert Trust. He was elected Chairman of Channing School in December, 1920, an office which he held until a few years before his death.

He was Recorder of Chester from 1926, and in 1929 became Chairman of the Hibbert Trust. In 1930, he was a member of a group of Canadian and European attorneys invited by the American Bar Association to visit the United States. During his time with the Hibbert Trust, he continued as Chairman of the Channing School, overseeing the temporary relocation of the school and its pupils to the West Country during World War II. Montgomery formally resigned as chairman in 1944, thereafter remaining a Governor of the school until 1946. He was also continually re-elected as Chairman of the Hibbert Trust every year until December, 1948.

In 1941, he published Montgomery's War Damage Act, followed by supplements in 1942 and 1943, necessitated by amendments to the Act. In 1944, he was elected Treasurer of the Inner Temple. Upon his death, he was eulogized in the Transactions of the Unitarian Historical Society with the assertion that few men "have rendered more conspicuous service than Robert Mortimer Montgomery to culture in general and education in particular".

== Political career ==
Montgomery was Liberal candidate for the Crewe division of Cheshire at the 1923 General Election. He was an independent Member of Committee on Holidays with Pay in 1938.

=== Electoral record ===
General Election 1923: Crewe
Party	Candidate	Votes	%	±%
Labour	Edward George Hemmerde	14,628	46.5	−4.4
Unionist	Thomas Joseph Strangman	8,734	27.8	n/a
Liberal	Robert Mortimer Montgomery	8,068	25.7	−23.4
Majority		5,894	18.7	+16.9
Turnout		31,430	82.8	+1.9
Labour hold		Swing	+9.5	

== Personal life ==
In 1900 he married Mabel Ayrton. They had one son and one daughter. Mabel died in 1927, and in 1932 he married Zilla Mary Stevenson. They had two sons.
