= Jaro Hilbert =

Slovenian painter (1897–1995)

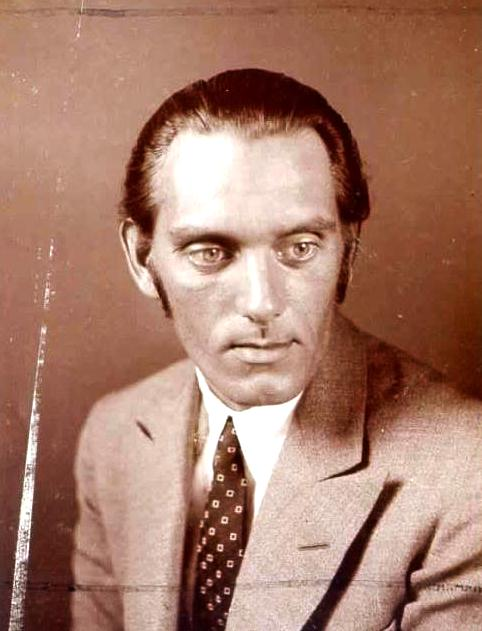
- Born: June 21, 1897; Krsko, Slovenia
- Died: March 1, 1995 (aged 97); Ville-d'Avray, France
- Education: Academy of Fine Arts in Prague
- Occupation: Painter

For the Czech dramatist and writer, see Jaroslav Hilbert.

Jaro Hilbert (June 21, 1897 - March 1, 1995) was a Slovenian painter. Born in Krsko and educated at the Academy of Fine Arts in Prague, he moved to Egypt and specialized in paintings of Egyptian and Palestinian landscapes. His artwork was exhibited at the Vatican.
