= Hibbert Newton =

Rev. Hibbert Newton D.D. (1817 – 1892) was a poet and an early proponent of British Israelism.

== Career ==
Hibbert Newton was educated at Trinity College, Dublin obtaining a B.A. in divinity studies, followed by a doctorate. He was ordained in 1847 and became vicar of St Michael's, Southwark, London, serving from 1867 to his death. He also was a successful poet and wrote a short tract entitled Israel Discovered in Anglo-Saxon, Protestant Kindred Nations (1874) which alongside Edward Hine's publications was one of the early influential works on British Israelism.

== Works ==
=== Poetry ===
The vale of Tempe; and other poems (1830)
The flight of the apostate (1849)
The resurrection of Israel: a poem; to which is added Death and the sculptors, or, Art against art : and other poems (1855?)
The fall of Babylon: an epic poem (1864)
The triumph of Israel: an epic poem (1894)

=== British Israelism ===
Israel Discovered in Anglo-Saxon, Protestant Kindred Nations (1874)

Israel, or the Ten Tribes, identified with the Anglo-Saxon and other branches of the Teutonic race. Being the report of a meeting of the Anglo-Ephraim Association held ... 24th June 1874, etc. [Edited by Hibbert Newton.]
