= Hibbert Lectures =

Series of lectures on theological issues

The Hibbert Lectures are an annual series of non-sectarian lectures on theological issues. They are sponsored by the Hibbert Trust, which was founded in 1847 by the Unitarian Robert Hibbert with a goal to uphold "the unfettered exercise of private judgement in matters of religion.". In recent years the lectures have been broadcast by the BBC.

== Lecturers ==
=== 1878–1894 (First Series) ===
- 1878 Max Müller On the Religions of India (inaugural)
- 1879 Peter le Page Renouf The Religion of the Egyptians
- 1880 Ernest Renan Lectures on the Influence of the Institutions, Thought And Culture of Rome on Christianity And the Development of the Catholic Church
- 1881 T. W. Rhys Davids Indian Buddhism
- 1882 Abraham Kuenen National Religions and Universal Religion
- 1883 Charles Beard The Reformation of the Sixteenth Century in its Relation to Modern Thought and Knowledge
- 1884 Albert Reville The Native Religions of Mexico and Peru
- 1885 Otto Pfleiderer The Influence of the Apostle Paul on the Development of Christianity
- 1886 John Rhys Lectures on the origin and growth of religion as illustrated by Celtic heathendom
- 1887 Archibald Sayce Lectures on the Origin and Growth of Religion as illustrated by the Religion of the Ancient Babylonians
- 1888 Edwin Hatch Influence of Greek Ideas and Usages Upon the Christian Church
- 1891 Eugene, Count Goblet D'Alviella Lectures on the Origin and Growth of the Concept of God, as Illustrated by Anthropology and History ISBN 978-0-7661-0207-1
- 1892 Claude Montefiore The Origin and Growth of Religion as Illustrated by the Religion of the Ancient Hebrews
- 1893 Charles Barnes Upton Lectures on the bases of religious belief
- 1894 James Drummond Via, Veritas, Vita; Christianity in its most simple and intelligible form

=== 1900–1949 ===
- 1906 Franz Cumont (on Oriental Religions in Roman Paganism)
- 1908 William James A Pluralistic Universe
- 1911 Lewis Richard Farnell The Higher Aspects of Greek Religion
- 1912 James Hope Moulton Early Zoroastrianism
- 1913 Josiah Royce The Problem of Christianity, online edition (volume one)
- 1913 David Samuel Margoliouth The Early Development of Mohammedanism
- 1914 Herbert A. Giles Confucianism and Its Rivals
- 1916 Louis de La Vallée-Poussin The Way to Nirvána: Ancient Buddhism as a Discipline of Salvation
- 1916 Philip H. Wicksteed The reactions between dogma & philosophy illustrated from the works of S. Thomas Aquinas
- 1919 Joseph Estlin Carpenter Theism in Medieval India
- 1920 William Ralph Inge "The State, Visible and Invisible"
- 1921 James Moffatt The Approach to the New Testament
- 1922 Lawrence Pearsall Jacks Religious Perplexities
- 1923 Felix Adler The Reconstruction of the Spiritual Ideal
- 1924 Lawrence Pearsall Jacks Human consciousness towards God
- 1925 Francis Greenwood Peabody
- 1929 Sarvepalli Radhakrishnan An Idealist View of Life
- 1930 Rabindranath Tagore The Religion of Man
- 1931 George Dawes Hicks The Philosophical Bases of Theism
- 1932 Robert Seymour Conway Ancient Italy and Modern Religion
- 1933 Lawrence Pearsall Jacks The Revolt Against Mechanism
- 1934 Albert Schweitzer Religion in Modern Civilization
- 1936 William Ernest Hocking Living Religions and a World Faith
- 1937 Gilbert Murray Liberality and Civilisation

=== 1950–1999 ===
- 1959 Basil Willey Darwin And Butler: Two Versions of Evolution
- 1963 James Luther Adams
- 1964 Geoffrey Nuttall, Roger Thomas, Roy Drummond Whitehorn, Harry Lismer Short, The Beginnings of Nonconformity
- 1965 Frederick Hadaway Hilliard Christianity in education
- 1977 Jonathon Porritt, Bringing Religion Down to Earth
- 1979 Rustum Roy Experimenting with Truth
- 1989 Bede Griffiths, Christianity in the Light of the East

=== 2000–present ===
- 2003 James L. Cox Religion without God: Methodological Agnosticism and the Future of Religious Studies
- 2005 Karen Armstrong and Khalid Hameed Spirituality and global citizenship
