= Brian Hibbert =

British engineer (born 1947)

Brian Hibbert CBE
- Born: 1947 (age 78–79)
- Citizenship: British
- Education: University of Hertfordshire
- Known for: engineering
- Spouse: Penny
- Children: Oliver, Claire, Jessica and Andrew
- Awards: Commander of the Most Excellent Order of the British Empire
- Scientific career
- Fields: Aerospace and Defense
- Workplaces: Rolls-Royce Limited; Hunting Engineering; INSYS; Lockheed Martin

Brian Hibbert CBE (born 1947) is a British engineer. He is best known for his leadership of high-tech, commercial enterprises in the aerospace and defense industry.

Hibbert began his career as an engineer with Rolls-Royce Limited where he attained chartered engineer status. From 1974 to 1991, he was an engineer and project manager at Hunting Engineering, and from 1993 to 2001 he was managing director. Hunting Engineering was acquired by INSYS in 2001, where Hibbert continued as Managing Director. He retired as Managing Director from Lockheed Martin in 2007 after they acquired INSYS in 2006.

After retirement, Hibbert has spent his time promoting investment in small and medium enterprise.

Hibbert is a Chartered Engineer and a Fellow of the Society of Environmental Engineers. In 2004 he was invested as a Commander of the Most Excellent Order of the British Empire.
