= Hilbert (surname) =

Hilbert is a surname, and may refer to:

- Andy Hilbert (born 1981), American ice hockey player
- Angelika Hilbert (born 1942), German diver
- Anton Hilbert (1898–1986), German politician
- Auguste Hilbert (1889–1957), Luxembourgish bobsledder
- Carl Aage Hilbert (1899–1953), Danish Prefect of the Faroe Islands
- David Hilbert (1862–1943), German mathematician
- Dirk Hilbert (born 1971), German politician
- Donna Hilbert (born 1946), American writer
- Egon Hilbert (1899–1968), Austrian opera and theatre director
- Ernest Hilbert (born 1970), American composer and writer
- Frederic Hilbert (1912–2014), American politician
- Georges Hilbert (1900–1982), French sculptor
- Harvey Hilbert (born 1947), American army veteran and psychotherapist
- Jaro Hilbert (1897–1995), Slovenian painter
- Jaroslav Hilbert (1871–1936), Czech dramatist and writer
- Jon Hilbert (born 1975), American football player
- Jonathan Hilbert (born 1995), German racewalker
- Kyle Hilbert (born 1994), American politician from Oklahoma
- Lukas Hilbert, birth name of Lukas Loules (born 1972), German musician
- Martin Hilbert (born 1977), American social scientist and academic
- Morton Hilbert (1917–1998), American environmentalist
- Paul John Hilbert (1949–2001), American politician from Texas
- Rachel Hilbert (born 1995), American model
- Racquel Hilbert, Canadian politician
- Roberto Hilbert (born 1984), German footballer
- Rodrigo Hilbert (born 1980), Brazilian television presenter and actor
- Stephen Hilbert, American mathematician
- Vi Hilbert (1918–2008), Native American tribal elder
