= Jack Hibbert (footballer) =

English footballer

Personal information
- Full name: John Salmon Hibbert
- Date of birth: 12 March 1870
- Place of birth: Darwen, England
- Date of death: 4 September 1941 (aged 71)
- Place of death: Minneapolis, Minnesota
- Position: Outside forward

Senior career*
Years	Team	Apps	(Gls)
1888–1889	Burnley	1	(0)
- * Club domestic league appearances and goals

John Salmon Hibbert (12 March 1870 – 4 September 1941) was an English professional footballer who played as an outside forward. Born in Darwen, Lancashire, he was playing local junior football when he was signed by Football League side Burnley in May 1888. He played his only League match for Burnley on 27 October 1888 at Trent Bridge, Nottingham, then home of Notts County. Hibbert played outside-right in place of Alec Brady who had moved to inside-right. Despite kicking into the wind County were 2 up in eleven minutes. Later in the first-half County thought they had gone three up but their "goal" was ruled off-side. The second-half started hopefully for Burnley. The County goalkeeper Jack Holland was injured and Burnley winger Jack Yates made it 1–2. However ten minutes into the half County had re-established their two-goal lead. Burnley slumped as the match wore on and lost 1–6.

Hibbert left Burnley in 1889. He emigrated in 1906 and settled in Minnesota, where he married Birdie May Krause in 1926. He died in 1941 in Minneapolis, aged 71.
