= James Main (botanist) =

Scottish botanist

James Main (1775? – 1846) was a Scottish botanist who began his working life as a gardener in the neighbourhood of Edinburgh.

== Career ==
Main's botanical career began when he was employed by George Hibbert, who despatched him to China to collect plants. Main also collected for Gilbert Slater of Essex, and is credited with the introduction of the Chinese elm Ulmus parvifolia in 1794. Some years later, Main turned to farming in Scotland, but was unsuccessful. A horticultural autodidact, he made a living as a writer, submitting frequent papers on horticultural and agricultural practice to the principal periodicals of the day, progressing to books. He also edited, amongst others, new editions of Mawe's Every Man his own Gardener.

Main was elected an Associate of the Linnean Society in 1829. He died at Chelsea, London, in 1846 'at an advanced age'

== Publications ==
- The Villa and Cottage Florists' Directory. (1830 & 1835), London: Whittaker & Co. Republished 2008 by Forgotten Books, London. ISBN 9780559685088
- Illustrations of Vegetable Physiology, practically applied. (1833). London: William Orr.
- Popular Botany. (1835). London: Orr and Smith.
- The Young Farmer's Manual. (1839). London: Ridgway. Republished 2016 by Wentworth Press ISBN 9781371794163
- The Forest Planter's and Pruner's Assistant. (1839). London: Ridgway
