= Hibbert (ship) =

Several vessels have been named Hibbert, Hibberts, or George Hibbert.

== Hibberts (1784 ship) ==
- Hibberts (1784 ship) was launched in 1784 on the Thames as a West Indiaman. The first two times that French forces captured her the Royal Navy recaptured her. The second of these incidents, in 1804, gave rise to three court cases – an appeal to the Vice admiralty court at Halifax, Nova Scotia, a maritime insurance case that reached the United States Supreme Court, and one in London dealing with the labor contracts covering seamen. The French captured her for the third and final time in 1811. Hibberts was the model for the sculpture that adorned the western gate of the West India Docks, giving it the name "Hibbert Gate".

== George Hibbert (1803 ship) ==
- George Hibbert (1803 ship) was launched in 1803 at Newcastle-upon-Tyne. In 1815 and 1822 she rescued the crews of sinking vessels. In 1834 she made one voyage transporting female convicts to Van Diemen's Land. She was condemned as unseaworthy at Coringa on her way back to England via India.

== Hibberts (1818 ship) ==
- Hibberts was launched on 1 October 1818 at Whitby by Robert Barry, of Whitby, for John Barry & Co. She had a burthen of 439, or 44163/94 tons, was 112 ft 4 in (34.2 m) long, and had a beam of 30 ft 5 1/2 in (9.3 m). She transferred her registry to London in October 1820. Her crew abandoned Hibberts on 18 October 1830 in the Atlantic Ocean. She was on a voyage from Quebec City to London. Henry rescued the crew. Wind and currents finally drove Hibberts ashore 3 nautical miles (5.6 km) south of Porto, Portugal on 1 February 1831, wrecking her.
