= Hilbert (name) =

Hilbert is both a Germanic masculine given name and surname. Notable people with the name include:

Given name:

- Hilbert Leigh Bair (1894–1985), American World War I flying ace
- Hib Sabin (born 1935), American sculptor and educator; born Hilbert Sabin
- Hilbert Schauer (1920–2015), associate justice of the Colorado Supreme Court
- Hilbert Schenck (1926–2013), science fiction writer and engineer
- Hilbert Shirey (fl. 1980s–2010s), American poker player
- Hilbert van der Duim (born 1957), Dutch speed skater
- Hilbert Van Dijk (1918–2001), Australian fencer
- Hilbert Philip Zarky (1912–1989), American tax attorney

Surname:

- Hilbert (surname)
