= William Hibbert (cricketer) =

English cricketer

William John Hibbert (11 July 1873 – 6 June 1934) was an English cricketer active from 1900 to 1909 who played for Lancashire. He was born in Nottingham and died in Lincoln. He appeared in 14 first-class matches as a left-handed batsman. He scored 445 runs with a highest score of 79 and held six catches. He took three wickets with a best analysis of two for 41.
