= Hibbert, Purrier and Horton =

English merchant and shipping business

Hibbert, Purrier and Horton was a London-based merchant and shipping business, initially founded in 1770, which was also extensively involved in the slave trade during the late 18th and early-mid-19th century. A partnership (its personnel and name changed several times), it was the primary trading vehicle for successive generations of the Hibbert family's business interests in the West Indies.

== Origins ==
Manchester-based linen draper Robert Hibbert (1684–1762) had three sons, two of whom settled in Jamaica and established extensive sugar plantations: Thomas Hibbert (1710–1780) travelled to Jamaica in 1734; John Hibbert (1732–1769) lived in Jamaica from 1754 until his death. The third son, Robert (1717–1784), succeeded his father as manager of the Manchester business.

Several of Robert Jr's sons also joined the family business, with Thomas Hibbert (1744–1819) entering into partnership with London merchants John Purrier and Thomas Horton in 1770. His brother, a third generation Robert Hibbert (1750–1835) also joined the partnership, as did, in 1780, George Hibbert (1757–1837) who eventually rose to head the firm, which had offices at 9 Mincing Lane.

=== Changes of name ===
Reflecting the changing personnel involved, with sometimes more than one partnership, business was conducted under various names including:

- Hibbert, Purrier and Horton (1772–1781)
- Hibbert, Fuhr and Hibbert (1791–1799)
- Hibbert, Fuhr and Co (1800–1802)
- Hibbert, Fuhr and Purrier (1802–1818)
- Geo, Rob, Wm Hibbert (1804–1805)
- Geo, Rob, Wm and Sam Hibbert (1811–1818)
- G W S Hibbert and Co (1820–1838)
- Hibbert and Co (1839–1863)

Various fourth generation Hibbert sons were also engaged in the business, as was John Purrier's son, John Vincent Purrier (1773–1833), and grandsons Edward Purrier (1802–1858), John Vincent Purrier (died 1849) and (almost certainly) Thomas Purrier (c. 1809 – 1873).

== Company ships ==
The company's vessels included the merchantman Mary Ann. In July 1772, Maurice Suckling arranged for his nephew Horatio Nelson to sail to the West Indies in the Hibbert, Purrier and Horton merchantman, captained by John Rathbone, giving Nelson his first experience of seamanship and life at sea (he sailed from Medway, Kent, on 25 July 1771 sailing to Jamaica and Tobago, returning to Plymouth on 7 July 1772).
