= The Hibbert Journal =

The Hibbert Journal was a large, quarterly magazine in softback book format, issued since 1902 by the Hibbert Trust, best described by its subtitle: A Quarterly Review of Religion, Theology and Philosophy. In the early years it was published by Williams and Norgate, 14 Henrietta Street, London, with the U.S. Agent being Sherman, French & Co,. 6 Beacon Street, Boston, Mass. The subscription c. 1911 was "Ten Shillings per annum, post free". It ceased publication in 1968.

== Key figures ==
The Hibbert Journal was, from October 1902 to January 1948, edited by L. P. Jacks. Philosopher Dawes Hicks assisted him as sub-editor from its beginnings until his death in 1941.

A number of eminent people contributed to the production of the Journal; Knights and Lords, professors, philosophers, senior clergy and academics:

- Professor William James
- Sir Oliver Lodge
- C.W Stubbs, Bishop of Truro
- Sir Edward Russell of Liverpool
