= Robert Hibbert (cricketer) =

English cricketer

Robert Hibbert (25 October 1812 – 18 December 1833) was an English cricketer with amateur status who was active in 1832. He was born in Cambridge and died in Madeira. He made his debut in 1832 and appeared in two matches, which were on 22 and 29 May, as an unknown handedness batsman whose bowling style is unknown, playing for Cambridge University Cricket Club. He scored ten runs with a highest score of 5 and took two wickets. He was educated at Eton and King's College, Cambridge.

== Bibliography ==
- Haygarth, Arthur (1996) [1862]. Scores & Biographies, Volume 1 (1744–1826). Kennington: Frederick Lillywhite. ISBN 978-19-00592-23-9.
- Haygarth, Arthur (1997) [1862]. Scores & Biographies, Volume 2 (1827–1840). Kennington: Frederick Lillywhite. ISBN 978-19-00592-23-9.
