= Hibbert Trust =

The Hibbert Trust is a foundation associated with British Unitarianism from its inception in 1853. It was founded by Robert Hibbert (1769–1849) and originally designated the Anti-Trinitarian Fund. It awards scholarships and fellowships, supports the Hibbert Lectures, and maintained (from 1894) a chair of ecclesiastical history at Manchester College. From 1902 to 1968 it issued The Hibbert Journal.

== Foundation ==
On 19 July 1847, Hibbert executed a deed conveying to trustees $50,000 in 6% Ohio stock, and £8,000 in railway shares. The trustees, on the death of his widow, were to apply the income 'in such manner as they shall from time to time deem most conducive to the spread of Christianity in its most simple and intelligible form, and to the unfettered exercise of the right of private judgment in matters of religion'. The trustees were always to be laymen. Appended was a scheme for the administration of the trust, which the trustees were empowered to revise, and were directed to revise at least once in every twenty-five years.

In the original scheme the trust was called 'the Anti-trinitarian Fund', and its object was, by a provision of divinity scholarships, to encourage learning and culture among unorthodox Christians. The breadth of the actual trust is largely due to the counsels of Hibbert's solicitor, Edwin Wilkins Field, but, in opposition to Field, Hibbert 'determined on insisting that all recipients should be hetero-dox', his intention being 'to elevate the position and the public influence of the unitarian ministry'.

== Activities ==
It has always been known that the trust was founded with a fortune made from slavery; Robert Hibbert owned plantations in Jamaica, worked by enslaved African people. When the British government abolished chattel slavery throughout most of the Empire in 1833, it awarded compensation money to the slave owners. This money passed from Robert Hibbert to his widow, who died in 1853; the couple were childless and their legacy created the Hibbert Trust.

"On the 100th anniversary of Robert Hibbert's death [i.e. 1949], it was acknowledged in the Hibbert Journal that good things are often “gathered from soil dunged deep with human suffering”, " according to the current chair of trustees. In the 2020s, the trustees approached the Centre for Reparation Research at the University of the West Indies, seeking advice on a way forward.

== Trustees ==
Robert Mortimer Montgomery, who became a member of the Hibbert Trust in 1914, served as its Chairman from 1929 until three weeks before his death, in 1948.

== Hibbert Scholars ==
- R. Travers Herford
- Alexander Gordon
