= William Hibbert (planter) =

English planter and slave trader (1759–1844)

- Born: 1759; Manchester, England
- Died: 4 August 1844 (aged 84–85); London, England
- Occupation: West Indian Merchant
- Known for: Planter, slave trader, merchant
- Notable work: Hare Hill
- Children: 8: William Tetlow Hibbert
- Relatives: George Hibbert (brother)

External image
- Portrait of William Hibbert at the National Trust

William Hibbert (1759 – 1844) was an English planter, slave trader and merchant. He was the sixth son of Robert Hibbert (1717–1784) and Abigail Scholey. With his brother George Hibbert and cousin Robert Hibbert (1769–1849), William was a partner in the West Indian merchant house Geo. Rob. & Wm. Hibbert. The firm was involved in the slave trade and principally with the shipping, insurance and distribution of sugar from the West Indies.

== Life and career ==
Hibbert was born in Manchester in 1759, and baptised on 22 September 1759 at Cross Street Presbyterian Church. In the 1780s he moved to Jamaica to work in his uncle's slave factorage business in Kingston, Jamaica, where his brothers Robert and Thomas were already working. He was thought to be in Jamaica from 1781 to 1782 but found it to be not to his liking. In 1782, Hibbert won £20,000 (or a share of it) in a benefit lottery, and returned to England, where he continued working in the London branch of the family business. Hibbert married Elizabeth [Betty] Greenhalgh in 1784 at St Mary's Church, Manchester. Elizabeth was the daughter and co-heir of Robert Greenhalgh of Bolton-le-Moors (the other co-heir was her sister Mary, who married William Hibbert's brother Samuel). They had eight children (three sons, five daughters). In 1797 he purchased land from the Leicester family and built the country estate Hare Hill. On his death in 1844 the house passed to his eldest son William Tetlow Hibbert, who had joined the merchant house and went on to a successful commercial career of his own, including as a director of the Royal Exchange Assurance Corporation from 1851 to 1867.

By 1825, Hibbert's occupation was listed as "merchant", at W. & S. Hibbert, of 1 Billiter Court, City of London. Under the Slavery Abolition Act 1833 and the later Slave Compensation Act 1837, British slave-owners were paid compensation for the loss of slave labour. The Legacies of British Slave-ownership database shows thirteen claims with which Hibbert was involved, often as a mortgage holder with other family members. He and his brother George were compensated for the emancipation of over 1,000 slaves.

Hibbert lived at Crescent Grove, Clapham from 1810 until his death on 4 August 1844 and was buried in the churchyard at St Paul's Church, Clapham.

== Legacy ==
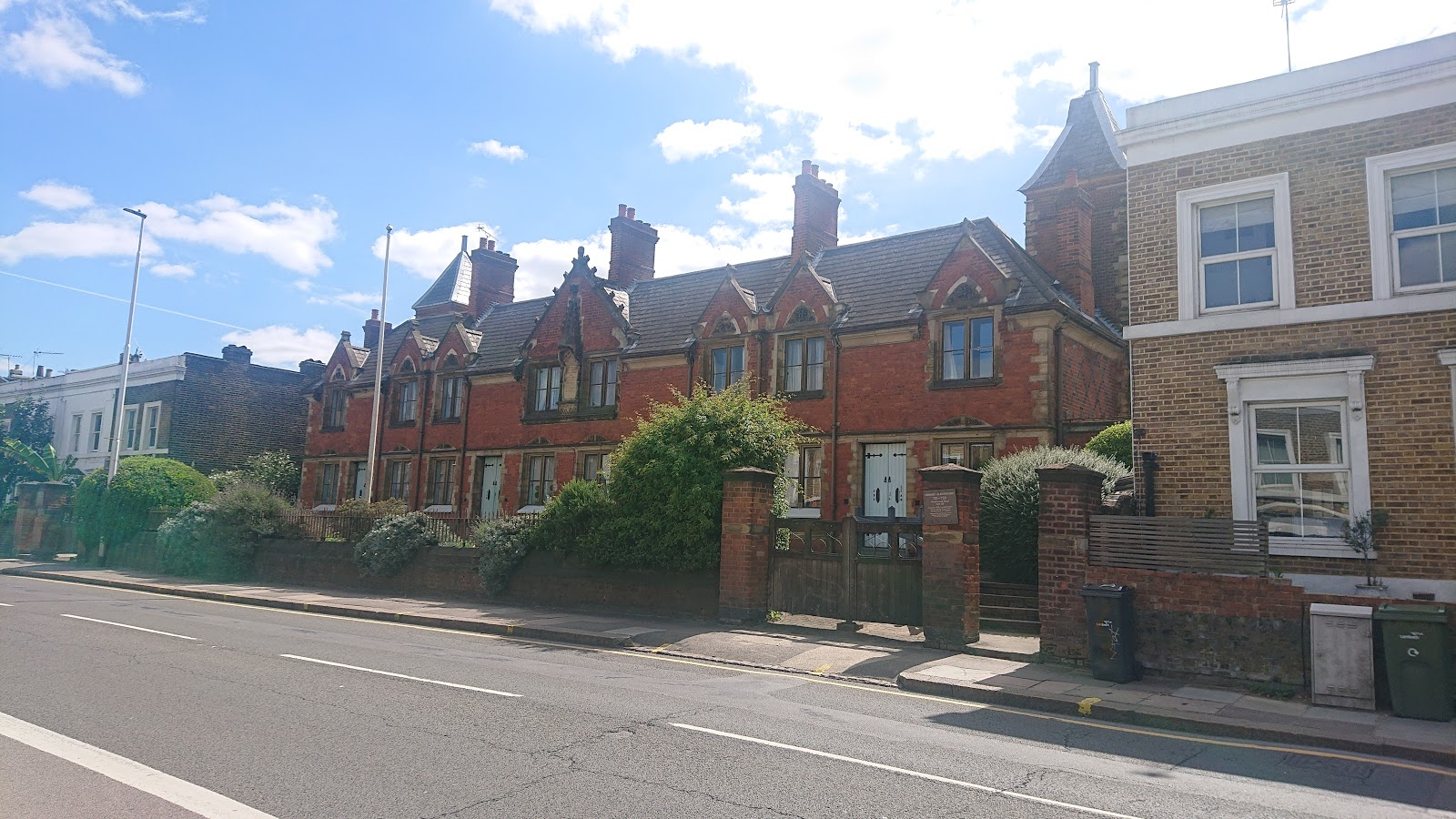
The eight Hibbert Almshouses in Wandsworth Road, London SW8

His estate was valued at more than £100,000, a legacy of his slave-ownership. Two of his daughters, Sarah and Mary Anne, commissioned an almshouse on Wandsworth Road, Clapham in his memory. The eight Hibbert Almshouses were built in 1859 to provide accommodation for older women from the parish of Clapham. The building has an inscription which reads;

These houses for eight aged women were erected by Sarah Hibbert and Mary Ann Hibbert in grateful remembrance of their father William Hibbert Esq. long an inhabitant of Clapham anno domini 1859.

The almshouses were designed by Edward I'Anson and are Grade II listed; they are considered to "have ensured that William's memory has been enshrined in the local area although it is unlikely that many people are now aware of his involvement with slavery".
