= Birtles Hall =

Country house in Cheshire, England

Coordinates: 53.26807°N 2.21330°W

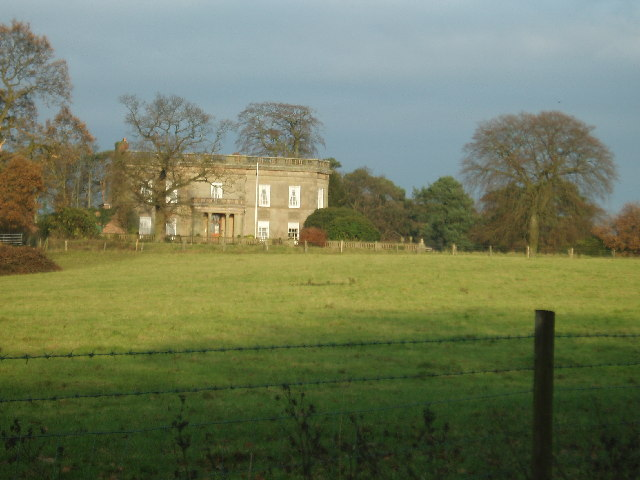
Birtles Hall

Birtles Hall is a country house in the parish of Over Alderley, Cheshire, England. It was built in about 1819 for the West Indies merchant Robert Hibbert.

The interior of the house was badly damaged by fire in 1938, and it was reconstructed by the Arts and Crafts architect James Henry Sellers. The exterior is constructed in buff ashlar sandstone. The roofs are of Welsh slate, and there are three brick chimneys. The house is in two storeys, with a south front of five bays. Along the top of the south front is a plain frieze and a cornice supporting a balustrade. Protruding from the central bay of the lower storey is a porch with Ionic columns and a balustrade. Figueirdo and Treuherz describe the style as "severe Neoclassical". The house is recorded in the National Heritage List for England as a designated Grade II listed building. Also listed Grade II are terrace walls in front of the house, and the stable block.

== See also ==
- Listed buildings in Over Alderley
