= George Hibbert =

English merchant, politician and ship-owner

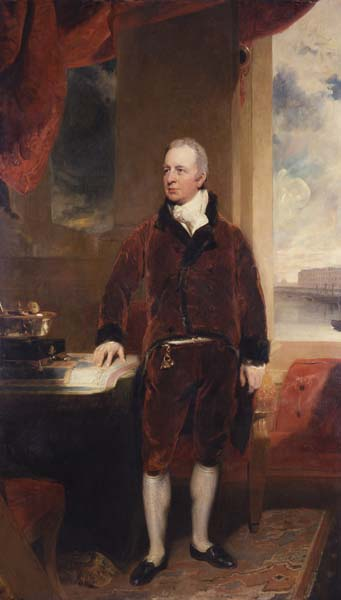
- Portrait of George Hibbert by Thomas Lawrence, 1811
- Born: 13 January 1757
- Died: 8 October 1837 (aged 80)
- Occupations: Merchant and politician
- Notable work: Helped to found the Royal National Lifeboat Institution

George Hibbert (13 January 1757 – 8 October 1837) was an English merchant, politician and ship-owner. Alongside fellow slaver Robert Milligan, he was also one of the principals of the West India Dock Company which instigated the construction of the West India Docks on London's Isle of Dogs in 1800. An amateur botanist and book-collector, he also helped found the Royal National Lifeboat Institution in 1824.

== Family background ==
Hibbert came from a family made rich from cultivating multiple sugar plantations in the West Indies. The Hibbert estates run by his uncle Thomas Hibbert were in Agualta Vale, Jamaica, including Hibbert House (currently the headquarters of the Jamaica National Heritage Trust); another uncle, John, had also settled in Jamaica.

George Hibbert was born in Stockfield Hall, Manchester, the son of Robert Hibbert and Abigail Hibbert (née Scholey). Around 1780 he went to London to join the West India trading house of Hibbert, Purrier and Horton (later Hibberts, Fuhr and Purrier) at 9 Mincing Lane. He eventually became head of the firm, described in 1800 as the 'first house' in the Jamaican trade. According to his biographer J. H. Markland, this was due to his "common sense, judgement and sagacity… [which] inspired confidence and respect."

Hibbert was an Alderman of London from 1798 to 1803. He was the first chairman of the West India Dock Company, which promoted the construction of the West India Docks from 1800 to 1802. He was Member of Parliament (MP) for Seaford in East Sussex from 31 October 1806 until 5 October 1812.

In 1812 George Hibbert was appointed agent-general for Jamaica at an annual salary of £1,500, a position he held until retiring in 1831.

In 1784, Hibbert married Elizabeth Margaret, the daughter of Philip Fonnereau, MP, a prominent Huguenot merchant and a director of the Bank of England; they had five sons and nine daughters. Their sons were: George (1792–1795), Nathaniel (1794–1865), George (1796–1882), Edward (1797–1824) and Henry Roberts (1806–1825). His son George was buried in the churchyard at St Paul's Church, Clapham, interred in a chest tomb shared with one of his brothers, William Hibbert; Hibbert was a trustee for the construction of the chapel at St Paul's, Clapham, in 1815.

Hibbert inherited Munden House near Watford from his wife's uncle, Rogers Parker, and removed there in 1829. He died at Munden on 8 October 1837, and was buried at Aldenham in Hertfordshire. His son Nathaniel inherited Munden on the death of his mother in 1841.

Hibbert's portrait was painted by Sir Thomas Lawrence in 1812 and by John Hoppner (c. 1800).

== Slave trade campaigner ==
The family counting house Hibbert, Purrier and Horton was extensively involved in the shipping and distribution of slave-produced goods, particularly sugar from Jamaica. As a result, (and also perhaps influenced by his wife's family connections to Huguenot Peter Isaac Thellusson, whose uncle, Sir Ralph Woodford, Governor of Trinidad, was a leading exponent of "free labour" from the East Indies), Hibbert became a leading member of the pro-slavery lobby, and acted as chairman of the Society of West India Merchants.

Shortly after William Wilberforce first raised the abolition of slavery in Parliament in May 1789, Hibbert spoke at a meeting of merchants at the London Tavern, seeking to demolish Wilberforce's speech with a 40-minute address entitled 'The Slave Trade Indispensable...'. He gave evidence to the committee of inquiry into the slave trade in 1790, arguing that abolition would ruin the West India interest, and stating that he annually imported produce worth between £200,000 and £250,000 and that he had heavily invested in Jamaica through loans to planters.

As an MP, from his maiden speech on 10 February 1807 onwards, he declared his utter hostility to the slave trade abolition bill on the grounds of the economic impact it would have on manufacturers in Manchester and Sheffield: "The Colonies would not exist without the African Trade. The Manchester & Sheffield Manufactories would instantly go to ruin & their people set a starving." (Note: "Manufactory" is an obsolete term for "factory"; see factory system and History of Manchester.) He gave three speeches to Parliament in 1807 during the slave trade debates which were later published. He wrote a pamphlet on the Slave Registry Bill in 1816.

It has been estimated that the Hibbert family was awarded £103,000 in compensation upon the ending of slavery in the Caribbean, with George Hibbert awarded £16,000.

== Botanist ==
Perhaps owing to his family's planting interests in Jamaica, Hibbert became interested in gardening and botany. A respected botanist and bibliophile, he was a founder of the London Institution in 1805 (vice-president in 1806) and elected a Fellow of the Royal Society in 1811. He was also a fellow of the Linnean Society and the Antiquarian Society of London.

According to Loudon, "The collection of heaths, Banksias, and other Cape and Botany Bay plants, in Hibbert's garden, was most extensive, and his flower-garden one of the best round the metropolis."

Hibbert funded various botanical expeditions, notably that of James Niven, an avid gardener and collector of plants, who was sent to the Cape region of South Africa in 1798. He remained for five years, sending home a 'valuable herbarium of native specimens' and new plants, including five new species of proteas – Hibbert's passion. Niven collected seeds of Nivenia corymbosa which were sent back and grown at Hibbert's Clapham estate in London. Another of Hibbert's employees, James Main, was despatched to China to collect for him. Hibbert's gardener, Joseph Knight, was reputedly one of the first people to propagate Proteaceae in England; the genus Hibbertia is named after Hibbert. Hibbert was also one of the first people to grow Hostas in Europe.

== Book collector ==
Hibbert lived for some years in London, dividing his time between a house in Portland Place and another, The Hollies, on the north side of Clapham Common in Clapham in south-west London, where he accumulated a considerable collection of books, including Gutenberg's Bible on paper (now at New York), the 1459 Psalter on vellum (now at The Hague) and the Complutensian polyglot, also on vellum (now at Chantilly). When he moved from London in 1829, his book collection was sold at auction raising the then princely sum of £23,000.

== Hibbert Gate ==
The Hibbert gate, situated at the western end of the West India Docks, was commissioned by Canary Wharf Group plc, and is a replica of the original gate that stood at the visitors' entrance to the West India Docks. The original 1803 gate was called the "Main Gate", but became known as the "Hibbert Gate" after the model of the ship that stood on top of it. The Hibbert of the model was a ship that George Hibbert had owned. The archway of the original gate, which had a pair of tall wrought-iron gates, was large enough to admit carts and wagons onto the quays. It became an emblem of the West India Docks and formed part of the arms of the Metropolitan Borough of Poplar. Hibbert Gate and its flanking walls were dismantled in 1932 as its narrow archway impeded traffic.

== RNLI ==
As a shipowner and chairman of the West Indies Merchants, Hibbert associated with philanthropist Sir William Hillary and Thomas Wilson, Liberal MP for Southwark, to help found the National Institution for the Preservation of Life from Shipwreck – an institution better known today as the Royal National Lifeboat Institution – on 4 March 1824.

Letters to and from Hibbert illustrate the roles he undertook; in certain instances of maritime misfortune he would donate his own money to help those affected. This was documented in 1825, whereby Thomas Edwards wrote to Hibbert 'to acknowledge the receipt of your donation of the 18th...and...to tell you that this sum of £200...has been dedicated amongst the persons harmed...agreeably to your directions.'

Hibbert's contributions to the Institution's early workings are detailed in his correspondence with other Committee members. For instance in 1829, after being presented with the case of a Mr J. M. Wright, whose efforts saw him save the lives of fourteen people, Hibbert wrote 'I by consent and with pleasure, agree to the award granted to Mr. Wright...for no better applicant I have encountered'. Hibbert's payment rewarded the 'brave, bold, athletic' Mr Wright for his efforts in saving lives, and to help him replace the equipment he lost at sea. On its website, the RNLI acknowledge Hibbert's input to the founding of the organisation, but few other secondary sources do the same.

== Notes ==
Parliament of the United Kingdom
Preceded by Richard Joseph Sullivan and John Leach	Member of Parliament for Seaford; 1806–1812; With: John Leach	Succeeded by Charles Rose Ellis and John Leach
