= Robert Hibbert (1717–1784) =

British merchant (1717 - 1784)

Robert Hibbert (1717 – 12 January 1784) was a British merchant in Manchester with commercial premises on King's Street.

Robert was one of three sons born in Cheshire to Robert Hibbert and Margaret Tetlow. His younger brother Thomas Hibbert (1710–1780) was the first family member to develop the family business interests in Jamaica, which included slave trading and sugar plantations. His other brother John (1732–1769) also lived in Jamaica, from 1754 until his death.

Robert married Abigail Scholey, with whom he had nine children: Anne Hibbert, Elizabeth Hibbert, John Hibbert (died 1770), Margaret Hibbert, Samuel Hibbert (died 1746), Thomas Hibbert (1744–1819; co-founder of family trading partnership, Hibbert, Purrier and Horton), Robert Hibbert (1750–1835), George Hibbert (1757–1837) and William Hibbert (1759–1844).

== Hibbert, Purrier and Horton ==
The family trading interests were managed through Hibbert, Purrier and Horton. Sons Robert, George and William were all partners in the firm in 1804.
