= Chorley, Alderley =

Civil parish in Cheshire, England

Coordinates: 53.308512°N 2.260117°W

Chorley
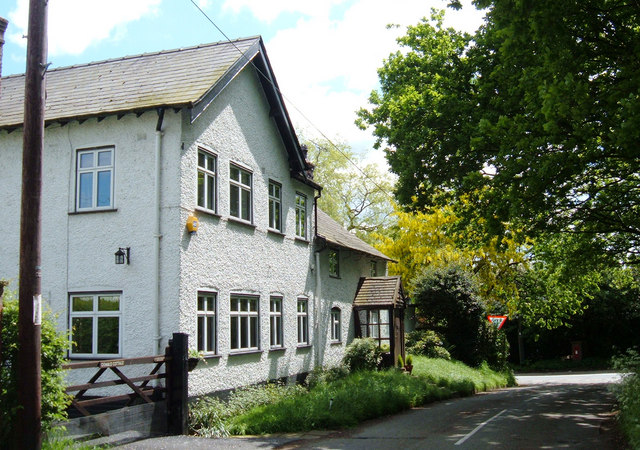
- Oswald Cottage, Chorley

- Location within Cheshire
- Population: 490 (Parish, 2021)
- OS grid reference: SJ827790
- Civil parish: Chorley
- Unitary authority: Cheshire East
- Ceremonial county: Cheshire
- Region: North West
- Country: England
- Sovereign state: United Kingdom
- Post town: ALDERLEY EDGE
- Postcode district: SK9
- Dialling code: 01565
- Police: Cheshire
- Fire: Cheshire
- Ambulance: North West
- UK Parliament: Tatton

Chorley is a civil parish in the borough of Cheshire East in Cheshire, England. The parish is named after the village of Chorley, which was renamed Alderley Edge during the 19th century. Alderley Edge was removed from the parish in 1894, since when the parish of Chorley has just covered the more rural western parts of the old parish. The largest settlement in the parish today is a hamlet called Row-of-Trees in the north of the parish. At the 2021 census, the parish had a population of 490.

== History ==
The first written evidence of the settlement, then known as 'Chorlegh', appeared in the 13th century, with the likely derivation coming from ceorl and leah, meaning a peasants' clearing. Although it is not mentioned in the Domesday Book, it is included in a charter of c.1280. In the 13th century and during the Middle Ages, the area comprised estates that had many different owners. From the 15th century, most of these farming estates came under the ownership of the de Trafford family. Chorley Old Hall was built in the 14th century.

In 1830 Chorley consisted of only a few cottages, the De Trafford Arms Inn, a toll bar, and a smithy, straggling along the road from Congleton to Manchester. The village grew rapidly following the opening of the Stockport to Crewe section of the Manchester and Birmingham Railway in 1842. The railway company offered free season tickets for 20 years to Manchester businessmen who built houses with a rateable value of more than £50 within a mile of the station. This season ticket was in the form of a small silver oval which could be worn on a watch chain. Alderley Edge railway station opened with the line in 1842 as 'Alderley'. Its name was changed to 'Alderley and Chorley' in 1853, before being renamed again to 'Alderley Edge' in 1876.

Chorley historically formed one of the four townships which made up the ancient parish of Wilmslow. From the 17th century onwards, parishes were gradually given various civil functions under the poor laws, in addition to their original ecclesiastical functions. In some cases, including Wilmslow, the civil functions were exercised by each township separately rather than the parish as a whole. In 1866, the legal definition of 'parish' was changed to be the areas used for administering the poor laws, and so Chorley became a civil parish.

In 1862, a Chorley local government district was created, governed by an elected local board. The district included the eastern part of the Chorley township around the village, but excluded the more rural western part of the Chorley township. The local government district was renamed Alderley Edge in 1894. Later that year, the Local Government Act 1894 converted local government districts into urban districts and directed that parishes could no longer straddle district boundaries. The part of the Chorley civil parish within Alderley Edge Urban District therefore became a separate parish called Alderley Edge, and the Chorley parish was reduced to cover just the more rural western part of the old parish. It kept the name Chorley despite no longer including the village after which it had been named.

== Governance ==
There are two tiers of local government covering Chorley, at civil parish and unitary authority level: Chorley Parish Council and Cheshire East Council. The parish council generally meets at Lindow Community Primary School on Upcast Lane.

== See also ==
- Listed buildings in Chorley, Alderley
