= Listed buildings in Chorley, Alderley =

Chorley, Alderley is a civil parish in Cheshire East, England. It contains three buildings that are recorded in the National Heritage List for England as designated listed buildings, all of which are at Grade II. This grade is the lowest of the three gradings given to listed buildings and is applied to "buildings of national importance and special interest". The parish is partly residential, but mainly rural. The listed buildings consist of former farmhouses and associated structures.

Name and location	Photograph	Date	Notes
Row of Trees Farm; 53.30855°N 2.26159°W	—	1607	Originally a farmhouse, this is timber-framed with brick and wattle and daub infill, and has a stone-slate roof. It is in two storeys, with a gabled wing to the left and a later extension to the right. There is another later wing at the rear. Inside the house is an inglenook with a chamfered bressumer.
Davenport House Farm; 53.30726°N 2.26165°W	—	Late 17th century	A brick house, originally a farmhouse, with a slate roof. It is in two storeys with an attic. The north front has three bays and a doorway. The south front is double-gabled, and has a porch. The windows are mullioned.
Gate piers, Davenport House Farm; 53.30743°N 2.26177°W	—	18th century	The gate piers stand to the north of the house. They are in brick with a square plan and have stone caps supporting stone balls.

== See also ==
- Listed buildings in Alderley Edge
- Listed buildings in Nether Alderley
- Listed buildings in Great Warford
- Listed buildings in Mobberley
- Listed buildings in Wilmslow
