= Alderley Edge =

Village and civil parish in Cheshire, England

Coordinates: 53.303°N 2.236°W

- village
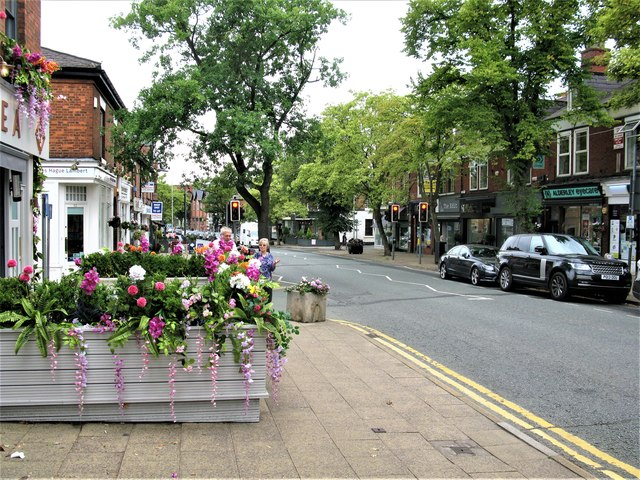
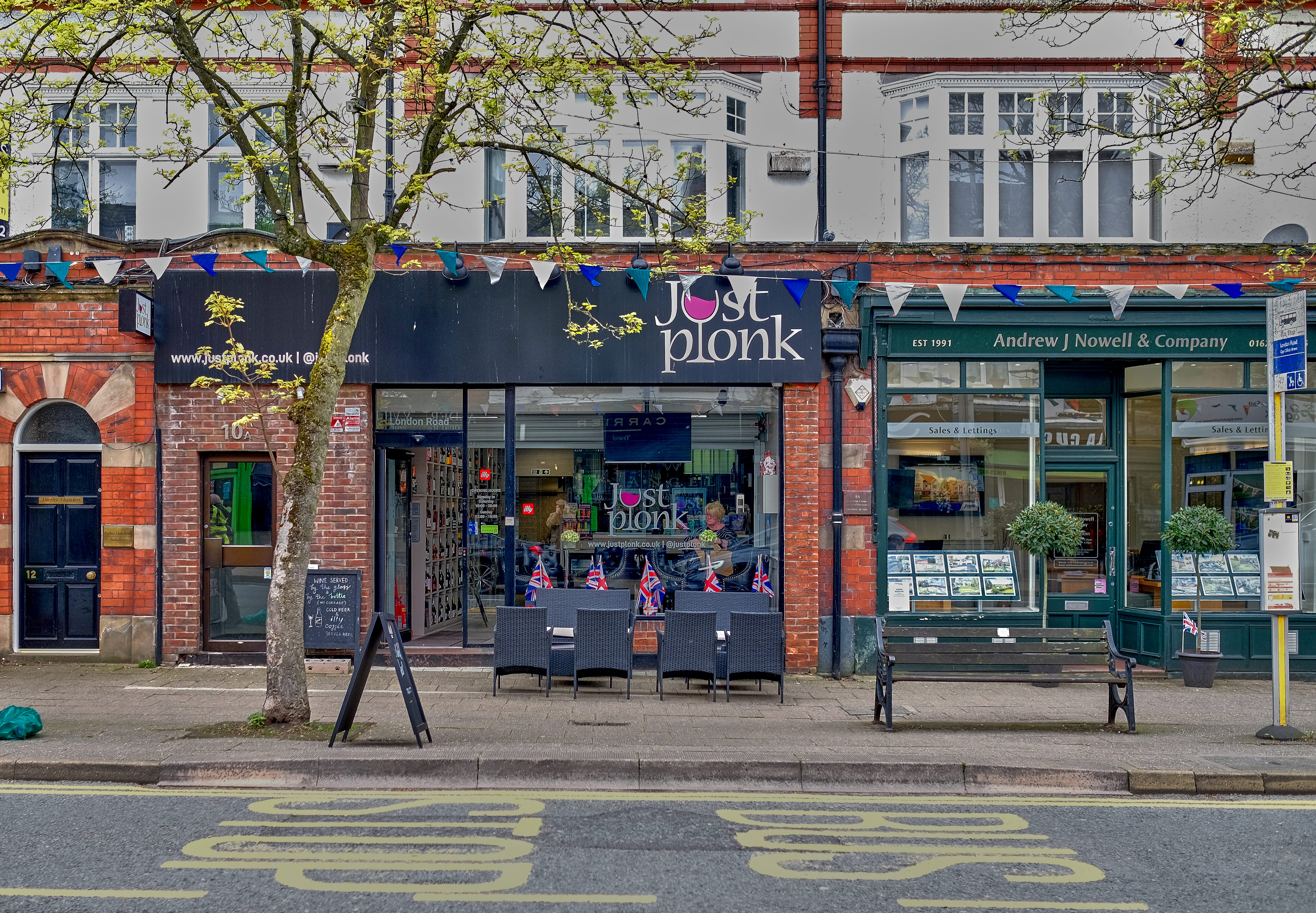
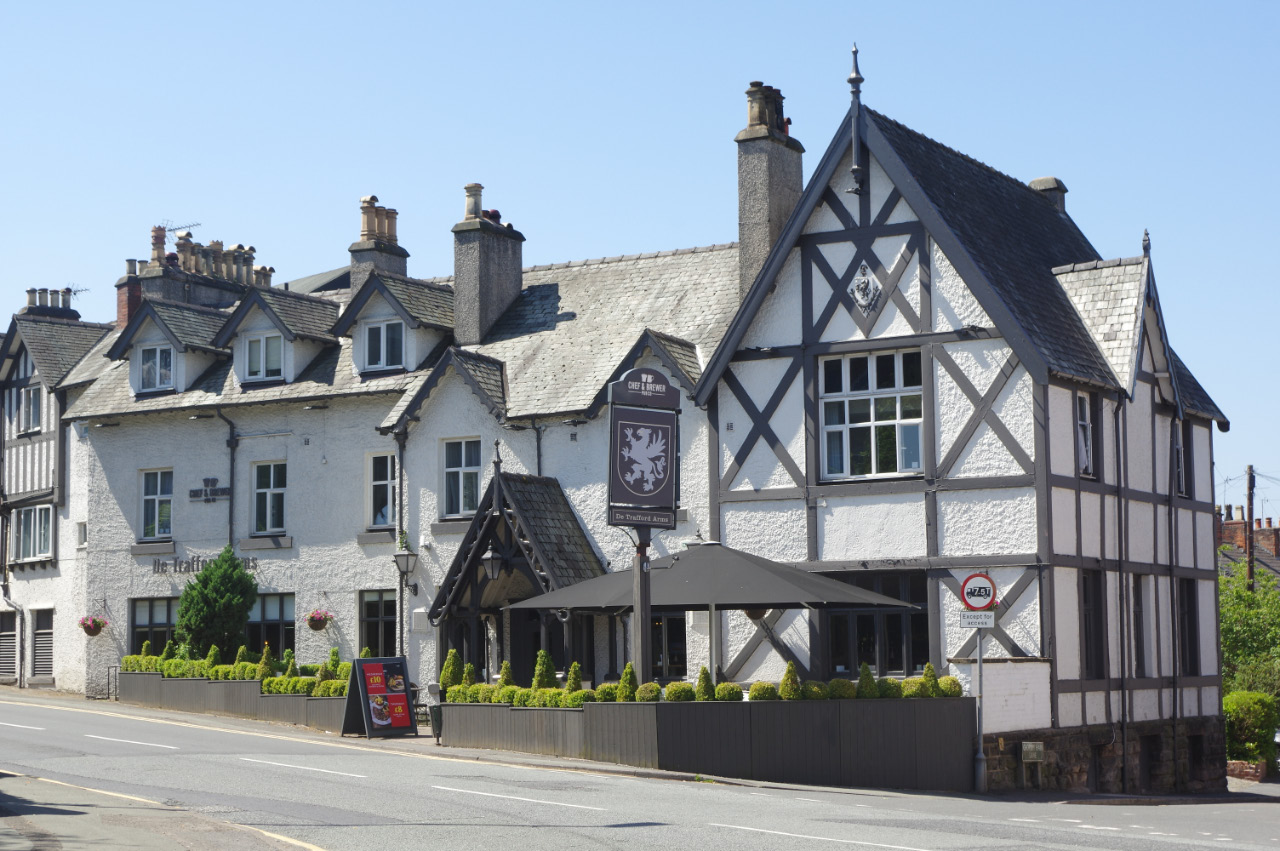
- Village Centre London Road De Trafford Arms

- Location within Cheshire
- Population: 4,777 (Parish, 2021)
- OS grid reference: SJ843785
- Civil parish: Alderley Edge
- Unitary authority: Cheshire East
- Ceremonial county: Cheshire
- Region: North West
- Country: England
- Sovereign state: United Kingdom
- Post town: ALDERLEY EDGE
- Postcode district: SK9
- Dialling code: 01625
- Police: Cheshire
- Fire: Cheshire
- Ambulance: North West
- UK Parliament: Tatton

Alderley Edge is a village and civil parish in Cheshire, England, 6 miles (10 km) north-west of Macclesfield and 12 miles (19 km) south of Manchester. It lies at the base of a wooded sandstone escarpment, The Edge, overlooking the Cheshire Plain. As of the 2021 census, its population was 4,777.

The village is known for its affluence, expensive homes and location within Cheshire's Golden Triangle. Its cafes and designer shops attract Premier League footballers, actors and businesspeople, making it one of the UK's most sought-after places to live outside London.

== History ==
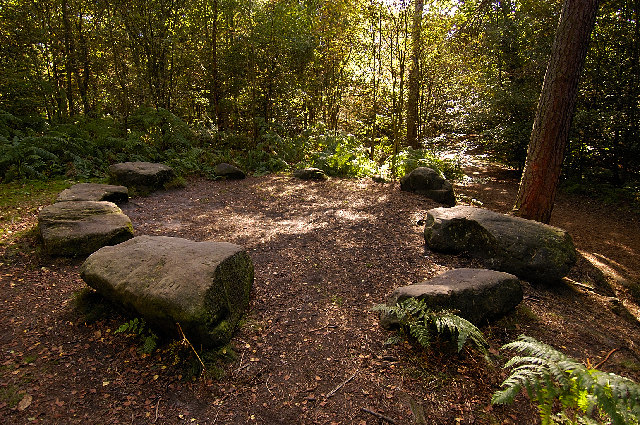
Druid's Circle on The Edge, a folly stone circle probably placed here in the 19th century

=== Early period ===
The Alderley Edge area shows signs of occupation since the Mesolithic period, with flint tools found along its sandstone outcrop. Evidence of Bronze Age copper mining has been identified to the south of the area. In 1995, the Derbyshire Caving Club uncovered a Roman coin hoard of 564 coins (dated AD 317–336), now housed in the Manchester Museum). There are 13 recorded sites in Alderley Edge, 28 in Nether Alderley, and 44 along the Edge in the County Sites and Monuments Record.

Early medieval settlements were documented in Nether Alderley, to the south of Alderley Edge. The first written record of Alderley Edge, then called Chorlegh (later spelt Chorley) dates back to the 13th century, likely derived from ceorl and lēah, meaning a "peasants' clearing". Although not in the Domesday Book, it appears in a c.1280 charter. The name Alderley, first recorded in 1086 as Aldredelie, likely derives from Aldred and leah meaning "Aldred's clearing" or from Old English Alðrȳðelēah meaning "the meadow or woodland clearing of a woman called Alðrȳð".

In the 13th century and Middle Ages, the area comprised multiple estates, mostly owned by the De Trafford baronets from the 15th century. The main manors were Chorley Old Hall, a 14th-century structure, and Nether Alderley's Old Hall, a 16th-century building destroyed by fire in 1779. Agriculture dominated the local economy, with Nether Alderley granted a market charter around 1253. Nether Alderley Mill dates back to 1391, although the present timber structure is 16th-century. The millpond was adapted to form the moat which surrounded the Old Hall, the home of the Stanley family. The corn mill continued to work until 1939 when Edward Stanley, 6th Baron Stanley of Alderley, was compelled to sell it, along with the rest of the Alderley Park estate, to meet the cost of death duties. In the 1950s the National Trust bought the site, restored the building and opened it to the public.

Cheshire had its own system of taxes in the mediaeval period, the Mize; in the records for 1405, Chorley was assessed at 20s 0d and Nether Alderley at 27s 0d.

=== 19th century ===
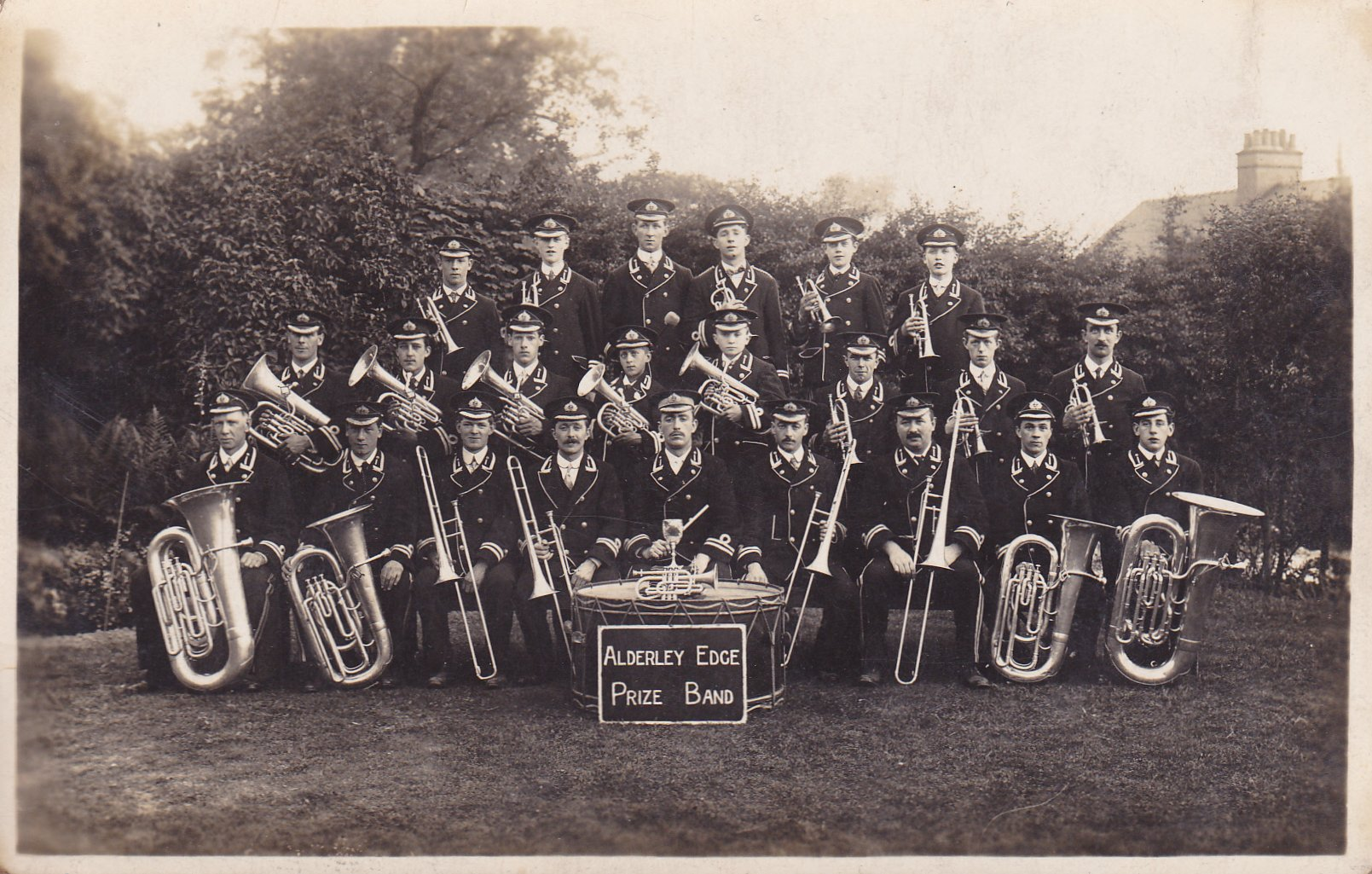
Alderley Edge Prize Band

In 1830, Chorley comprised a few cottages, the De Trafford Arms Inn, a toll bar, and a smithy scattered along the Congleton to Manchester Road. The arrival of the railway in 1842, part of the Manchester and Birmingham Railway, transformed the area. The railway company offered free 20-year season tickets to Manchester businessmen who built homes worth over £50 within a mile of the station. These tickets, small silver ovals worn on watch chains, encouraged development.

The railway station, initially called 'Alderley', was renamed 'Alderley and Chorley' in 1853 and later 'Alderley Edge' in 1876. After the railway's construction, Sir Humphrey de Trafford, owner of Chorley Hall, developed an estate with new roads and houses, most completed by 1910. The railway also boosted the village's popularity with day trips and excursions.

Several landmark buildings were established during this time, including St Philip's Church in 1853, Alderley Edge Community Primary School in 1854, and The Ryleys School for boys in 1877. Two all-girls schools were opened, St Hilary's in 1876 and Mount Carmel in 1945, which then merged in 1999 to form Alderley Edge School for Girls. The Mission Hall (later The Institute), built in 1878 for temperance meetings, and the Methodist Church, built in 1863, also date from this period.

Alderley Edge's population rose from 561 in 1841 to 2,856 by 1902, while Nether Alderley's fell from 679 to 522.

The 1871 Ordnance Survey map shows the village with the Queen's Hotel, shops, terraced houses and a post office. To the north were wooded areas with detached villas, while to the east, curving roads divided large wooded plots, some still undeveloped. The names "Brickfield" and "Brick Kiln" to the northeast suggest a local brick source. The 1899 map shows a similar layout but details individual villas like Holybank, Ashfield, and The Larches, along with remnants of old mines near Windmill Wood to the southeast.

=== 20th century ===
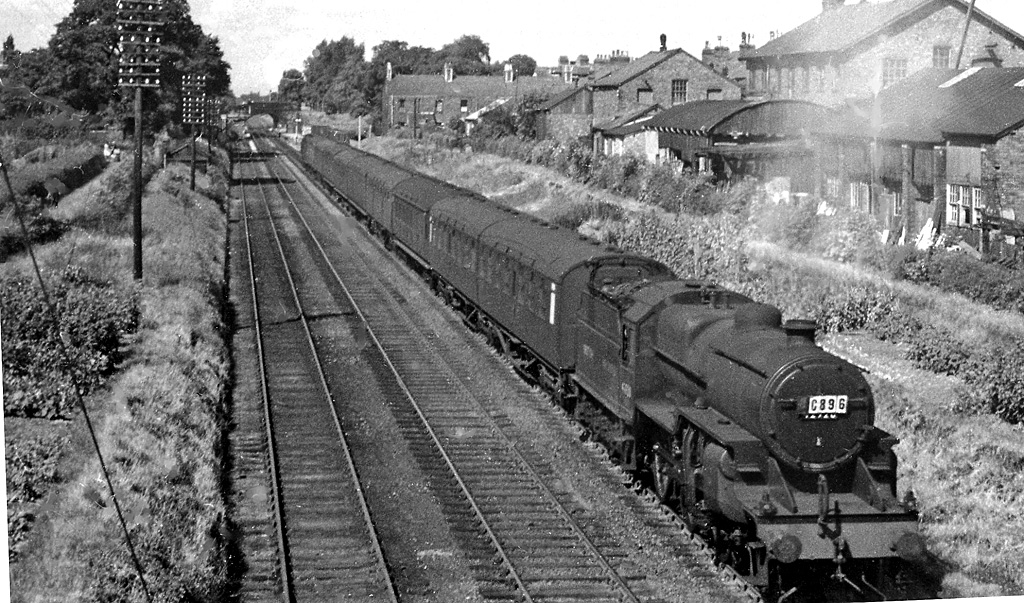
A passenger train passing Alderley Edge in 1951

In the 20th century, Alderley Edge expanded with post-war housing on its north-eastern and western edges, while Nether Alderley remained largely unchanged, aside from the sale of Alderley Park to AstraZeneca. The park is now managed by Bruntwood; it houses 150 science companies and commercial, residential and retail spaces.

In 1990s, several gold bars were found in Alderley, the first on Artists Lane. An inquest was held in February 1993 and it was declared not to be a treasure trove. John Cherry from the British Museum along with Adrian Tindall, the conservation officer for Cheshire County Council reported that the bar weighed 97.01 grams and was 73% gold. The publicity caused the public to search for more and five more gold bars were found.

== Governance ==
There are two tiers of local government covering Alderley Edge, at civil parish and unitary authority level: Alderley Edge Parish Council and Cheshire East Council. The parish council meets at Festival Hall on Talbot Road.

=== Administrative history ===
The settlement now known as Alderley Edge was historically called Chorley and was part of the ancient parish of Wilmslow in the Macclesfield Hundred of Cheshire. Wilmslow parish was divided into four townships: Bollin Fee, Chorley, Fulshaw, and Pownall Fee. Alderley parish, lying south of Chorley; consisted of three townships: Nether Alderley, Over Alderley, and Great Warford. From the 17th century, parishes gradually acquired civil functions under the poor laws, in addition to their original ecclesiastical functions. In some cases, including Wilmslow and Alderley, the civil functions were exercised by each township separately rather than the parish as a whole. In 1866, the legal definition of 'parish' was changed to be the areas used for administering the poor laws, and so Chorley and all the other townships became separate civil parishes, which therefore diverged from the ecclesiastical parishes.

In 1862, a Chorley local government district was established, governed by an elected local board, covering parts of Chorley, Bollin Fee and Fulshaw. The more rural western part of Chorley was excluded.

In 1894, the board renamed the district to Alderley Edge to avoid postal confusion with Chorley, Lancashire and became an urban district under the Local Government Act 1894. The 1894 Act also directed that civil parishes could no longer straddle district boundaries, and so the part of Chorley within the urban district became a separate parish called Alderley Edge, and the parts of Bollin Fee and Fulshaw within the urban district became a parish called Bollinfee. The reduced civil parish of Chorley outside the urban district kept the name Chorley, despite no longer including the village after which it was named.

The urban district expanded in 1910, gaining area from Nether Alderley and 1936, taking small areas from Wilmslow and Chorley. In 1974, Alderley Edge Urban District was abolished under the Local Government Act 1972, with a successor parish established covering the same area. District-level functions passed to Macclesfield Borough Council, and in 2009, Cheshire East Council took over as the Borough council and Cheshire County Council were both abolished.

Coat of arms of Alderley Edge Parish Council
Notes Granted 5 September 1974 Crest On a wreath of the colours upon a Red Sandstone Cliff Proper a griffin segreant Gules holding in the dexter forefoot a cresset Sable enflamed Proper. Escutcheon Argent on a bend Azure between two cross crosslets fitchy Sable a stag's head caboshed between two garbs Or. Motto In Praecipiti Stantem (Steadfast At The Edge) Badge A Stag's Head caboshed Or between the attires a Cresset issuant Sable enflamed proper.

== Economy ==
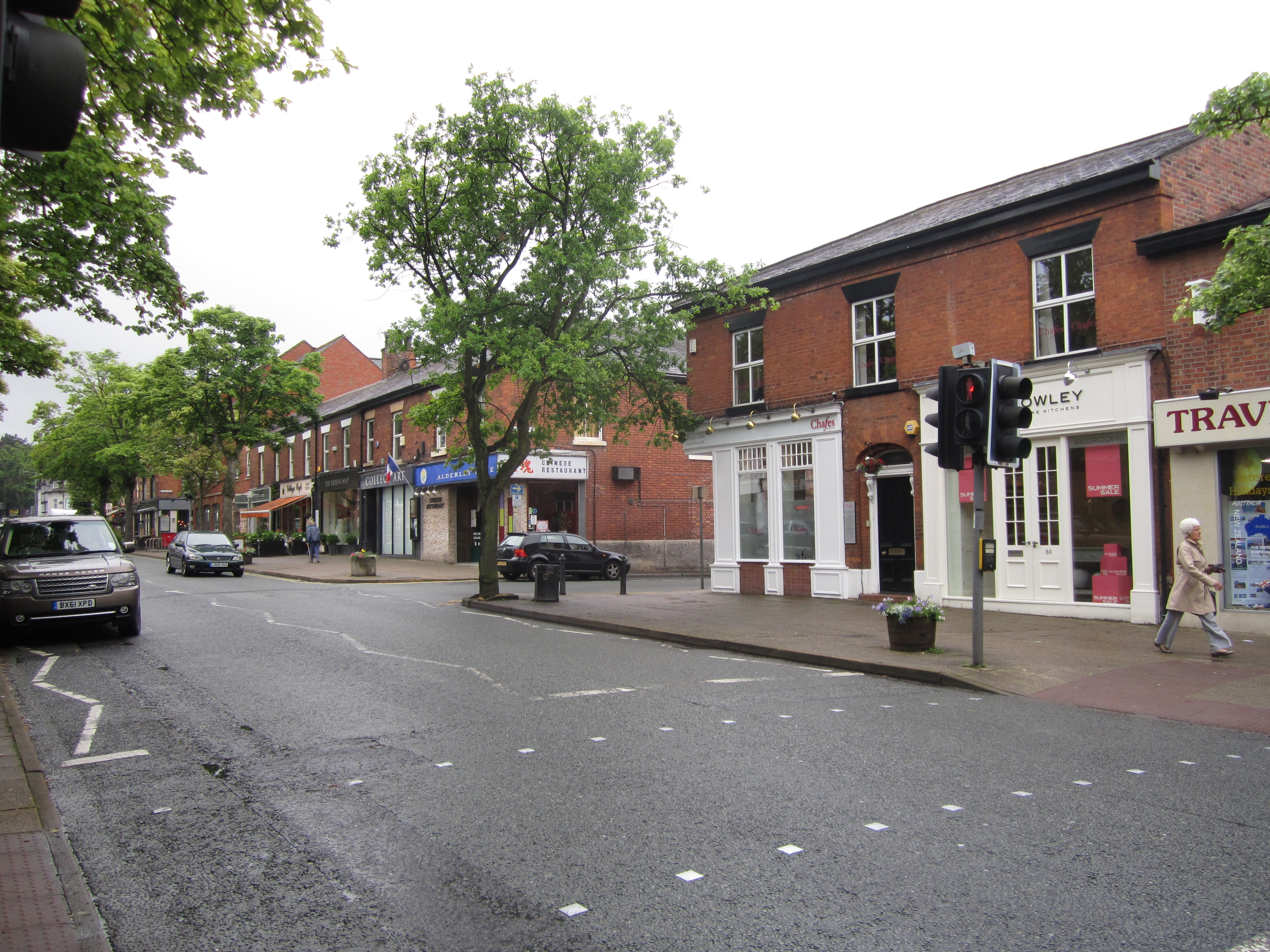
London Road

At the 2001 UK census, the ward had a possible workforce of approximately 2,157 people. The economic activity of residents in the Alderley Edge electoral ward was 36.9% in full-time employment, 10.2% in part-time employment, 29.3% self-employed, 1.7% unemployed, 1.4% students with jobs, 3.5% students without jobs, 19.3% retired, 7.5% looking after home or family, 2.8% permanently sick or disabled and 2.0% economically inactive for other reasons.

Alderley Edge has a very high rate of self-employment (29.3%) compared with rest of the Macclesfield borough (22.7%) and England (16.6%). It also has low rates of unemployment (1.7%) compared with the rest of the Macclesfield borough (2.0%) and England (3.3%). The Office for National Statistics estimated that, during the period of April 2001 to March 2002, the average gross weekly income of households in Alderley Edge was £720 (£37,440 per year).

== Landmarks ==
=== The Edge ===
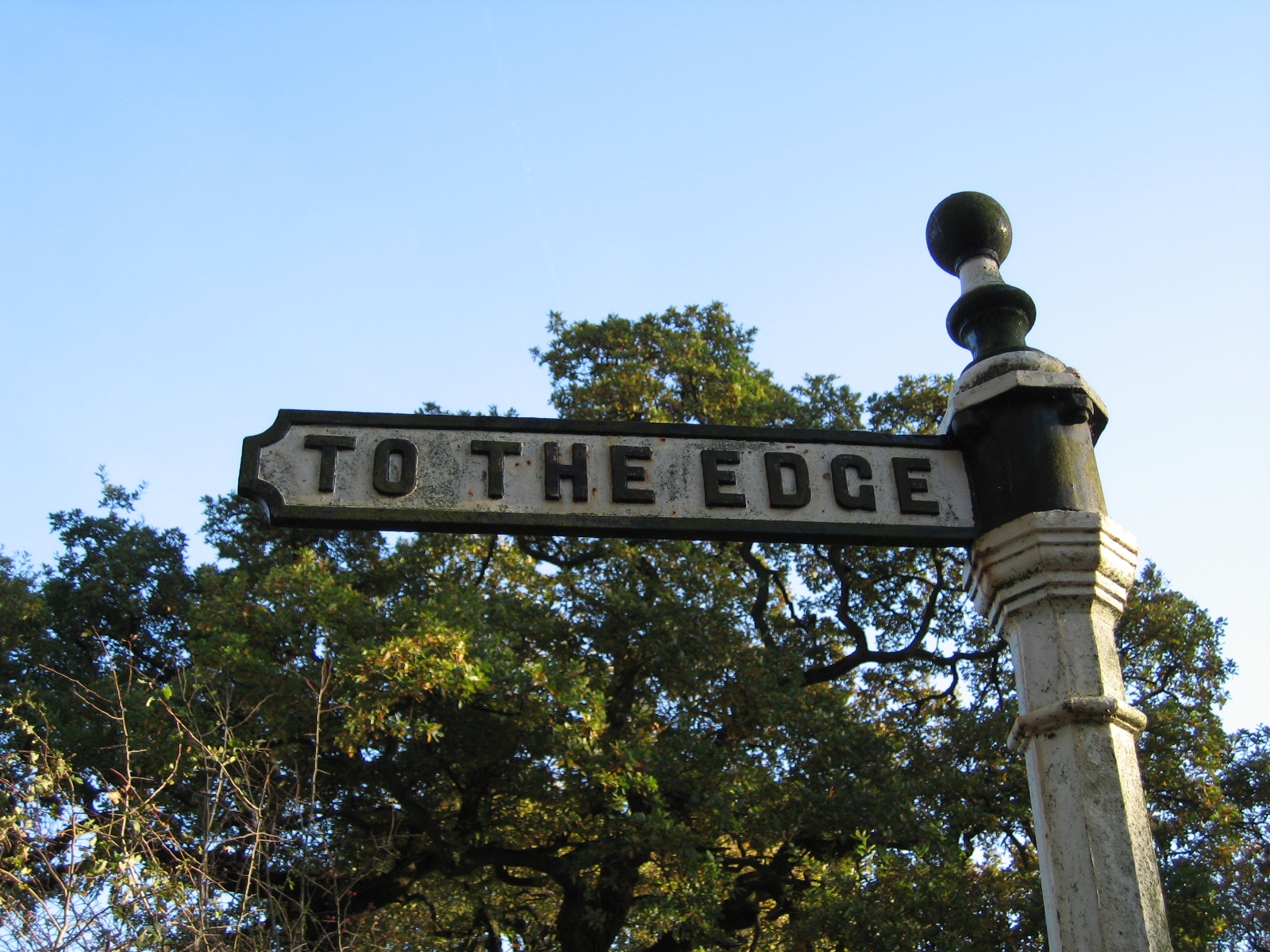
"To The Edge" sign

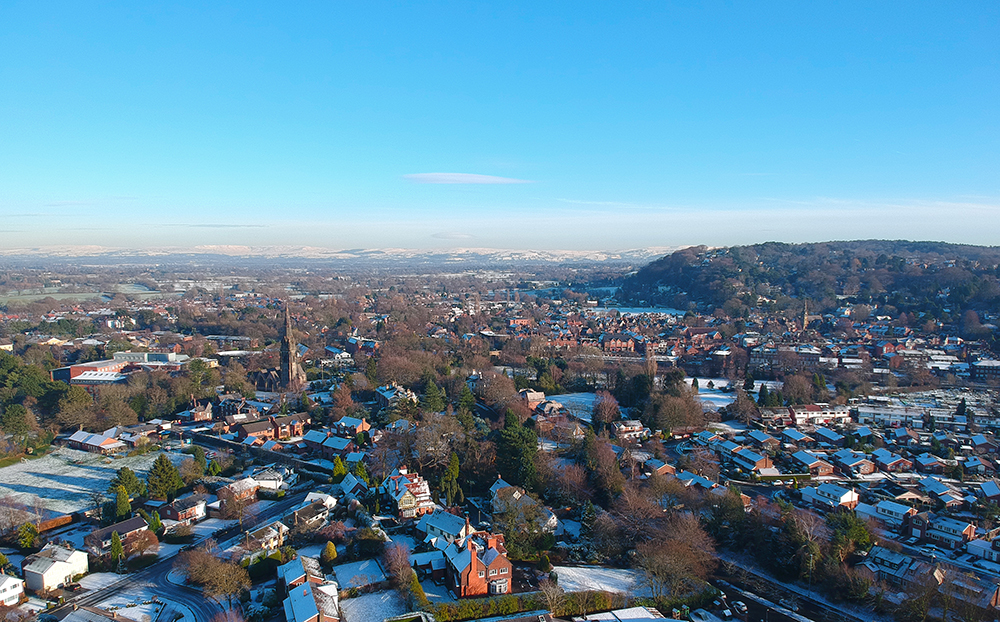
Aerial photograph of Alderley Edge showing escarpment overlooking the village

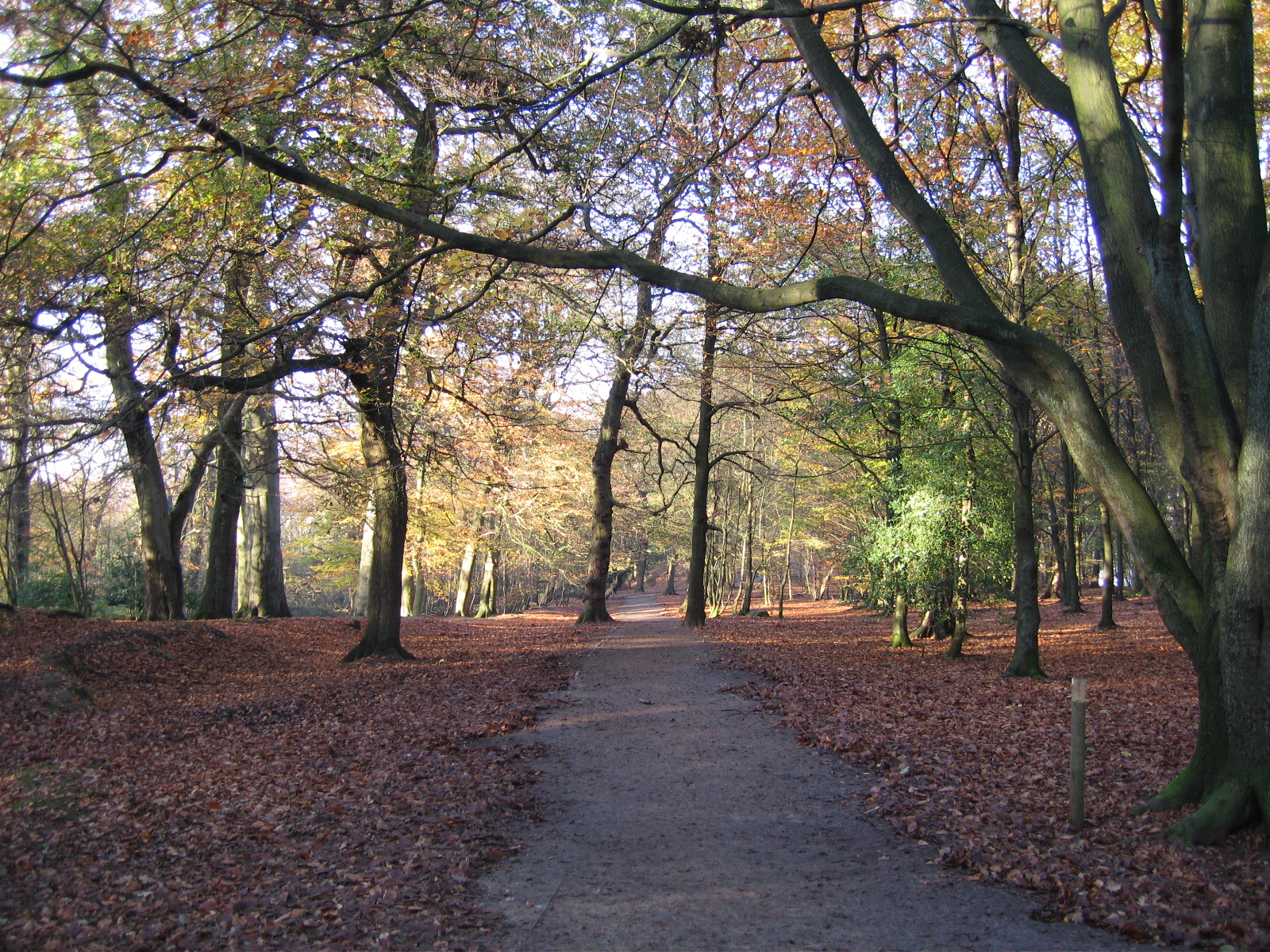
Woodland path on the Edge

The Edge is a wide red sandstone escarpment situated above the village of Alderley. An edge is used as a descriptive term for high land in Cheshire and adjacent counties. The Edge rises gradually from Macclesfield until, at a distance of 7 or 8 kilometres, it terminates abruptly, having reached a height of nearly 215 metres above sea level and 110 metres above the Cheshire Plain below it.

It was formed by weathering of resistant sandstone over layers and faulting. The northern side, shaped like a horse shoe or hough, gives its name to The Hough, a hamlet of scattered houses descending towards Alderley village.

Owned by the National Trust, it is a public access wooded area attracting 300,000 visitors annually from Manchester and the nearby towns of Wilmslow and Macclesfield. It features a car park, toilet facilities and is designated a Site of Special Scientific Interest for its unique geology. The woodland contains remnants of the old Alderley Edge Mines.

==== Views ====
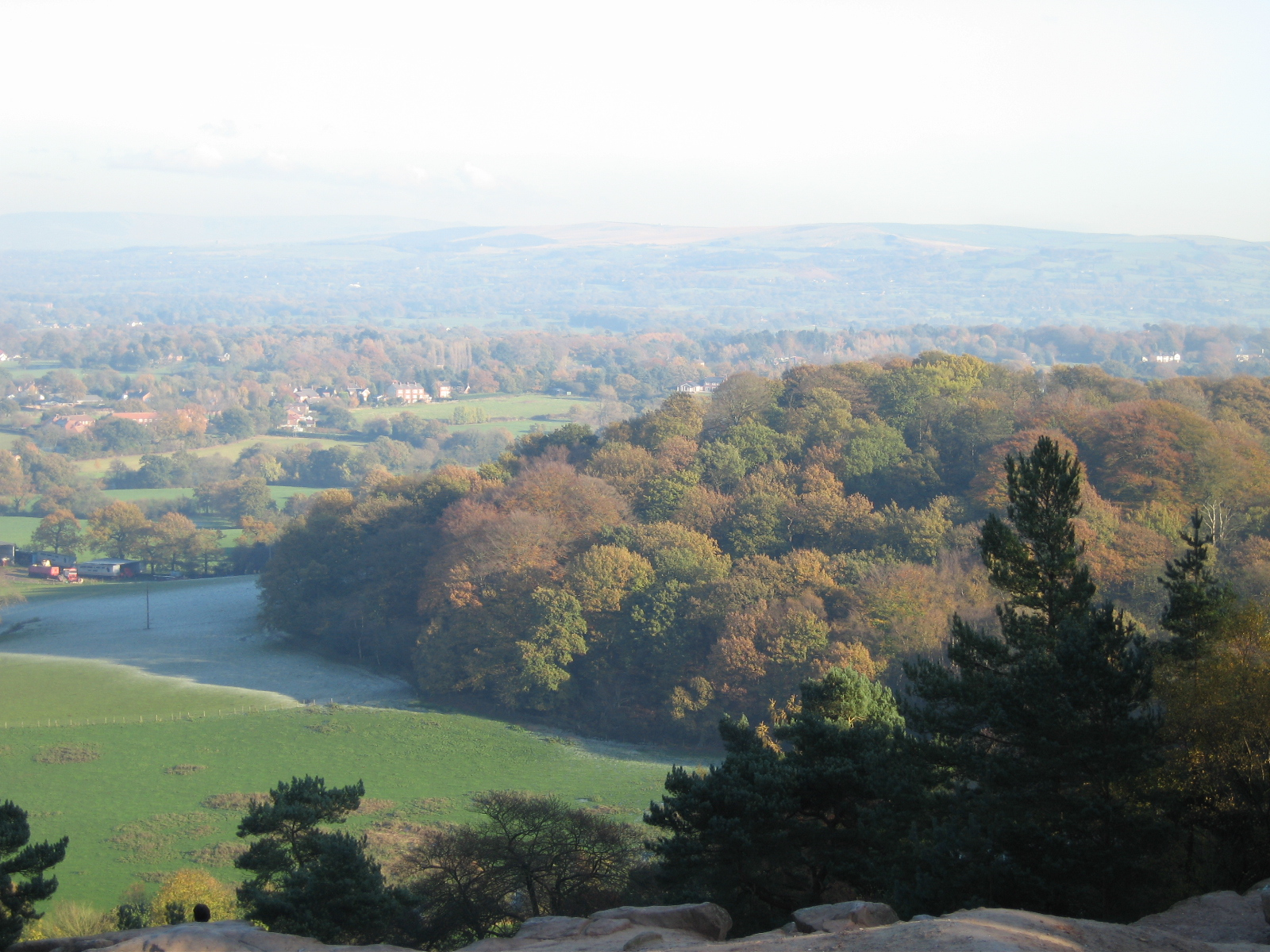
The view from Stormy Point over to the Pennines

The Edge offers views across Cheshire and the Peak District. The Cheshire Plain is visible, stretching from Macclesfield Forest in the south-east towards the Derbyshire peaks in the east, and north to Manchester and the Blackstone Edge in Yorkshire.

Hundreds of Scots pines were planted on the Edges by Sir James and Sir Edward Stanley, between 1745 and 1755. Before trees were planted, the Edge provided a full 360° panorama. Today, views are limited to the northerly and easterly directions. Trees obscure views of landmarks like the Wrekin in Shropshire; The Cloud near Bosley, Mow Cop and the mountains of North Wales.

=== Alderley Edge mines ===
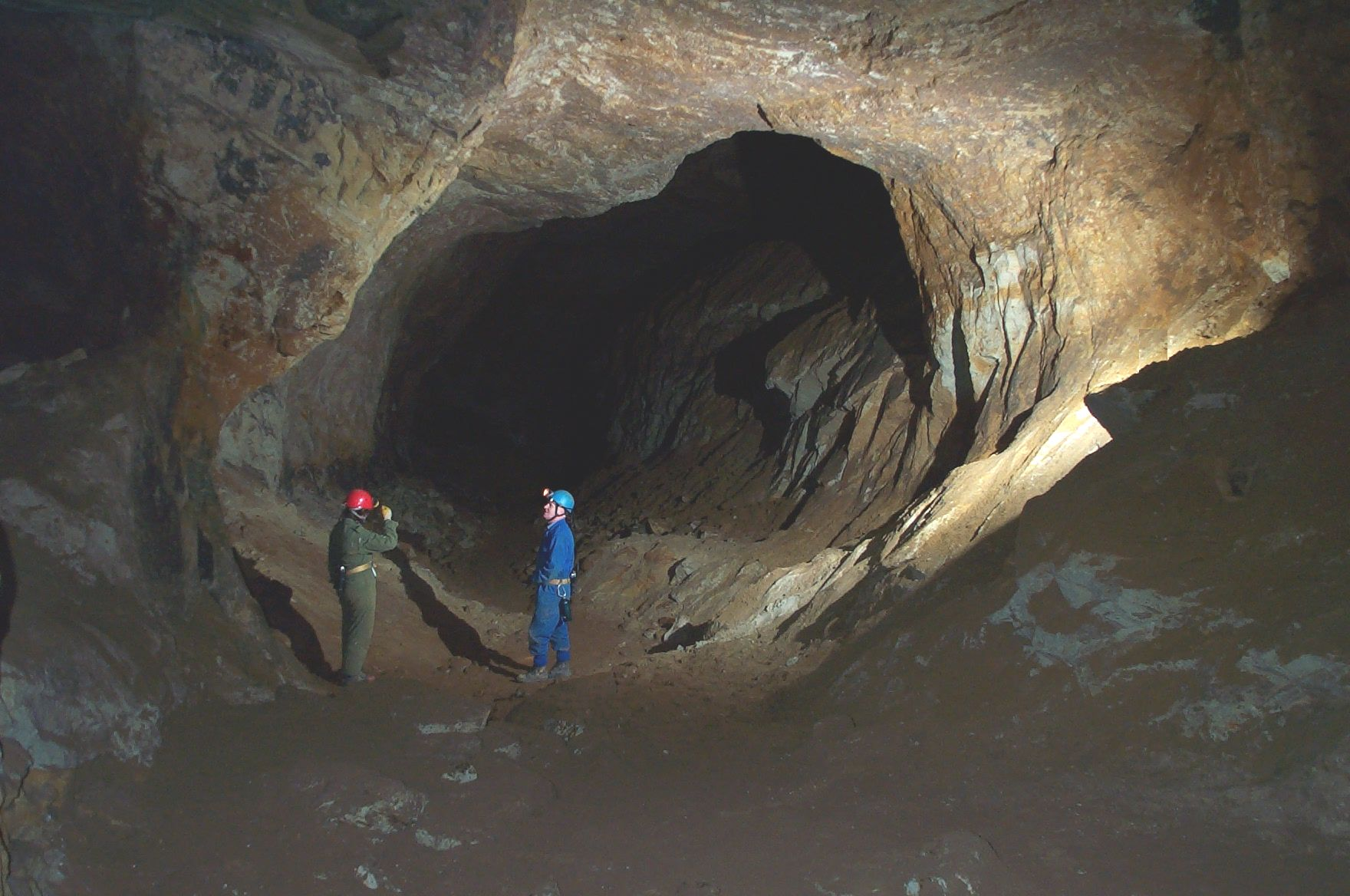
Passage in West Mine

The Edge has a long history of copper mining, with activity dating back to the Bronze Age and Roman times. Mining continued from the 1690s to the 1920s. The National Trust now owns many of the mines, leasing them to the Derbyshire Caving Club, which maintains access and explores long-sealed areas.

Since the 1860s, the mines have attracted thousands of visitors. However, between 1940 and 1960, many were unprepared, leading to accidents that gave the mines a lasting notoriety. The West and Wood Mines were blocked in the early 1960s but, in 1969, the Derbyshire Caving Club reopened Wood Mine with the National Trust's permission. Since then, supervised group visits and excavations have uncovered much of interest.

=== Historic buildings ===
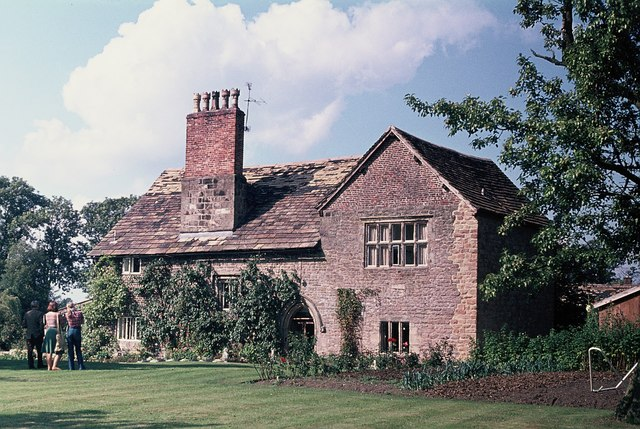
Chorley Old Hall

There are many historic buildings including Chorley Old Hall, which is the oldest surviving manor house in Cheshire.

To the south of the village is the Alderley Park estate, former ancestral home of the Stanleys.

The village is notable for its Victorian villas. The first villa was constructed in the early 1840s and by 1850 thirty "handsome residences" had been erected, mainly by the cotton barons from Manchester who moved out of the city as the railway was built. The buildings are varied in style with examples of mock Tudor, Italian, neo-Georgian and Arts and Crafts Movement designs. The wide range of materials used reflects this somewhat eclectic mix of styles, and includes stone, brick, smooth render or roughcast for the walls, and Welsh slate or clay tiles for the roofs.

== Local legend ==
=== The Wizard of the Edge ===
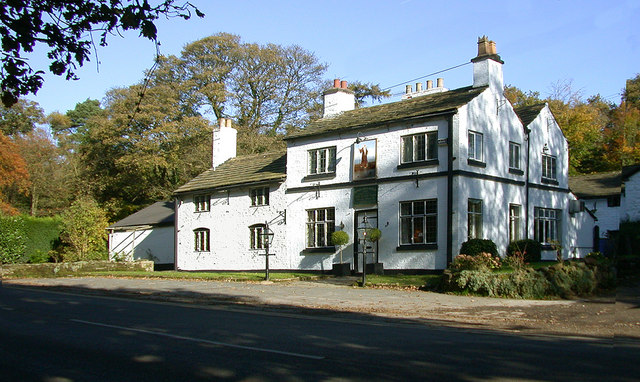
The Wizard pub (currently closed)

Legend tells of a Mobberley farmer leading a milk-white mare to market in Macclesfield. Along the Edge, at a spot called Thieves Hole, an old man in grey stopped him and offered to buy the horse. The farmer declined, confident of a better price at market. The old man predicted that he would return that evening, unsold, to the same spot.

Failing to sell the horse, the farmer retraced his steps. The old man reappeared and repeated his offer, which was now accepted. Leading the farmer to a spot near Stormy Point, the old man waved a wand, uttered a spell, and revealed iron gates in the rock. Inside was a cavern filled with sleeping men and white horses. The old man, a wizard, paid the farmer from a chest and explained the sleepers would rise if England faced peril. He then sent the astonished farmer home.

Several versions of the legend exist. It first appeared in print in 1805 when a letter from "A Perambulator" was published in the Manchester Mail. The author claimed the story came from an old servant of the Stanley family and was often told by Parson Shrigley, Clerk and Curate of Alderley (1753–1776).

The tale later appeared in a tourist pamphlet as The Cheshire Enchanter (prose) and The Legend of the Iron Gates (verse). Some versions include prophecies attributed to Robert Nixon, with the wizard foretelling that the sleeping men and horses would awaken to save the country during George the son of George’s reign. Later adaptations, such as James Roscoe's poem, suggest the wizard was Merlin and the sleepers were King Arthur’s army.

There are a number of similar British legends which closely resemble the Alderley one, though since they are all founded in oral tradition it is not possible to know which came first. A very similar one was made into a ballad called Sir Guy the Seeker by Matthew 'Monk' Lewis, and is based on a legend of Dunstanburgh Castle. In his preface to Sir Guy the Seeker Lewis pointed out the similarity to the Alderley legend.

Alan Garner used the legend of The Wizard of the Edge, and other local legends, in his novels The Weirdstone of Brisingamen and The Moon of Gomrath. Garner, born in Congleton, was raised in Alderley Edge.

== Transport ==
=== Roads ===
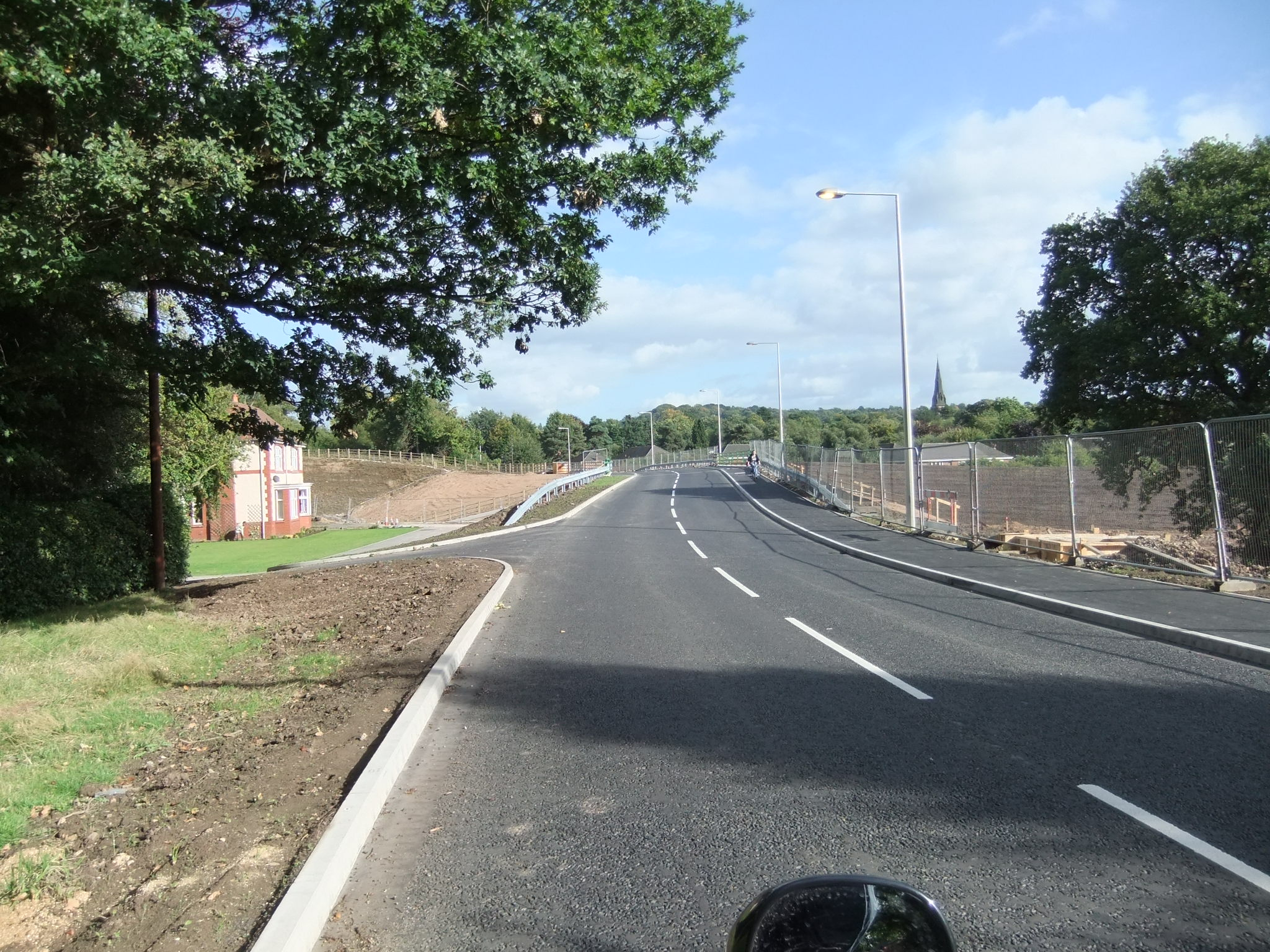
New bridge over the bypass at Brook Lane, September 2010

After several decades of discussion, a 5 km, north-to-south A34 Alderley Edge bypass was constructed (officially named Melrose Way) to the west of Alderley Edge to relieve the congestion in the village. It starts at the Harden roundabout at the end of the Wilmslow bypass and goes west of Alderley Edge, then rejoins the A34 close to the entrance of Alderley Park.

The £56 million project was carried out by Birse Civils and was officially opened by the Chancellor of the Exchequer and local MP, George Osborne, on 19 November 2010.

=== Railway ===
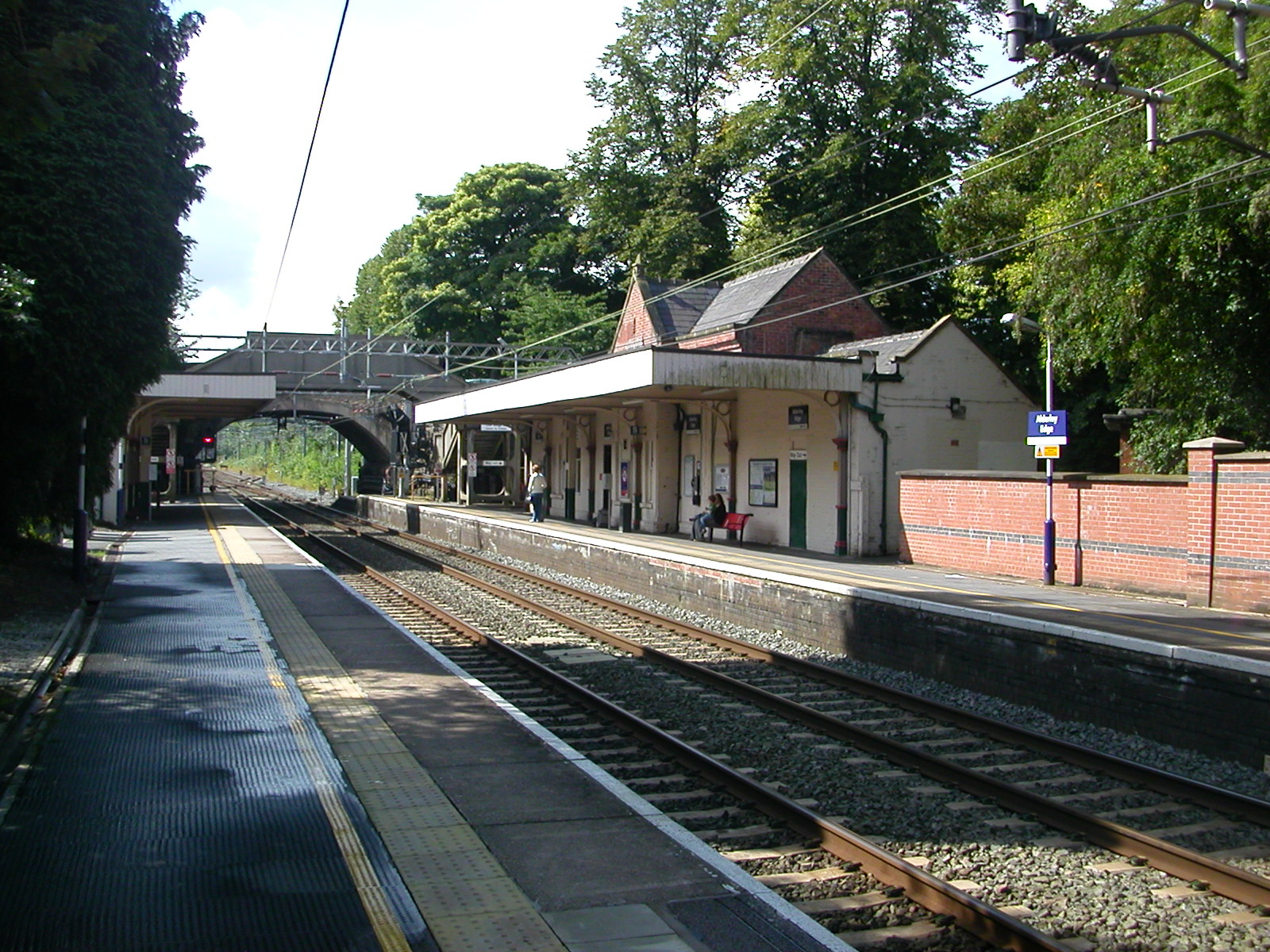
Alderley Edge station

Alderley Edge railway station is situated on the Crewe to Manchester line, which is a spur of the West Coast Main Line. There are generally two trains per hour to Crewe, two to Manchester Piccadilly via Stockport and one to Manchester Piccadilly via Manchester Airport; on Sundays, there is an hourly service each way between Crewe and Manchester Piccadilly, via Stockport. The station is managed by Northern, which also operates all services that stop here.

=== Buses ===
Alderley Edge is served by the 130 bus route, which is operated by D&G Bus; it runs hourly during the daytime (except Sundays) between Macclesfield, Wilmslow and Manchester Airport.

== In popular culture ==
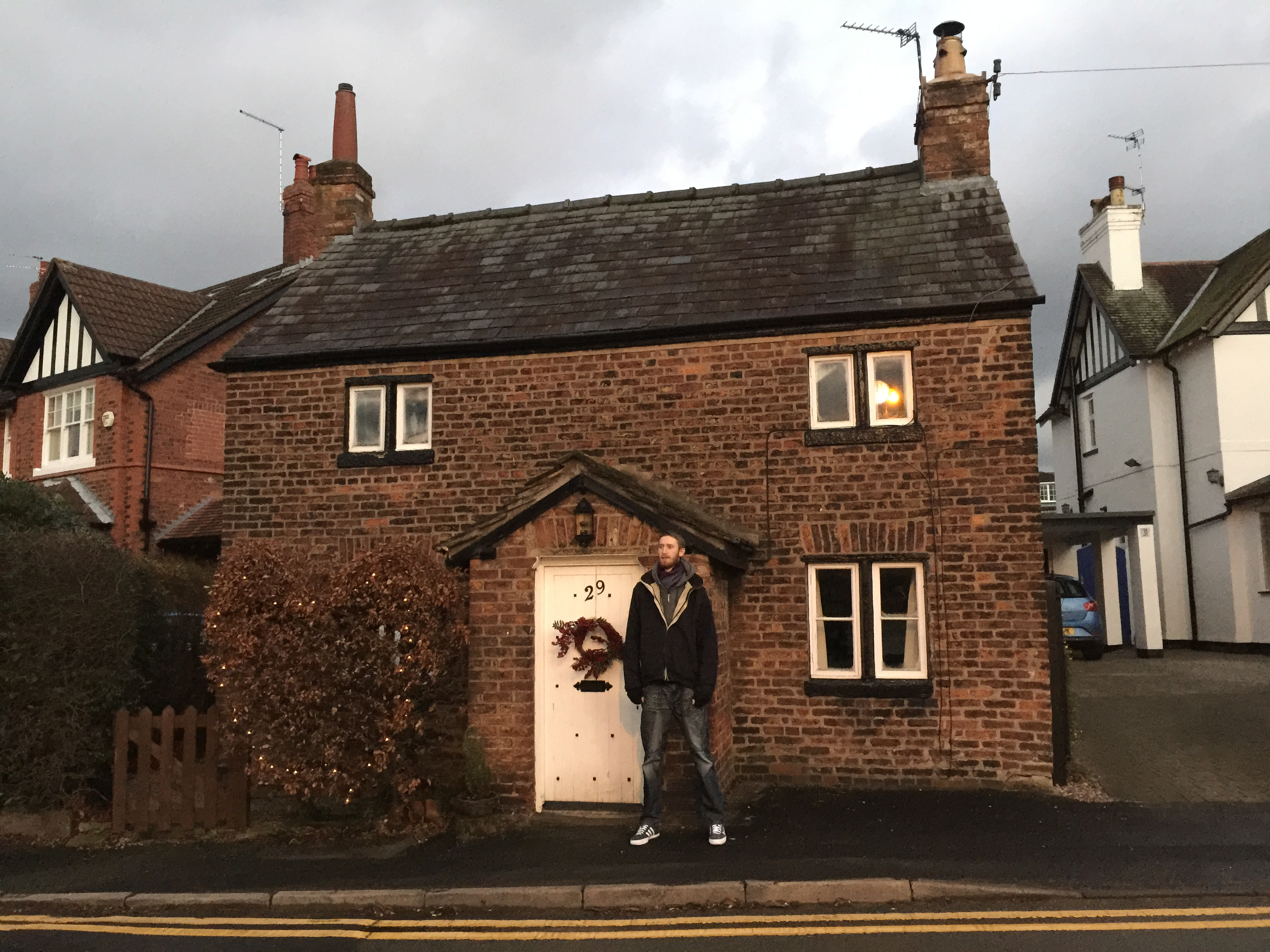
A cottage in the village

Alderley Edge has been used as a major setting in various books and television shows:

- It was the main setting of the Channel 4 show Goldplated
- The location inspired Peter Graham to compose "On Alderley Edge", a commission for the Black Dyke Band.
- It was the main setting of the MTV show Living on the Edge
- The Edge and the country south of it was the setting for Alan Garner's novels The Weirdstone of Brisingamen and The Moon of Gomrath.
- The village has been featured in the ITVBe show The Real Housewives of Cheshire.

== Notable residents ==
The village has been home and is connected to many notable residents, including several footballers, including:

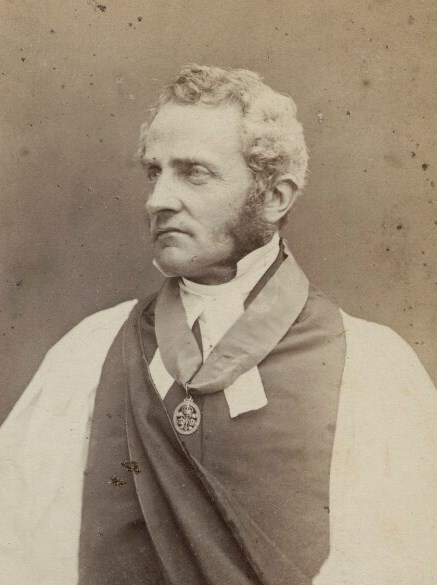
Arthur Penrhyn Stanley by John Watkins

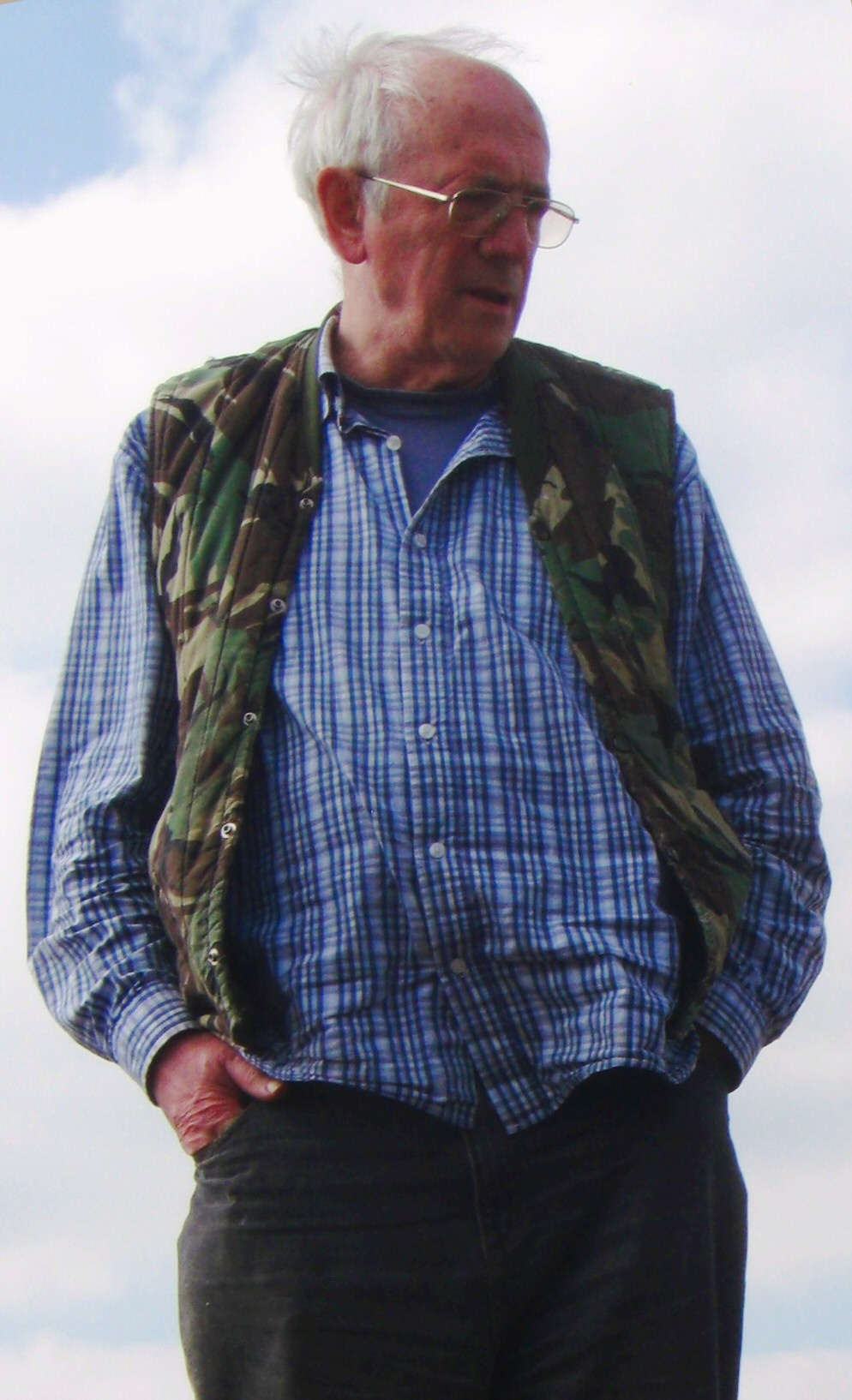
Alan Garner in 2011

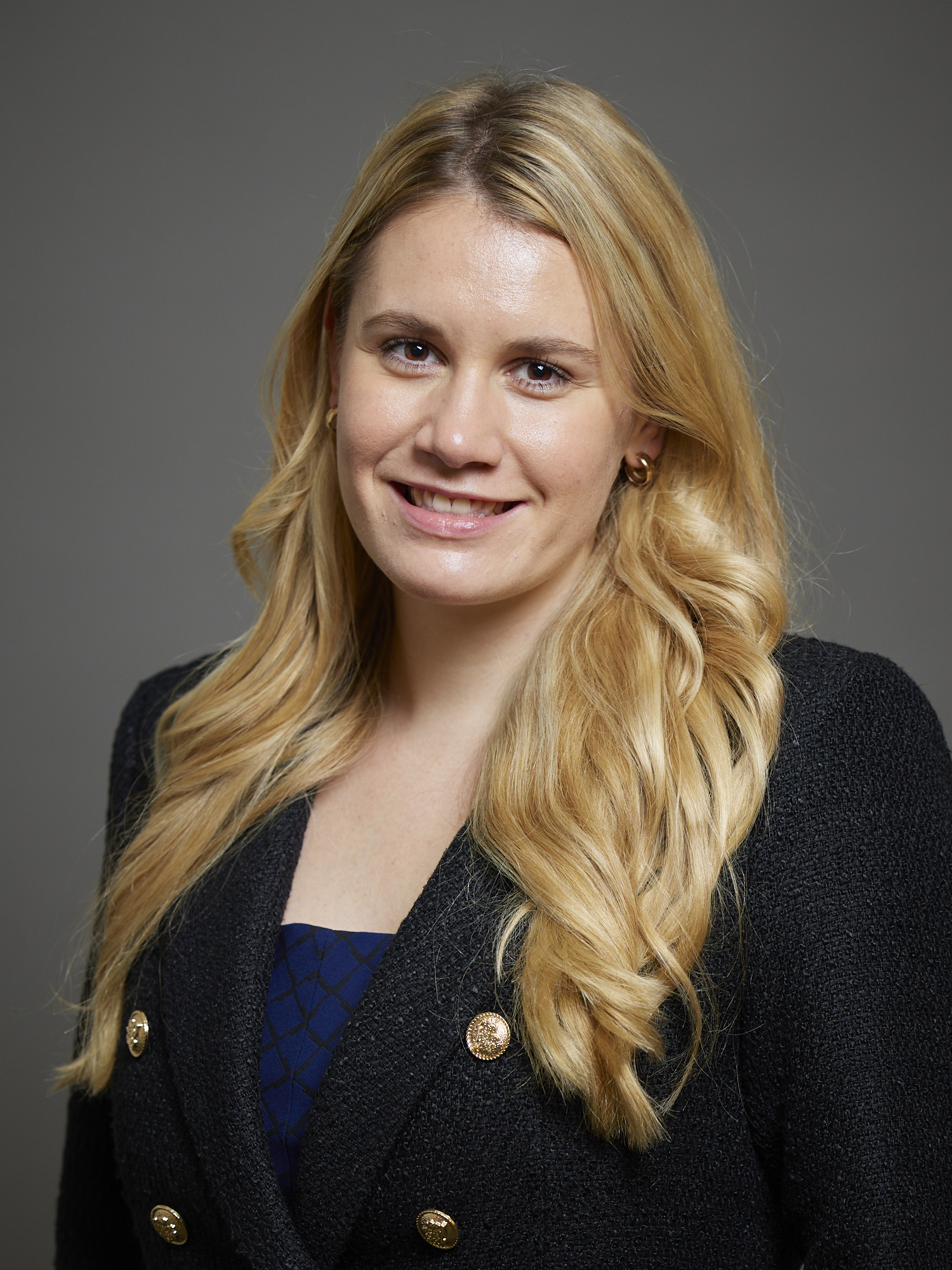
Baroness Owen of Alderley Edge, 2023

- Arthur Penrhyn Stanley (1815 in AE–1881), Anglican priest and historian, Dean of Westminster 1864/1881.
- Sir Kenneth Stewart, 1st Baronet (1882 – 1972 in AE), president of Trustee Savings Banks Association
- Lady Katharine Chorley (1897-1986), a British writer and mountaineer, brought up in AE
- Alan Garner (born 1934), author, who wrote the children's fantasy novel The Weirdstone of Brisingamen, which is set on Alderley Edge, lived on Trafford Road at the corner with Stevens Street and Moss Lane.
- George Gissing (1857–1903), novelist, who studied in Alderley Edge.
- Tim Healy (born 1952), an English actor.
- Bernard Sumner (born 1956), an English musician co-founder of Joy Division
- Peter Hook (born 1956), an English musician, co-founder of Joy Division
- Andrew Higginson (born 1957), businessman and chairman of Wm Morrison Supermarkets Plc
- Denise Welch (born 1958), an English actress, TV personality, writer and broadcaster.
- Victoria Beckham (born 1974), an English fashion designer, singer, and TV personality. She was a member of the pop group the Spice Girls, and was nicknamed Posh Spice. she previously resided in AE.
- Richard Fleeshman (born 1989) an English actor on Coronation Street and singer.
- Matty Healy (born 1989), an English singer-songwriter and record producer spent his formative years in AE.
- Helen Flanagan (born 1990), an English actress on Coronation Street, model, and TV personality.
- Charlotte Owen, Baroness Owen of Alderley Edge (born 1993), life peer and former special adviser, grew up in the village.
- The Pilkington family (of Pilkington's Glass) owned all of the woodland now known as The Edge until 1948, when their daughters donated the land to the National Trust. The Pilkington company developed the toughened safety glass necessary when motor cars and very tall buildings became popular. They became hugely wealthy. On Woodbrook Road they built The Cedars as the family home, which has a distinctive large tower and is built from white stone.
- The architect and furniture designer J. Henry Sellers (1861–1954) spent the latter part of his life at Bollin Tower.

=== Sport ===
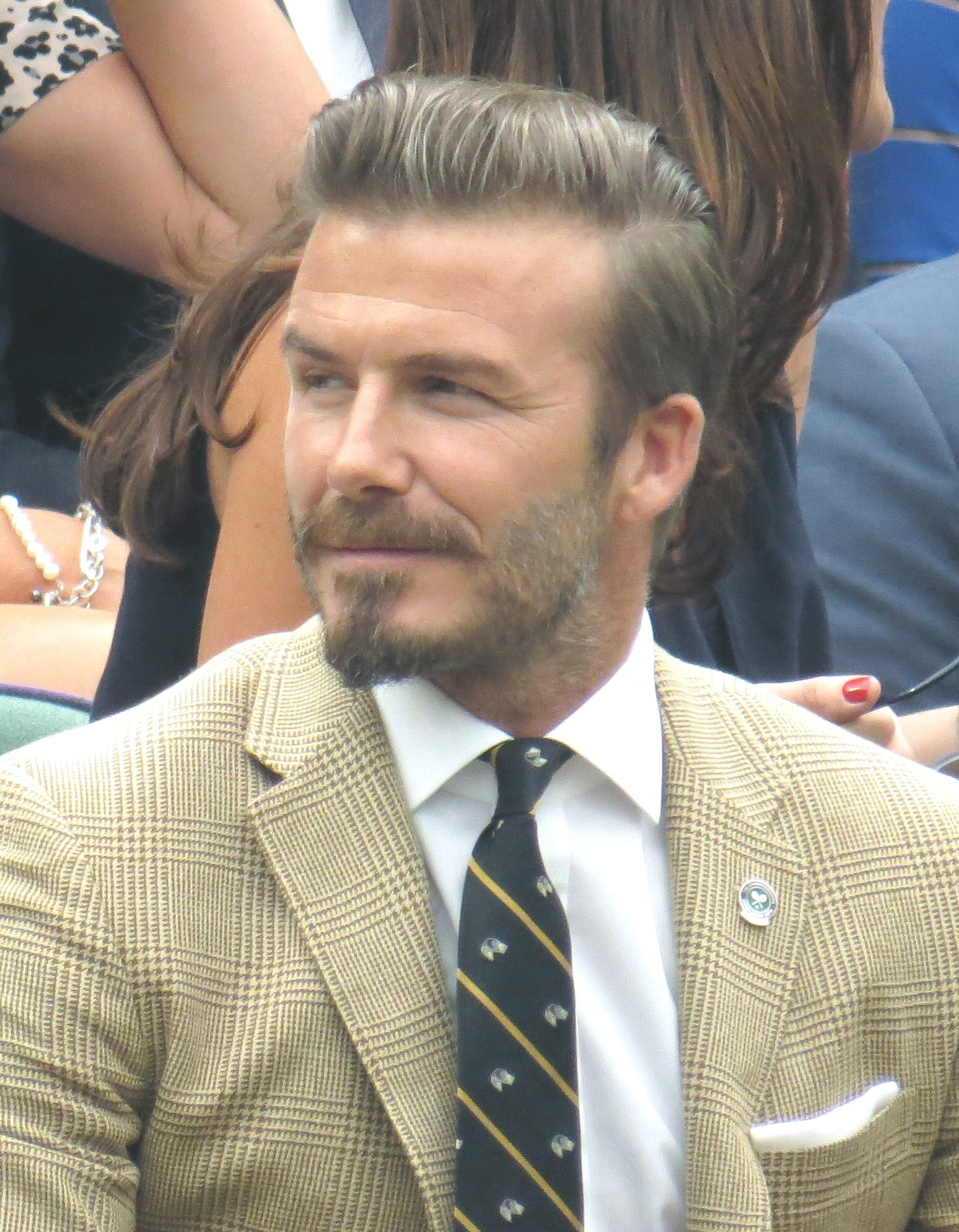
David Beckham, 2014

- William Fairhurst (1903 in AE – 1982), a bridge designer and international chess master.
- Harry Burgess (1904 in AE – 1957), an English footballer who played 469 games
- David Coleman (1926 in AE – 2013), BBC sports commentator and TV presenter 46 years.
- Anne Hobbs (born 1959), former WTA tennis player and coach
- Andy Cole (born 15 October 1971), former footballer who played 509 games and 15 for England.
- Dwight Yorke (born 1971), former footballer who played 481 games and 72 for Trinidad and Tobago and is now their head coach.
- David Beckham (born 1975), former footballer who played 523 games and 115 for England.
- Rio Ferdinand (born 1978), a former footballer who played 514 games and 81 for England
- Michael Carrick (born 1981), former footballer who played 524 games and 34 for England
- Joleon Lescott (born 1982), former footballer, coach and sports pundit; he played 504 games and 26 for England
- Devante Cole (born 1995 in AE), footballer who has played over 300 games

== See also ==
- Listed buildings in Alderley Edge
- Geology of Alderley Edge
- Macclesfield group power stations
