= Listed buildings in Alderley Edge =

Alderley Edge is a civil parish in Cheshire East, England. It contains 30 buildings that are recorded in the National Heritage List for England as designated listed buildings. Of these, one is listed at Grade I, the highest grade, one is listed at Grade II*, the middle grade, and the others are at Grade II. The parish contains the village of Alderley Edge, which became a dormitory settlement for workers in Manchester following the arrival of the railway in 1842. Included in the listed buildings are mansions for the more wealthy businessmen. In the countryside surrounding the village are listed houses, cottages, and farm buildings. Within the village, in addition to houses, the listed buildings include a former railway hotel, churches, a school, a bank, a drinking fountain, a war memorial, and a garage.

== Key ==
Grade	Criteria
I	Buildings of exceptional interest, sometimes considered to be internationally important
II*	Particularly important buildings of more than special interest
II	Buildings of national importance and special interest

== Buildings ==
Name and location	Photograph	Date	Notes	Grade
Chorley Old Hall; 53.29989°N 2.24527°W		c. 1330	The house has an L-shaped plan, the older range being built in sandstone with some brick. The other range was built in the 16th century and is timber-framed on a stone plinth. Both ranges have Kerridge stone-slate roofs, and both are in two storeys with gables. The windows are mullioned or mullioned and transomed. The house stands on a moated site that is a scheduled monument.	I
The Cobbles and The Barn; 53.30050°N 2.24543°W	—	16th century	Originally the barn and shippon for Chorley Old Hall, later converted into two houses. They are timber-framed on a stone plinth with brick nogging and a Kerridge stone-slate roof. There have been alterations in the 18th and 20th centuries, including the addition of three dormers.	II
Willow Cottage; 53.30829°N 2.24702°W	—	16th century	The house is basically timber-framed on a stone plinth, partly with brick nogging, partly plastered, and partly encased in brick. It is roofed in Kerridge stone-slate, and in Welsh slate. The plan is of a central hall with two cross-wings. On the north front the timber framing is exposed; the south front is in brick with two gables. Between the gables is a small gabled porch.	II
Bridge over moat, Chorley Old Hall; 53.30010°N 2.24514°W	—	16th century (probable)	The bridge is built in sandstone, and consists of two semicircular arches springing from low piers. It has a low parapet, and the roadway is in concrete.	II
Saddlebole Farmhouse; 53.30269°N 2.21310°W		17th century (or earlier)	The farmhouse was rebuilt in the early 18th century, and altered in the 20th century. It is built in brick on a sandstone plinth, and has a thatched roof. The original farmhouse has a rectangular plan, and two ranges were added later to the rear. It is in 1 1/2 storeys, and has a five-bay front. In the left bay is a lean-to porch with a Kerridge stone-slate roof. The windows are casements, those in the upper floor being in dormers.	II
The Stone House; 53.30553°N 2.23503°W	—	1634	The house originated as a farmhouse, and was altered in the 19th and 20th centuries. It is built in sandstone with a Kerridge stone-slate roof. The house has a H-shaped plan, is in two storeys, and has a four-bay front. The outer bays protrude slightly forward, and each bay contains a mullioned window in the lower floor and a casement window in the upper floors under a stuccoed gable. Also in the front is a seven-light mullioned and transomed window with a casement window in a gabled half-dormer above.	II
Barn near Rockery Cottage; 53.30201°N 2.21091°W		17th century	The barn originated as a cottage. It is timber-framed on a stone plinth with brick nogging and a Welsh slate roof. In the west end is an upper cruck truss. The other end is in brick. Over one of the doors is a lintel carved with the date 1708, but the building originated earlier.	II
Holly Trees; 53.30132°N 2.21750°W	—	17th century	A timber-framed house with brick nogging on a stone plinth with a Welsh slate roof. It is in two storeys, and has a three-bay front. At the left end is a panelled door. The windows are casements. To the left is a brick lean-to extension, and on the right side is an upper cruck truss.	II
Common Carr Farmhouse; 53.30382°N 2.25146°W	—	Late 17th century	The farmhouse was altered in the 19th and 20th centuries. It is built in brick with a Welsh slate roof. It is in two storeys, with gables on the front. The windows on the front are casements, and those on the rear are mullioned and transomed.	II
The Cottage; 53.30194°N 2.23300°W		Mid 18th century	A brick cottage with a Welsh slate roof, it is in two storeys with a symmetrical three-bay front. The windows are mullioned. A gabled porch projects from the centre.	II
Barns, Ryley's Farm; 53.30189°N 2.24438°W	—	1802	The barns are built in brick with Welsh slate roofs, and form three sides of a courtyard. Features include a cart entrance, pitch holes, and ventilation holes in diamond patterns.	II
Milestone; 53.31338°N 2.23748°W	—	Early 19th century	The milestone is in sandstone, and is slightly triangular with a triangular top. On the faces are the distances to Wilmslow and to Congleton.	II
Queen's Hotel; 53.30418°N 2.23706°W	—	1845	The hotel was built by the Manchester and Birmingham Railway, it was extended later in the century, and converted into offices in the 1980s. It is built in red brick with dressings in blue and yellow brick and in sandstone. It has a Welsh slate roof. The building is in three storeys, with a symmetrical three-bay entrance front. In the centre is a projecting porch with strip pilasters, and a frieze with the name of the hotel. The windows are mullioned or mullioned and transomed. The front has two shaped gables with pointed finials. Along the south front are 17 bays.	II
Woodbrook House; 53.30047°N 2.22980°W	—	c. 1845	The house as extensively rebuilt in 1905 and 1914–18 by C. F. A. Voysey. It is built in brick, partly roughcast, with sandstone dressings, and has a Welsh slate roof. The house is in two storeys, and has a four-bay north front with two gables. The windows are a mix of mullioned, mullioned and transomed, circular, and lunettes.	II
Broomfield House; 53.29732°N 2.22944°W	—	1845–47	The house was designed by Thomas Worthington for another client, and extended by him for his own use in 1875. It is built in sandstone and has a Welsh slate roof; the extension is in stone and timber framing. Originally in a T-shaped plan, it has two storeys and a four-bay front. The right two bays project forward, and each has a gable. In the upper storey of the right end bay is a canted oriel window. The windows are either mullioned or mullioned and transomed.	II
Bollin Tower; 53.30038°N 2.22291°W	—	1846	Originally a large villa, this has since been altered and extended and converted into two dwellings. It is built in sandstone and has a Welsh slate roof. The building is in two and three storeys, and has a two-bay front. Towards the left of the building is an octagonal turret with a higher turret corbelled out from its side. The windows are mullioned and transomed.	II
Croston Cottage; 53.29889°N 2.22501°W	—	1847	The house was extended in the early 20th century. It is built in rendered brick on a stone plinth with a Welsh slate roof. Originally T-shaped, the extension gave it a square plan. The house is in Tudor Gothic style, is in two storeys, and has a three-bay front. In the central bay is a doorway with a four-centred arched head, above which is a balcony with a plain parapet. The right bay projects forward.	II
Alvaston, Ashley, Kermincham, Somerford (The Cedars); 53.30063°N 2.22781°W	—	c. 1850	Originating as one large villa designed by John Gregan called Firwoods, and later The Cedars, it has been divided into four dwellings. The house is built in brick with sandstone dressings, and has a Welsh slate roof in Italianate style. It is in two storeys with a four-bay front. A three-bay billiard room was added in 1907. The stone porch is in Ionic style with a balcony. The windows are sashes. Behind the billiard room is a four-stage belvedere.	II
Franklyn Lodge; 53.29834°N 2.23002°W	—	c. 1850	A lodge cottage built in red sandstone with buff sandstone dressings and a Welsh slate roof in Tudor Gothic style. It is in a cross-shaped plan, has 1 1/2 storeys, and a two-bay front. The left bay projects forward with a coped gable, and the porch projects further with a balcony above. On the left side is a triangular gable containing a balustraded parapet.	II
St Philip's Church; 53.3044°N 2.2388°W		1851–52	The church was designed by J. S. Crowther. In the first phase the nave, chancel and south aisle were built, and in 1856–57 the steeple and the north aisle were added and the nave was extended by one bay. F. P.Oakley added the vestry in 1903. The church is built in sandstone; it has a roof of differently coloured slates with a pierced crest. It is in Decorated style.	II*
County Primary School; 53.3044°N 2.2397°W	—	1854	The school was designed by J. S. Crowther in Decorated style. It is built in brick with sandstone dressings and a Welsh slate roof. The school has a rectangular plan, it is in one storey, and the original front has three bays. The left bay has a gable containing a four-light window, and with a bellcote on its apex.	II
Gatehouse, dovecote and walls, Broomfield House; 53.29732°N 2.22921°W	—	1875	The gatehouse, the dovecote and the attached walls were designed by Thomas Worthington for his own house. The gatehouse and walls are in sandstone and form a three-sided courtyard added to the house. On the ridge of the gatehouse is a wooden dovecote with a tall pyramidal roof and a weathervane.	II
Redclyffe Grange; 53.30078°N 2.22879°W	—	c. 1855	A house built for his own use by J. S. Crowther in Gothic Revival style. It is constructed in brick with sandstone dressings, and has a roof that is partly in stone-slate and partly tiled. The house is in two storeys with a four-bay front. To the right of the house is a low three-stage tower. An archway flanked by walls at the northeast corner of the house is included in the listing.	II
Methodist Church and Church Hall; 53.3008°N 2.2337°W		1863	The church and hall were designed by Hayley and Sons, and are built in sandstone with Welsh slate roofs. The church consists of a nave, two side-chapels, and a southwest tower with a broach spire containing lucarnes. The hall forms an additional range to the rear. The tracery is in Decorated style.	II
Drinking fountain 53.29869°N 2.22584°W	—	1888	A sandstone drinking fountain in the boundary wall of a former house. It consists of a shell-arched niche with a projecting semicircular bowl and a cast iron waterspout. The fountain is inscribed with the date and with the initial "W".	II
Barclay's Bank; 53.30161°N 2.23644°W		1904	The bank was originally built for the Union Bank and designed by Percy Worthington. It has a symmetrical three-bay front, and is in three storeys, the bottom storey being in stone, and the upper two storeys in brick. The windows are mullioned and transomed. The outer bays contain bowed bay windows, with a decorative doorway between them. At the top are two gables with finials. From the corner of the building protrudes a clock on a stone bracket. Down the right side of the bank are three stuccoed gables each containing a bowed oriel window.	II
Gate to Woodbrook and Hawkwell; 53.30042°N 2.23188°W	—	1906	The gateway was designed by C. F. A. Voysey. The piers are square and in sandstone. The gate is wooden with typical Voysey iron fittings.	II
The Penn; 53.29878°N 2.22142°W	—	1912	A brick house with a Cotswold stone-slate roof designed by Percy Worthington in Neo-Georgian style. It has an L-shaped plan, is in two storeys, and has a symmetrical seven-bay front. This contains a central semicircular-headed doorway, and three dormers that are hipped and gabled. The windows are sashes.	II
War Memorial; 53.30412°N 2.23817°W	—	1921	The memorial is in sandstone and was designed by Hubert Worthington. It consists of a tapering octagonal column standing on an octagonal base itself on a stepped octagonal plinth. At the top is a canopied and buttressed lantern containing a statue of a winged Saint Michael. It is surrounded by a low wall incorporating raised sections containing bronze plaques inscribed with the names of the fallen.	II
Tower Garage; 53.30495°N 2.23743°W	—	1962	This was built as a petrol station, offices and car showroom. It was designed by Berkeley Moir in Modernist style. The building has a circular plan, and consists of a central rotunda under a much larger saucer-shaped canopy. It is built in reinforced concrete with glazed panels and timber cladding.	II

== See also ==
- Listed buildings in Wilmslow
- Listed buildings in Mottram St Andrew
- Listed buildings in Over Alderley
- Listed buildings in Nether Alderley
- Listed buildings in Chorley
