= St Philip's Church, Alderley Edge =

Coordinates: 53.3044°N 2.2387°W

St Philip and St James Church, Alderley Edge
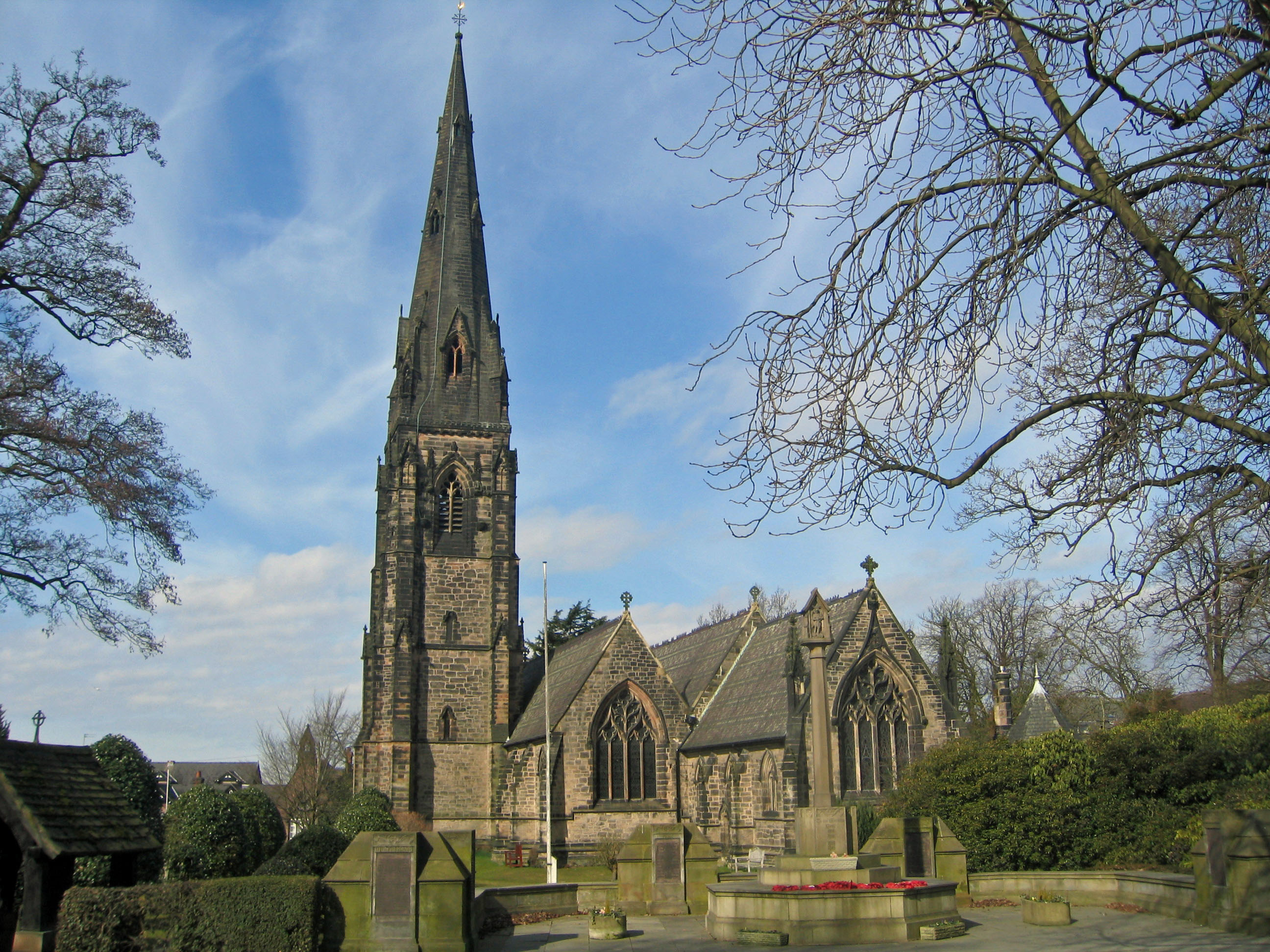
- St Philip's Church, Alderley Edge, from the south

- Location in Cheshire
- OS grid reference: SJ 841 786
- Location: Alderley Edge, Cheshire
- Country: England
- Denomination: Anglican
- Website: http://www.stphilipandstjames.co.uk

History
- Status: Parish church
- Dedication: St Philip and St James

Architecture
- Functional status: Active
- Heritage designation: Grade II*
- Designated: 6 July 1984
- Architect(s): J. S. Crowther; F. P. Oakley
- Architectural type: Church
- Style: Gothic Revival
- Groundbreaking: 1853
- Completed: 1903

Specifications
- Materials: Sandstone, slate roof

Administration
- Province: York
- Diocese: Chester
- Archdeaconry: Macclesfield
- Deanery: Knutsford
- Parish: Alderley Edge

Clergy
- Vicar: Rev Robin Pye

St Philip's Church is in the village of Alderley Edge, Cheshire, England. The church is recorded in the National Heritage List for England as a designated Grade II* listed building. It is an active Anglican parish church in the diocese of Chester, the archdeaconry of Macclesfield and the deanery of Knutsford. The architectural historian Nikolaus Pevsner described it as "large, ambitious, and unmistakably prosperous-looking".

== History ==
St Philip's was designed by the Manchester architect J. S. Crowther, and was his first independent work. It originated in 1851–52 when the nave, the south aisle and the chancel were built. In 1856–57 the north aisle, a further bay on the west of the church, and a steeple to the south of the church, were added. A vestry was added in 1903 to a design by F. P. Oakley.

== Architecture ==
=== Exterior ===
The church is built in hammer-dressed sandstone rubble with ashlar dressings. The slate roof is in bands of three colours. Its architectural style is Decorated. The plan of the church consists of a six-bay nave with north and south aisles, each under its own ridge, a three-bay chancel, a hexagonal vestry, and a southwest tower with a spire. The tower is in four stages with angle buttresses and the spire has three levels of lucarnes.

=== Interior ===
In the north wall of the chancel is a sedilia, and in the south wall is a piscina. The carved reredos of 1903 depicts the Last Supper. The choir stalls, pulpit and organ screen, all dated 1907, are panelled. These were designed by Percy Worthington. In the south aisle is a stained glass window made by Morris & Co. dating from 1873. These include figures designed by Edward Burne-Jones and Ford Madox Brown. Elsewhere are windows dating from 1933 to 1935 by Powells. The three-manual organ was built by Wadsworth of Manchester and was rebuilt in 1962 by Jardine and Company, also of Manchester.

== See also ==
- List of works by J. S. Crowther
- Listed buildings in Alderley Edge
- Alderley Edge Methodist Church
