= Macclesfield group power stations =

Locations of the three power stations

The Macclesfield group power stations are three relatively small electric power stations at Alderley Edge, Buxton, and Macclesfield, England. They supplied electricity to their respective towns from 1890s to the 1960s. The oil-engine stations were operated by a succession of private and public owners prior to the nationalisation of the British electricity industry in 1948. The power stations were redeveloped as a group in the 1950s as demand for electricity grew and old plant was replaced.

== History ==
=== Alderley Edge ===
In 1895 Alderley Edge District Council applied for a provisional order under the Electric Lighting Acts to generate and supply electricity to the town. The Alderley Edge Electric Lighting Order 1895 was granted by the Board of Trade and was confirmed by Parliament through the Electric Lighting Orders Confirmation (No. 2) Act 1895 (58 & 59 Vict. c. lxvii). The following year the provisional order was transferred to the Alderley and Wilmslow Electric Supply Company Limited. The company, which was registered 23 April 1896, built power stations at Heyes Lane, Alderley Edge and at Wilmslow, Cheshire. (Note: There is no record of there ever having been a power station in Wilmslow. It is likely the entry in the Manual of Electricity Supply is erroneous and should have stated that the Hayes Lane power station supplied electricity for Alderley Edge and Wilmslow.) The company supplied electricity to the area prior to the nationalisation of the British electricity industry in 1948. As a consequence of nationalisation the company was abolished and ownership of its power stations was vested in the British Electricity Authority, and subsequently the Central Electricity Authority and the Central Electricity Generating Board (CEGB). At the same time the electricity distribution and sales responsibilities of the company's electricity undertaking were transferred to the Merseyside and North Wales Electricity Board (MANWEB). In the 1950s the old plant at Alderley Edge was decommissioned and new plant installed. The station was decommissioned in the late 1960s.

=== Buxton ===
Buxton Corporation was granted a provisional order to generate and supply electricity in Buxton, Derbyshire in 1894. The Buxton Electric Lighting Order 1894 was put on a statutory basis by the Electric Lighting Orders Confirmation (No. 1) Act 1894 (57 & 58 Vict. c. xlix). An oil driven plant was built at Ashwood Dale, Buxton and continued to operate until the 1950s when it was replaced. Buxton Corporation's electricity undertaking was abolished by electricity nationalisation in 1948, the power station was vested in the British Electricity Authority, and the distribution and sales functions transferred to MANWEB. The station was decommissioned in the late 1960s.

=== Macclesfield ===
Macclesfield Corporation was granted a provisional order to generate and supply electricity in 1901. The Macclesfield Electric Lighting Order 1901 was put on a statutory basis by the Electric Lighting Orders Confirmation (No. 5) Act 1901 (1 Edw. 7. c. cxxxviii). An oil-engine driven plant was built at George Street, Macclesfield, Cheshire. The provisional order was transferred to the Electricity Company of Macclesfield Limited which operated the undertaking until it was abolished by nationalisation of the electricity industry in 1948. The power station was vested in the British Electricity Authority, and the distribution and sales functions of the company were transferred to MANWEB. The plant at the station was scrapped and replaced in the 1950s. The station was decommissioned in the late 1960s.

Following nationalisation the area supplied by the Macclesfield Group became an electricity supply district, covering 148 square miles (380 km^{2}) with an estimated population of 103,700. It included the Boroughs of Macclesfield and Buxton, and the Districts of Bollington, Wilmslow, Alderley Edge, Hazel Grove, Marple, Whaley Bridge and New Mills.

== Equipment specification ==
=== Alderley Edge ===
By 1923 the generating plant comprised:

- 2 × 45 kW reciprocating steam engine driven generators
- 1 × 150 kW reciprocating steam engine driven generator
- 2 × 125 kW oil fired engine driven generators
- 1 × 150 kW oil fired engine driven generator

These machines gave a total generating capacity of 640 kW of direct current.

Electricity supplies to consumers were at 420 & 210 Volt DC.

The steam plant was decommissioned in the 1930s. The original oil fired station was closed on 1 April 1953 and the oil plant removed. It was re-commissioned in December 1954 and comprised:

- 2 × 2 MW Mirrlees/Brush diesel engine alternator sets operating at 11 kV, one commissioned in December 1954 and the second in June 1955.
- 1 × Davenport cooling tower, capacity 60,000 gallons per hour (273 m^{3}/h), with a cooling range 110.5 to 85 °F (43.6 to 29.4 °C).

=== Buxton ===
By 1923 the generating plant comprised:

- 1 × 80 kW gas engine driven generator
- 1 × 100 kW gas engine driven generator
- 2 × 200 kW gas engine driven generators

These machines gave a total generating capacity of 580 kW of direct current.

Electricity supplies to consumers were at 460 & 230 Volt DC.

The old 570 kW plant was scrapped on 1 April 1953. New plant was commissioned in December 1954. This comprised:

- 2 × 2 MW Mirrlees/Brush diesel engine alternator sets operating at 6.6 kV
- 1 × Davenport cooling tower, capacity 60,000 gallons per hour (273 m^{3}/h), with a cooling range of 110.5 to 85 °F (43.6 to 29.4 °C).

=== Macclesfield ===
By 1923 the generating plant comprised:

- 2 × 135 kW oil fired engine driven generators
- 1 × 225 kW oil fired engine driven generator
- 2 × 250 kW oil fired engine driven generators
- 1 × 350 kW oil fired engine driven generator

These machines gave a total generating capacity of 1,345 kW of direct current.

Electricity supplies to consumers were at 460 & 230 Volt DC.

New plant was commissioned in March 1955. This comprised:

- 1 × 2 MW Mirrlees/Brush diesel engine alternator sets operating at 11 kV
- 1 × Davenport cooling tower, capacity 30,000 gallons per hour (137 m^{3}/h), cooling range 110.5 to 85 °F (43.6 to 29.4 °C).

== Operations ==
=== Alderley Edge ===
The operating data for the period 1921–23 is given in the table and shows the amount of electricity sold to each type of consumer, the maximum loads and some financial data.

Alderley Edge power station operating data 1921–23
Electricity Use	Units	Year		
Electricity Use	Units	1921	1922	1923
Lighting and domestic	MWh	192	217	249
Public lighting	MWh	15	13	16
Traction	MWh	0	0	0
Power	MWh	77	65	61
Total use	MWh	283	296	325
Load and connected load
Maximum load	kW	231	253	264
Total connections	kW	1467	1539	1630
Load factor	Per cent	17.9	17.4	18.7
Financial
Revenue from sales of current	Alderley Edge	–	£4577	£4965
Revenue from sales of current	Wilmslow	–	£5536	£6241

Alderley Edge power station had a maximum load of 461 MW and supplied 32.24 MWh of electricity in 1946.

Operating data for the period 1954–58 was:

Alderley Edge power station operating data, 1956–58
Year	Running hours	Max output capacity MW	Electricity supplied MWh	Thermal efficiency per cent
1956	299	4	574	50.3
1957	225	4	722	80.2
1958	243	4	926	95.3

The combined performance of the Macclesfield Group power stations for 1961–63 is given below under Macclesfield.

=== Buxton ===
The operating data for the period 1921–23 was:

Buxton power station operating data 1921–23
Electricity Use	Units	Year		
Electricity Use	Units	1921	1922	1923
Lighting and domestic	MWh	346	309	414
Public lighting	MWh	22	22	26
Traction	MWh	0	0	0
Power	MWh	72	105	103
Total use	MWh	489	468	484
Load and connected load
Maximum load	kW	344	360	413
Total connections	kW	1527	1766	1766
Load factor	Per cent	19.7	18.9	20.2
Financial
Revenue from sales of current	£	–	£13,003	£16,073
Surplus of revenue over expenses	£	–	£2,866	£8,957

Buxton power station had a maximum load of 819 MW and supplied 228.57 MWh of electricity in 1946.

Operating data for the period 1955–58 was:

Buxton power station operating data, 1955–58
Year	Running hours	Max output capacity MW	Electricity supplied MWh	Thermal efficiency per cent
1955	28	4	41	36.6
1956	303	4	725	59.8
1957	139	4	379	68.2
1958	182	4	531	72.9

The combined performance of the Macclesfield Group power stations for 1961–63 is given below under Macclesfield.

=== Macclesfield ===
The operating data for the period 1921–23 was:

Macclesfield power station operating data 1921–23
Electricity Use	Units	Year		
Electricity Use	Units	1921	1922	1923
Lighting and domestic	MWh	193	212	247
Public lighting	MWh	0	0	0
Traction	MWh	0	0	0
Power	MWh	839	623	896
Total use	MWh	1032	835	1143
Load and connected load
Maximum load	kW	551	648	761
Total connections	kW	1600	1608	1823
Load factor	Per cent	25.3	17.6	19.1
Financial
Revenue from sales of current	£	–	£6,134	£20,007
Surplus of revenue over expenses	£	–	£11,375	£14,376

Macclesfield power station had a maximum load of 1583 MW and supplied 692.45 MWh of electricity in 1946.#eleccomm

Operating data for the period 1954–58 was:

Macclesfield power station operating data, 1954–58
Year	Running hours	Max output capacity MW	Electricity supplied MWh	Thermal efficiency per cent
1954	136	1160	90	57.0
1955	190	3030	137	58.0
1956	254	3030	452	58.7
1957	112	2460	199	72.2
1958	251	2200	467	85.0

The combined aggregate performance of the Macclesfield Group power stations (Alderley Edge, Buxton and Macclesfield) for 1961–63 was as follows:

Macclesfield Group operations, 1961–67
Year	Load factor per cent	Electricity supplied MWh	Thermal efficiency per cent
1961	10.7	9,387	34.21
1962	17.4	15,225	34.62
1963	20.70	18,133	34.40
1967	23.2	20,316	34.02

=== Macclesfield Electricity District ===
Macclesfield was an electricity supply district, covering 148 square miles (380 km^{2}) with an estimated population of 103,700. The number of consumers and electricity sold was:

Year	1956	1957	1958
Number of consumers	36,603	38,108	39,464
Electricity sold MWh	146,118	157,479	175,575

In 1958 the number of units sold to categories of consumers was:

Type of consumer and consumption 1958
Type of consumer	No. of consumers	Electricity sold MWh
Domestic	34,488	89,757
Commercial	2,715	22,004
Combined premises	814	3,222
Industrial	390	51,816
Farms	1044	7,617
Public lighting	13	1,159
Total	39,464	175,575

There were 774 miles (1,246 km) of high voltage mains in the district comprising 465 miles (748 km) of underground mains and 308 miles (496 km) of overhead cables.

The maximum demand on the district system was 61,350 kW, and the load factor was 32.7%.

=== Closure ===
The Macclesfield group power stations were decommissioned in about 1970.

== See also ==
- Timeline of the UK electricity supply industry
- List of power stations in England
