= Alderley Edge Methodist Church =

Coordinates: 53.3008°N 2.2337°W

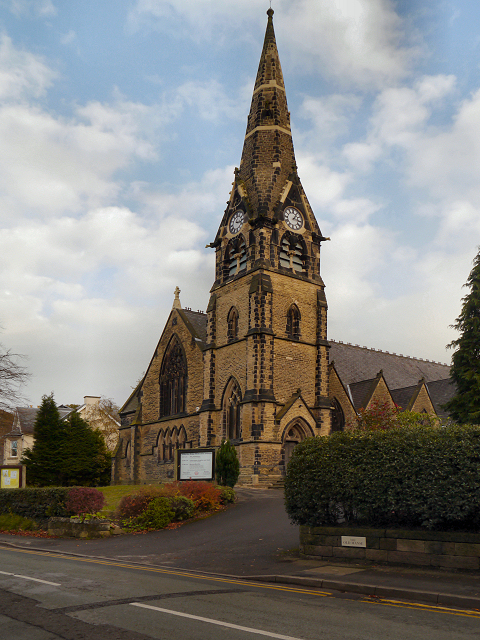
- Alderley Edge Methodist Church

- Location in Cheshire
- OS grid reference: SJ 845 782
- Location: Chapel Road, Alderley Edge, Cheshire
- Country: England
- Denomination: Methodist Church of Great Britain
- Website: Alderley Edge Methodist Church

Architecture
- Functional status: Active
- Heritage designation: Grade II
- Designated: 6 July 1984
- Architect(s): Hayley and Sons
- Architectural type: Church
- Style: Gothic Revival
- Completed: 1863

Specifications
- Materials: Sandstone, slate roofs

Administration
- District: Manchester and Stockport

Alderley Edge Methodist Church is in Chapel Road, Alderley Edge, Cheshire, England. It is an active Methodist church. The church and its associated hall are recorded in the National Heritage List for England as a designated Grade II listed building.

== History ==
The church and hall were built in 1863 to a design by Hayley and Sons. The interior of the church was re-ordered in the mid-1990s.

== Architecture ==
The buildings are constructed in sandstone with Welsh slate roofs. The plan of the church consists of a nave with two side chapels, and a southwest steeple. The hall stands behind the church. The church front facing the road is expressed as two storeys. Both storeys contain a four-light window, the upper window being sharply pointed. The tower is in three stages with an entrance porch on its side and a broach spire with lucarnes on its summit. The windows are lancets, and the bell openings have two lights with louvres. Along the sides of the church are three gabled two-light windows. The chapel contains a rose window. The tracery in the windows is in Decorated style. The windows in the church hall are simpler in design. Inside the church is a west gallery, and a pulpit and lectern, both in pitch-pine. The two-manual organ was built in 1881 by A. Young and Sons, and renovated at a later date by Charles A. Smethurst .

== See also ==
- Listed buildings in Alderley Edge
- St Philip's Church, Alderley Edge
