= The Ryleys School =

Coordinates: 53.302513°N 2.242437°W

Location
- Ryleys Lane; Alderley Edge, Cheshire, SK9 7UY; England

Information
- Type: Preparatory day
- Motto: Tu Ne Cede Malis (Latin for "Do not give in to evil")
- Established: 1877
- Department for Education URN: 111468 Tables
- Headteacher: Giles Puckle
- Gender: Coeducational
- Age: 1 to 11
- Houses: Elstob; Hoyle; Waterhouse; Wilson
- Colours: Black and gold
- Former pupils: Old Ryleysians
- Website: www.theryleys.com

The Ryleys School in Alderley Edge, Cheshire is a preparatory school for boys and girls between the ages of 1 and 11.

== History ==
Ryleys was founded in 1877, above Alderley Edge's chemist's shop (pharmacy), before moving to its current site and changing its name in the early 1880s. It was an all-boys school for 132 years until 2009, when it began accepting girls for the nursery and junior classes.

Until 2006, the school provided boarding facilities as well as taking in day pupils. It has a war memorial.

== Inspection ==
As of 2025, the school's most recent inspection by the Independent Schools Inspectorate was in 2024. The inspection found that standards relating to education, training and recreation; social and economic education and contributions to society; and safeguarding were met, but that those relating to leadership, management and governance; and health and emotional wellbeing were not met.
