= Chorley Old Hall =

Moated manor house in Cheshire, England

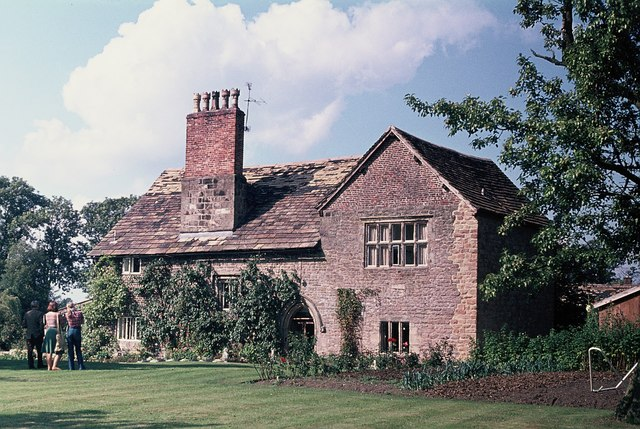
- Chorley Old Hall, south range

- Location in Cheshire
- 53.2999°N 2.2452°W
- OS grid reference: SJ 837 781

History
- Built: c. 1330
- Built for: Robert de Chorley

Listed Building – Grade I
- Official name: Chorley Old Hall
- Designated: 10 September 1959
- Reference no.: 1234539

Chorley Old Hall is a moated manor house on the B5359 road to the southwest of Alderley Edge, Cheshire, England. The house is recorded in the National Heritage List for England as a designated Grade I listed building, and the moated site is a scheduled monument. It is the oldest inhabited country house in Cheshire and consists of two ranges, one medieval (built around 1330) and the other Elizabethan (built in the mid-16th century).

== History ==
The original part of the house was built around 1330 by Robert de Chorley. By 1523 the house was owned by the Davenport family and during the middle of the 16th century they constructed a half-timbered house adjoining the existing building's north-western corner. In the early 17th century the house was owned by the Stanley family who carried out alterations around 1640 and built a bridge across the moat. The two houses were joined by a brick link in the late 18th or the early 19th century. In 1915 the house was fully restored and further renovations were carried out in 1975.

== Architecture ==
The house is L-shaped with a south and west ranges. The south range is the oldest part, which is built in buff sandstone rubble with some later ashlar and brick. It has a Kerridge stone-slate roof and a stone chimney. The range is in two storeys and has three bays, each with a gable. In the upper storey of each bay is a five-light window, in the lower storey of the left bay is a four-light window and in the lower storey of the right bay is a six-light window. All these windows are stone and are mullioned and transomed. In the middle bay is an arched doorway. The timberwork in each gable is different; in the left bay it is heavy with close studding and a middle rail, in the middle bay the timberwork is light, and in the right bay it is herringbone. The west range is timber-framed on a stone plinth with a Kerridge stone-slate roof, a stone ridge and a massive lateral stone chimney. It has two storeys and two bays with a central gable. In the left bay is a five-light window in each storey and the right bay has a four-light window in the upper storey with a door in the lower storey. All these windows are wooden, mullioned and transomed. The timber decoration consists of chevrons on the ground floor, and roundels and cross motifs above.

== External features ==
The house is surrounded by a moat which widens at the northeast corner where there are two ornamental islands. South of the moat are fishponds. The bridge over the moat, and the gate piers and wing walls to the bridge are both listed Grade II.

== See also ==
- Grade I listed buildings in Cheshire East
- Listed buildings in Alderley Edge
